= Frederick Mullett Evans =

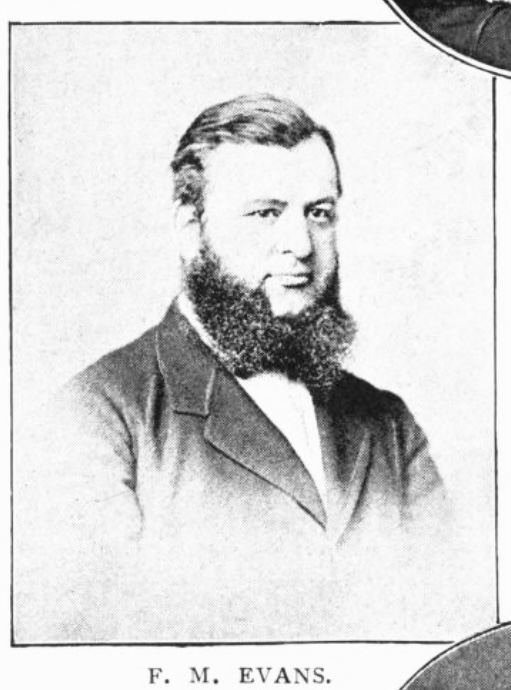
- Born: 1803
- Died: 24 June 1870 (aged 66–67)
- Occupations: Printer, publisher
- Spouse: Maria Moule
- Children: 12

Frederick Mullett Evans (1803 – 24 June 1870) was an English printer and publisher. He is known for his work as a partner from 1830 in Bradbury & Evans, who printed the works of a number of major novelists, as well as leading periodicals.

== Life ==
He was the second son of Joseph Jeffries Evans and his wife Mary Anne Mullett, daughter of Thomas Mullett; his elder brother Thomas Mullett Evans was an early associate of Benjamin Disraeli. A business partnership as printer in Southampton with Francis Joyce was dissolved in 1829.

With William Bradbury he founded Bradbury & Evans, who, for a decade from 1830, were solely London printers, in Bouverie Street and then Lombard Street. They had a modern press, powered by steam, and specialised in legal printing. They took on Chambers's Edinburgh Journal and other work for the Chambers brothers.

The firm acquired Punch magazine in 1842; its editor Mark Lemon was to become a close friend of Evans, who sustained the social side of Punch, Bradbury being more comfortable with printing. Evans was responsible for proofs and payments. The communal weekly dinner for Punch staff was also his domain. The magazine thrived on its paternalism as well as a willingness to pay salaries, and give credit.

During the 1840s, Evans lived at 7 Church Row, Stoke Newington, where both W. M. Thackeray and Charles Dickens visited. It had earlier belonged to Benjamin D'Israeli, grandfather of the Prime Minister. Thackeray commented in 1855 on his period with Punch, that the arrangements were always with Evans rather than Lemon. The Daily News launch of 1846, with Dickens as editor, proved however a costly failure that Evans regretted for decades. An arrangement of the 1840s with William Somerville Orr was dissolved in that year.

In the 1850s, Bradbury & Evans published Household Words, the weekly edited by Charles Dickens. But a disagreement came to a head in 1858/9, when Punch would not run an announcement that Dickens was separating from his wife. Two new publications resulted, All the Year Round run by Dickens in competition with Once a Week, which was edited successfully by Samuel Lucas. Also involved in the contractual basis of Household Words were John Forster and William Henry Wills. The quarrel had a personal impact on Evans, whose daughter married Dickens's eldest son, with Dickens refusing to attend the wedding and reception.

A trustee of the estate of Edward Moxon (died 1858), who published Tennyson and Swinburne, Evans pursued John Camden Hotten who was pirating Tennyson's works. Evans and Bradbury retired from running the firm in 1865, with their sons taking over: William Hardwick Bradbury and Frederick Moule Evans. The arrangement broke down in 1872, with Frederick Moule Evans being forced out, and the company became Bradbury, Agnew & Co.

Evans died on 24 June 1870 at 18 Albert Road, Regent's Park, London, his son's house.

== Family ==
Evans married Maria Moule (died 1850), youngest daughter of George Moule of Melksham, on 21 October 1830. His sister, Mary Mullett Evans, second daughter of Joseph Jeffries Evans, had married Henry Moule, brother of Maria, on 1 July 1824; Henry was the sixth son of George Moule.

Frederick and Maria had 12 children, eight of whom survived to become adults. They included:

- Frederick Moule (1833–1902), the eldest son, who married Amy Lloyd, daughter of Richard Lloyd of Henley, in 1859.
- Margaret Moule, the eldest daughter, who married the barrister Robert Orridge (died 1866) in 1860.
- Elisabeth Matilda Moule (Bessie), who married Charles Dickens, Jr. in November 1861, against his father's wishes.
- Horace (born 1841), who became a general and was knighted, and married in 1866 Elizabeth Annie Tresidder, daughter of John Nicholas Tresidder.

There were also Tom, Lewis, Godfrey and a further daughter.

Frederick was nicknamed "Pater", is described as "jovial, Pickwickian", and was taken by contemporaries as the typical Victorian paterfamilias.
