= William Hardwick Bradbury =

English publisher and printer (1832–1892)

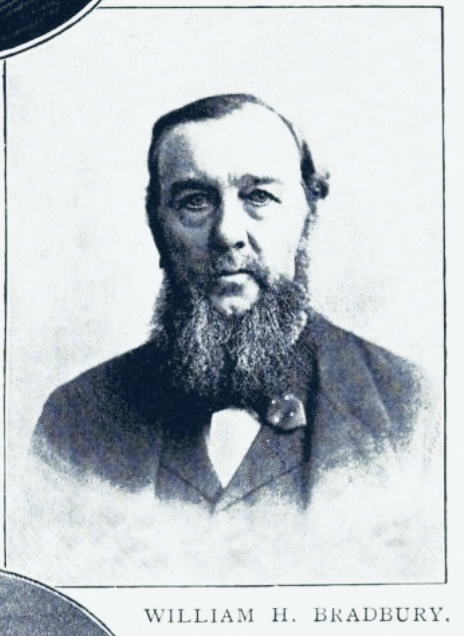
- Bradbury in 1870
- Born: December 1823
- Died: 13 October 1892 (aged 68)
- Occupations: Printer, publisher
- Spouse: Laura Agnew (m. 1860)

William Hardwick Bradbury (December 1832 – 13 October 1892) was a printer and publisher and a partner in the firm Bradbury, Evans & Co.

== Early life ==
W. H. Bradbury was one of five children and the second son of Sarah née Price (c1803-1896) and William Bradbury (1799–1869), the co-founder of the printing and publishing firm of Bradbury and Evans. When W. H. Bradbury's older sister Letitia Jane died in 1839 aged 11 Dickens wrote to his father William Bradbury offering his 'earnest and sincere sympathy and warm regard', saying that he knew what Bradbury was going through as he himself had lost 'a young and lovely creature' in the person of his sister-in-law Mary Hogarth, almost two years before.

University College School, Frognal, Hampstead in the early twentieth century

W. H. Bradbury attended a private school in Brighton before going to the University College School in Gower Street, London (1843–1848). His original intention was to study for the Bar, but printing was in his blood and instead he spent a two-year 'apprenticeship' working in publishing and bookselling in Dublin before joining the family firm of Bradbury and Evans, then in Bouverie Street in London. It is claimed that Bradbury and his older brother Henry Riley Bradbury (1829–1860) joined Frederick Moule Evans, son of their father's business partner Frederick Mullett Evans, in printing the serialisation of Charles Dickens's novel David Copperfield, published in twenty parts between May 1849 and November 1850.

== Printer and publisher ==
Bradbury and Evans published the works of Charles Dickens from 1844 until 1859, when they refused to carry an advertisement by Dickens in Punch explaining why he had separated from his wife, Catherine Dickens. Furious at their refusal, Dickens immediately cut all business and personal connections with them, returning to his old publisher, Chapman and Hall. While his father William Bradbury, on behalf of his firm Bradbury and Evans, was involved in a complicated legal dispute with Dickens, W. H. Bradbury's older brother, the writer Henry Bradbury, committed suicide by drinking acid, possibly on being refused in marriage by a daughter of Frederick Mullett Evans, his father's partner, or perhaps as a result of being accused of plagiarism by the botanical illustrator Alois Auer.

After the death of his brother, W. H. Bradbury moved from the publishing side of Bradbury and Evans to take control of the firm's large and demanding printing business. This was a difficult time for the firm as Dickens had cut all ties with them, thus losing them a considerable income. During the 1860s a number of Bradbury and Evans's periodicals, including The Gardeners' Chronicle and Once a Week were sold off. William Bradbury and Frederick Mullett Evans, the firm's founders, felt the time was right to retire, and they passed control of the business to their sons, W. H. Bradbury and Frederick Moule Evans (1883–1902).

== Later years ==
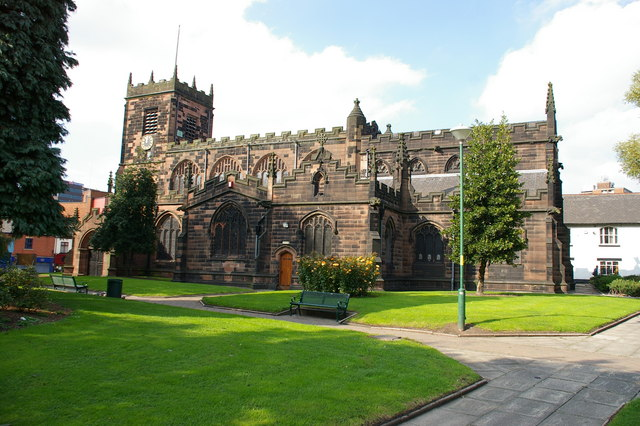
Bradbury married at the Church of St Mary the Virgin, Eccles in December 1860

On 6 December 1860 at the parish church of St Mary the Virgin in Eccles, just weeks after the death of his brother, W. H. Bradbury married Laura Agnew, the sister of the art dealer Sir William Agnew (1825–1910). The couple had three daughters, Lilian (1867–), Mabel and Alice Hope Bradbury (1870–), and a son, William Laurence Bradbury (1862–1953). When his business partner Frederick Moule Evans left the firm in 1872, it received the much-needed financial backing of Sir William Agnew and his brother Thomas. The firm then became known as Bradbury, Evans & Co. His sister Edith Bradbury also married into the Agnew family, marrying Charles Swain Agnew (1836–1915), the son of Thomas Agnew (1827–1883), in 1864.

W. H. Bradbury became Chairman of the newly-named firm, and while he decided to keep publishing the profitable Punch magazine, he decided to stop publishing books and other periodicals. Until 1885 he continued the tradition of holding an annual dinner each September to celebrate the publication of Punch's Almanack.

William Hardwick Bradbury died at his home, Oak Lodge, Nightingale Lane in Clapham, Surrey, on 13 October 1892. He was buried in West Norwood Cemetery. His estate was proved on 9 December at £33,034 05. 6d. His son William Laurence Bradbury became joint managing director of Bradbury, Evans & Co. with Sir William Agnew.
