= Mullett =

Mullett can refer to:

== People ==
=== Surname ===
==== Sports ====
- Aaron Mullett (born 1992), Australian rules footballer
- Dave Mullett (born 1965), English speedway rider
- David Mullett (born 1958), Australian cricketer
- Georgia Mullett (born 2005), English association footballer
- Joe Mullett (1936–1995), English footballer
- Leonard Mullett (1894–1944), Australian cricketer
- Rob Mullett (born 1987), British steeplechase runner

==== Other ====
- Albert Mullett (1933–2014), Aboriginal elder in Victoria, Australia
- Alfred B. Mullett (1834–1890), British-American architect
- Donald Mullett (1929–2013), American educator
- Dunken Francis Mullett (born 1964), English musician, author and martial artist
- James Mullett Jr. (1784—1858), American lawyer, judge, and politician
- James Richard Mullett (born 1976), Welsh pop singer and songwriter, known professionally as James Fox
- John Mullett (1786–1862), American surveyor
- Margaret Mullett (born 1946), British historian
- Michael Mullett (1943–2026), British historian
- Thomas Mullett (1745–1814), English businessman

=== Middle name ===
- Frederick Mullett Evans (1803–1870), English printer and publisher
- Elinor Mullett Husselman (1900–1996), American Coptic scholar and papyrologist

== Places ==
- Mullett Creek, a rural locality in Queensland, Australia
- Mullett Township, Michigan, in Cheboygan County, Michigan, U.S.

== Ships ==
- HMS Mullett, several ships of the Royal Navy
- Mullett (1813 ship), an American vessel taken as a prize of war

== Other uses ==
All in the United States, unless noted otherwise

- Mullett Arena, a multi-purpose arena in Tempe, Arizona
- Mullett Lake, in Cheboygan County, Michigan
- Mullett River (or Mullet River), in eastern Wisconsin
- Mullett Rowhouses, historic buildings in Washington, D.C.

== See also ==
- Mullet (disambiguation)
