= Mullet =

Mullet, mullets, The Mullet or The Mullets may refer to:

== Fish ==
- Mullet (fish), or "grey mullet", of the family Mugilidae
  - Flathead grey mullet, or striped mullet, Mugil cephalus, a food fish species in the family Mugilidae
- Goatfish, or "red mullet", of the family Mullidae; in particular, red mullet of the genus Mullus
- Malagasy mountain mullet, Acentrogobius therezieni, a species of fish in the family Gobiidae endemic to Madagascar
- Pearl mullet, Chalcalburnus tarichi, a species of ray-finned fish in the family Cyprinidae native to Turkey
- Shorthead redhorse, Moxostoma macrolepidotum, a freshwater fish of North America, also known as common mullet, mullet, redhorse mullet

== Hairstyle ==
- Mullet (haircut), a hairstyle that is short in the front, top, and sides, but long in the back

== Media ==
- Mullet (film), a 2001 Australian film
- The Mullets, a UPN TV sitcom
- Mullets (comic strip), a short-lived comic strip

== Places ==
- Mullet, Albania, a village in Tirana District, Albania
- Mullet Creek, a stream in the Falkland Islands
- Mullet Peninsula, aka "The Mullet", in the barony of Erris, County Mayo, Ireland
- Mullet River, a river in Wisconsin

== Other ==
- Land Mullet, Egernia major, one of the largest members of the skink family (Scincidae) native to Australia
- Mullet (heraldry), a type of star in heraldry
- Mullet, a person born in Arundel, Sussex, England, due to the presence of mullet fish in the local river
- Mullet Festival, annual event held in Niceville, Florida
- Norman Mullet, the chief superintendent in the British television show A Touch of Frost

== See also ==
- American Mullet, a 2001 documentary film directed by Jennifer Arnold
- Mullet Key, a historic island near Crystal River, Florida
- Mullet Fever, the fifth album by Canadian grindcore band Fuck the Facts (2001)
- Mormons vs. Mullets, 2020 BYU vs. Coastal Carolina football game
- Mullett (disambiguation)
- Mulet, a surname
