= Tresidder =

Tresidder is a surname. Notable people with the surname include:

- Donald Tresidder (1894–1948), American academic administrator
- Ernest Tresidder (1875–1951), Australian politician
- John Nicholas Tresidder (1819–1889), British physician and photographer
- John Tresidder Sheppard (1881–1968), English classicist

== See also ==
- Tresidder Peak
