= The Ferns of Great Britain and Ireland =

1855 book by Thomas Moore

- Author: Thomas Moore
- Language: English
- Publication date: 1855

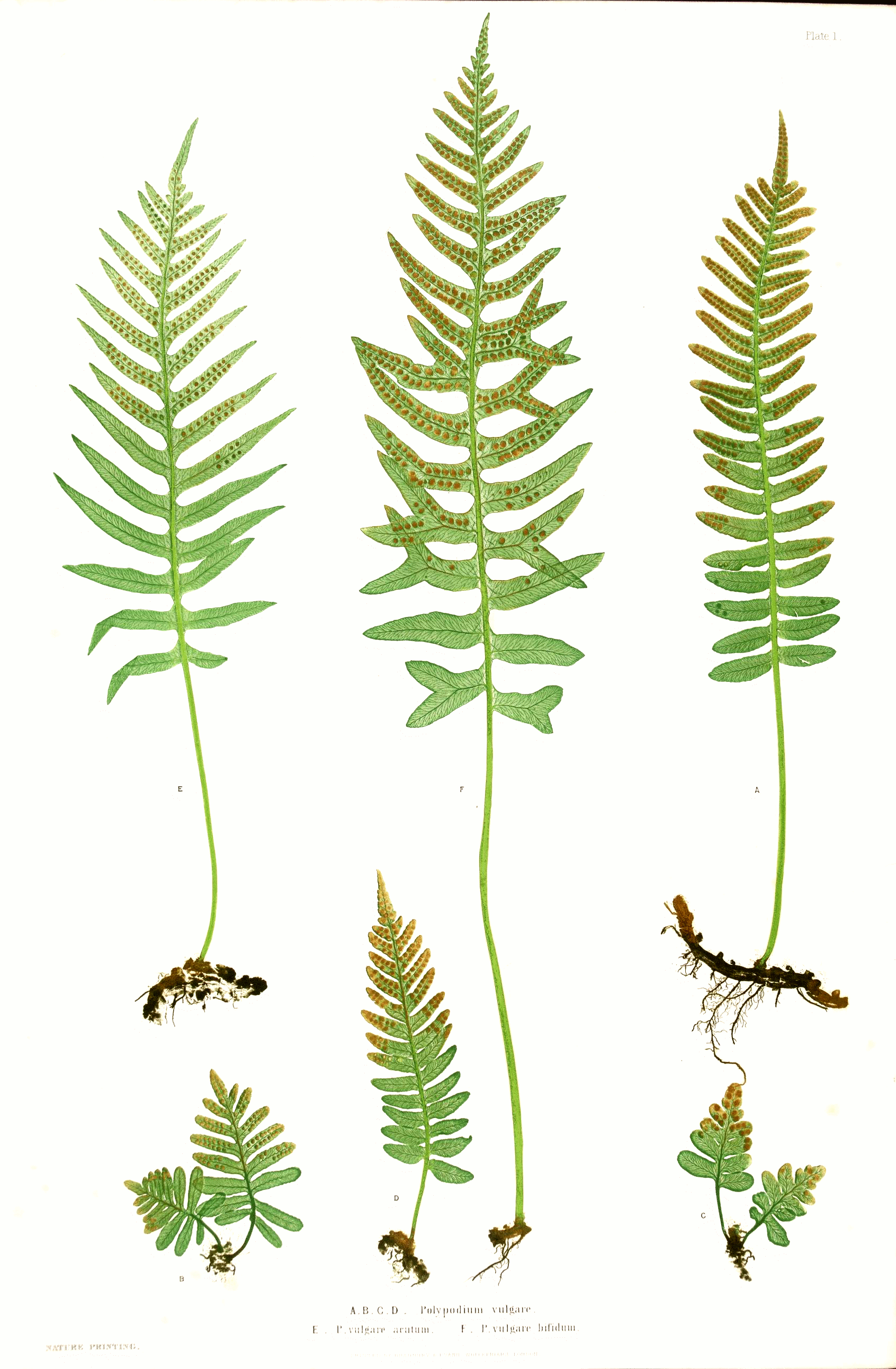
Plate 1 of the title Polypodium vulgare

The Ferns of Great Britain and Ireland was a book written by the botanist Thomas Moore, published in 1855 and edited by John Lindley. It featured 51 plates of nature printing by Henry Bradbury.

== Description ==
The text was a scientific description of all the varieties of ferns found in the British Isles. The author of this work was the botanist Thomas Moore, the editor was John Lindley.

The book was released at a time of so-called "pteridomania" in Britain. Along with William Grosart Johnstone and Alexander Croall's Nature-Printed British Sea-Weeds (London, 1859–1860), the book featured Bradbury's innovative nature printing process. The publisher of the work was Bradbury and Evans. Bradbury patented the process after seeing the invention of Alois Auer - though the identity of its inventor grew to be a subject of debate.

The technique was briefly in vogue, but did not persist in printing. Bradbury, along with Auer, believed the technique to be an enormous advance in printing. However, the plants and other subjects that could be successfully printed in this way were few. Ferns were one of the few plants with a form that could be replicated, the shape of the fronds being largely two-dimensional.

In this work the ferns, a plant highly suited to the process, were impressed upon soft lead plates. These were electroplated to become the printing plate, the details of the fronds and stem were hand-coloured at this stage. The resulting image was in two colours and provided a highly detailed and realistic depiction of the species.

== See also ==
- Pteridomania

== See also ==
- List of Irish botanical illustrators
- List of Irish plant collectors
