= Charlotte Adams =

Charlotte Adams may refer to:

- Charlotte Adams (mountain climber) (1860-1920)
- Charlotte Adams (writer) (1793 – 1873)
- Charlotte Adams (Home and Away), fictional character from the Australian Seven Network soap opera Home and Away
