= James Mullett =

James Mullett may refer to:

- James Mullett Jr. (1784–1858), American lawyer, judge, and politician
- James Richard Mullett (born 1976), Welsh pop singer and songwriter, known professionally as James Fox

== See also ==
- Mullett (disambiguation)
