= The Notting Hill Mystery =

1865 English detective novel

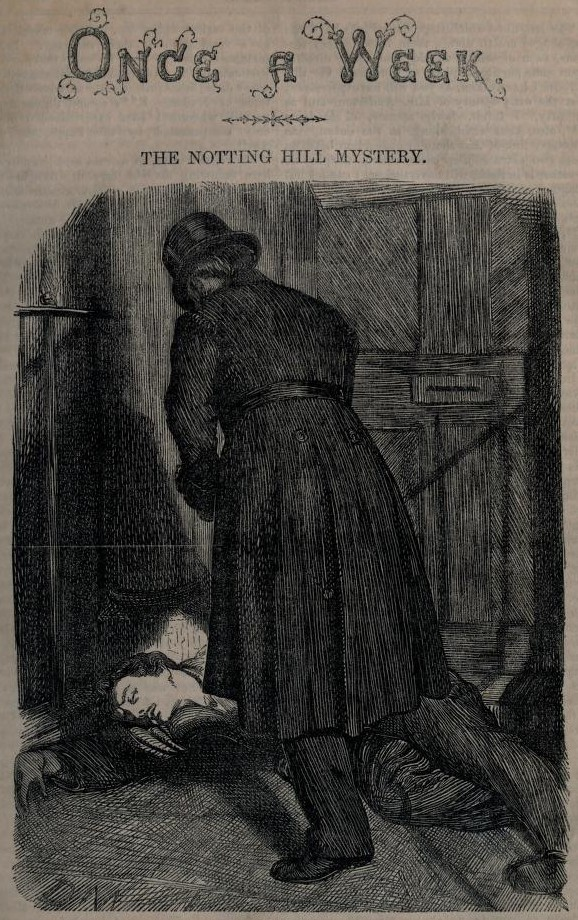
- Cover art for Section V of The Notting Hill Mystery, Once A Week, 27 December 1862
- Author: Charles Felix (pseudonym of Charles Warren Adams )
- Illustrator: George du Maurier
- Language: English
- Genre: Detective novel
- Publisher: Bradbury & Evans (serial); Saunders, Otley, and Company (book)
- Publication date: 1862–63 (serial); 1865 (book)
- Publication place: United Kingdom
- Media type: Print (magazine and hardcover)

The Notting Hill Mystery is an English-language detective novel written and serialised under the pseudonym Charles Felix from 1862 to 1863 and published in book form in 1865, with illustrations by George du Maurier. The author's identity was never revealed, but several critics have suggested posthumously Charles Warren Adams (1833–1903), a lawyer known to have written other novels under pseudonyms. It is seen as one of the first detective novels in the English language, if not the first.

== History ==
The Notting Hill Mystery first appeared as an eight-part serial in Once A Week magazine beginning on 29 November 1862, then as a single-volume novel in 1865 published by Saunders, Otley, and Company, with illustrations by George du Maurier (grandfather of Daphne du Maurier).

The magazine editors stated that the manuscript was submitted to them under the pseudonym "Charles Felix". In 1952, William Buckler identified Charles Warren Adams (1833–1903) as the author of The Notting Hill Mystery and in January 2011, Paul Collins, a writer, editor and academic, writing in The New York Times Book Review, came to the same conclusion. Adams, a lawyer, was the sole proprietor of Saunders, Otley & Co., which published another book by "Charles Felix" called Velvet Lawn, and an edition of The Notting Hill Mystery in 1865. Collins bases his theory on several lines of evidence, including a reference to Felix's identity as Adams in a 14 May 1864 "Literary Gossip" column of The Manchester Times: "It is understood that Velvet Lawn, by Charles Felix, the new novel announced by Messrs. Saunders, Otley & Co., is by Mr. Charles Warren Adams, now the sole representative of that firm."

Some critics – including Julian Symons, a crime writer and poet – believe it to be the first modern detective novel, though it was later overshadowed by works by Wilkie Collins and Émile Gaboriau, which usually receive that accolade. Some aspects of detective fiction can also be found in R. D. Blackmore's sensation novel Clara Vaughan (written in 1853, published in 1864), about the daughter of a murder victim seeking her father's killer, but Adams's novel contains several innovations, such as the main character presenting evidence of his own findings through diary entries, family letters, depositions, chemical analysts report and crime scene map. These techniques would not become common until the 1920s. Symons said it "quite bowled me over" how far ahead of its time it was.

== Plot ==
Source documents compiled by insurance investigator Ralph Henderson are used to build a case against Baron "R___", who is suspected of murdering his wife. The baron's wife died from drinking a bottle of acid, apparently while sleepwalking in her husband's private laboratory. Henderson's suspicions are raised when he learns that the baron recently had purchased five life insurance policies for his wife. As Henderson investigates the case, he discovers not one but three murders. The plot hinges on the dangers of mesmerism, a subject explored in fiction earlier by Isabella Frances Romer. Although the baron's guilt is clear to the reader even from the outset, how he did it remains a mystery. Eventually this is revealed, but how to catch him becomes the final challenge; he seems to have committed the perfect crime.

== Editions ==
The novel was reprinted in 1945 in the anthology Novels of Mystery from the Victorian Age, edited by Maurice Richardson. In March 2011 the British Library made the novel available via print-on-demand. It sold so many copies that the British Library produced a trade edition, using photographs of the 1865 edition. This was published in 2012, marking the 150th anniversary of the first publication of the novel.

== See also ==
- 1862 in literature
- 1863 in literature
