= Charles Warren Adams =

English lawyer, author and anti-vivisectionist

Charles Warren Adams (1833–1903) was an English lawyer, publisher and anti-vivisectionist, now known from documentary evidence to have been the author of The Notting Hill Mystery. This is often taken to be the first full-length detective novel in English.

== Novels ==
As a lawyer Adams became involved in bailing out the once famous London publishing firm of Saunders, Otley & Co. after the two proprietors had died. The effort was unsuccessful and liquidation ensued in 1869, but in the meantime the firm had published at least two works of Adams's own, written under the pseudonym Charles Felix. One was a crime novel entitled Velvet Lawn (1864), and the other The Notting Hill Mystery (1865 in book form), which is thought to have been the first detective story of novel length.

The Notting Hill Mystery had already appeared as a serial in Once A Week in 1862–1863, illustrated by George du Maurier (1834–1896), author of Trilby. The du Maurier illustrations also feature in the recent first Italian translation of the book and the first German translation of the book, by Boris Greff and Matthias Marx, which was published in 2014.

== Life and libels ==
Adams was the son of serjeant-at-law John Adams and writer Charlotte Adams.

Adams first married in 1861 Georgina Alethe Polson (b. 1838), daughter of the Rev. Hugh Polson and Georgiana, only child of Charlotte Yonge and her first husband Captain George Crawley. His wife died in 1880. Adams was the secretary of the Anti-Vivisection Society, on whose committee was Mildred Coleridge, great-grand niece of the poet Samuel Taylor Coleridge, and daughter of John Coleridge, 1st Baron Coleridge (1820–1894), who became Solicitor General in 1868, Attorney-General in 1871, Chief Justice of the Common Pleas in 1873, and Lord Chief Justice in 1880. When she left home to live with Adams, there was consternation in her family. Her brother Bernard Coleridge wrote her a long letter attacking Adams. This led to acrimonious libel actions in 1884 and 1886, which Adams won. The couple were married on 24 June 1885. They remained together until Adams's death in July 1903. His widow died in January 1929.
