= Henry Bradbury =

British artist

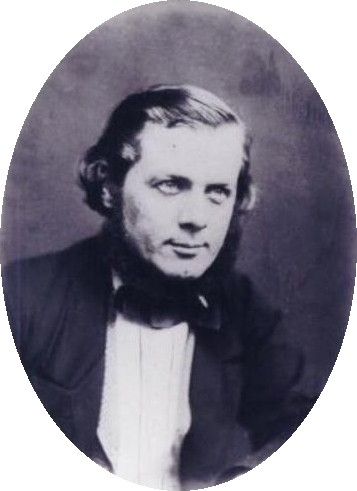
- Born: 20 September 1829; Wingrove Place, Clerkenwell, England
- Died: 2 September 1860 (aged 30)
- Occupation: Writer
- Parent(s): William Bradbury; Sarah Price

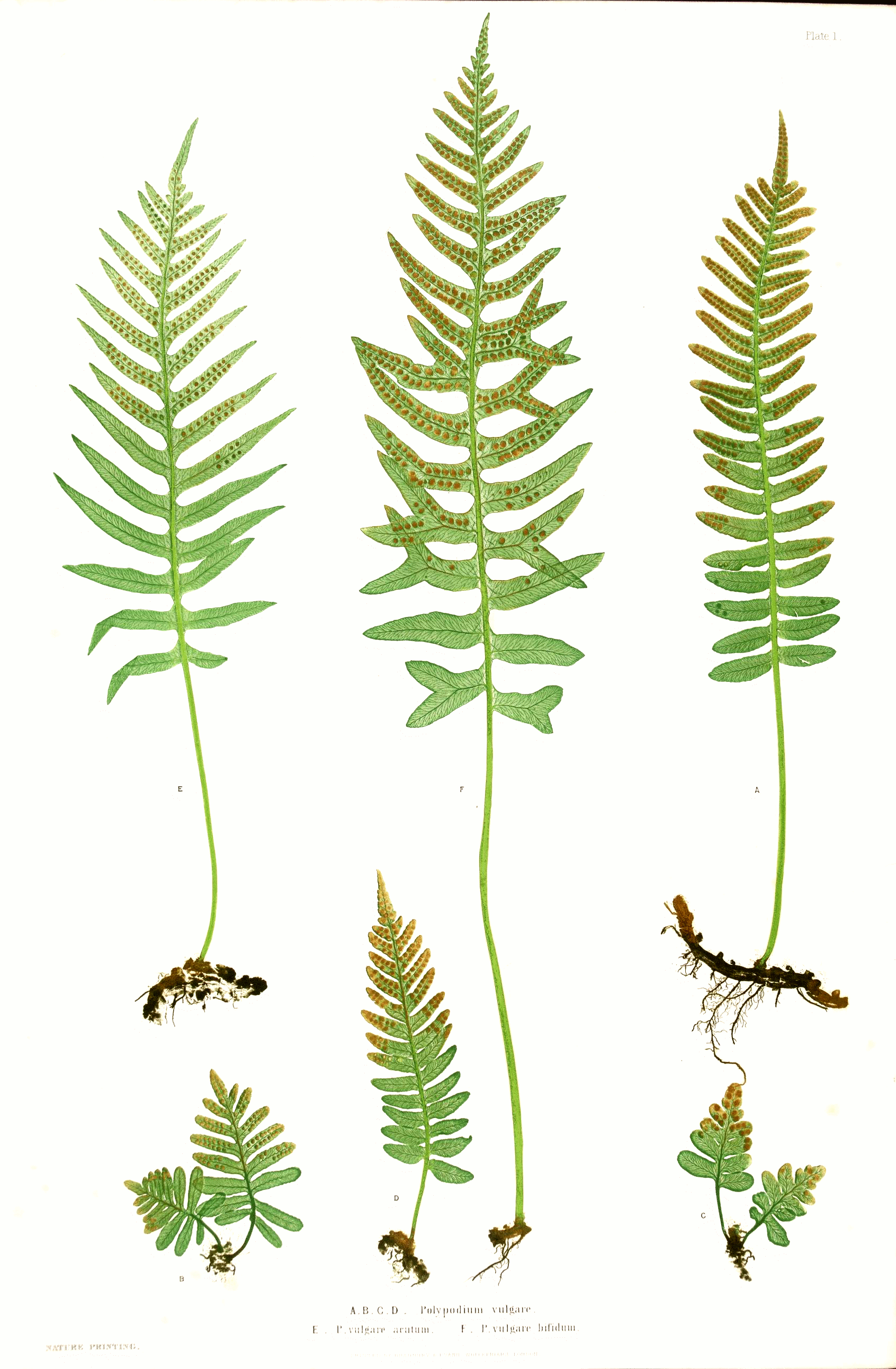
Polypodium vulgare Moore The Ferns of Great Britain and Ireland

Henry Riley Bradbury (20 September 1829 – 2 September 1860) was an English writer on printing.

== Works ==
Bradbury is known for his book The Ferns of Great Britain and Ireland with author Thomas Moore and editor John Lindley published in 1855. It used the innovative technique of nature printing invented by Alois Auer and Andreas Worring in 1852 and improved by Bradbury. The technique consisted of pressing a leafy specimen onto a thin, soft lead plate, leaving an intaglio impression with very fine detail.

== Life ==
He was the oldest son of five children of a printer, William Bradbury (1799–1869) and his wife, Sarah, and brother of William Hardwick Bradbury with whom he went into business in publishing. From 1856 he took an interest in the security aspects of banknote printing, and set up the business Bradbury & Wilkinson. Bradbury had studied Auer's discovery in Vienna and had patented his own version in London. After being accused of plagiarism by Auer, Bradbury took his own life by drinking acid.
