= Gyotaku =

Japanese marine printmaking tradition

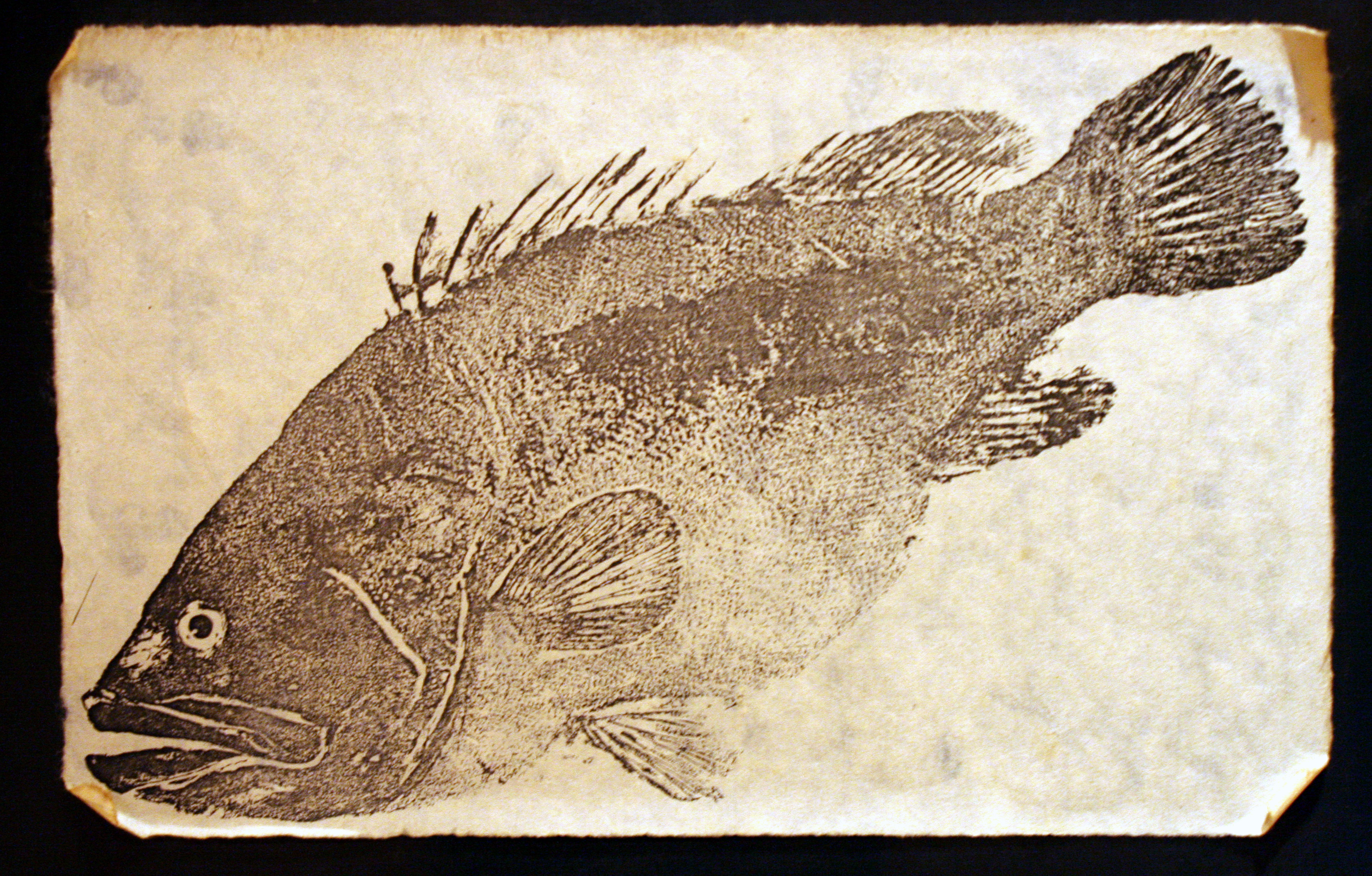
Gyotaku print of a fish

Gyotaku (魚拓; from gyo 'fish' + taku 'stone impression', fish print(ing)) is the traditional Japanese method of printing fish, a practice which dates back to the mid-1800s. This form of nature printing, where ink is applied to a fish which is then pressed onto paper, was used by fishermen to record their catches, but has also become an art form of its own.

The gyotaku method of printmaking uses fish, sea creatures, or similar subjects as its "printing plates". Prints are made using sumi ink and washi paper. It is rumored that samurai would settle fishing competitions using gyotaku prints. This original form of gyotaku, as a recording method for fishermen, is still utilized today, and can be seen hanging in tackle shops in Japan.

== Methods ==
Gyotaku eventually evolved into an art form with three different approaches:

- The direct method (直接法, chokusetsu-hō) is the closest to the original method. The fish is cleaned, prepped, supported, and then inked. At this point, dampened washi ('mulberry paper') is applied to the fish, and an image is created by careful hand rubbing or pressing.
- The indirect method (間接法, kansetsu-hō) is a more painstaking process, and yields very delicate and detailed images. This method involves adhering washi paper, silk, or other fabric to the fish using rice paste. The fish offers the detail of its relief through the silk, and the ink is applied painstakingly to the silk while adhered to the fish, with tampos (applicators made of silk wrapped around cotton).
- The transfer method (転写法, tensha-hō) is lesser known and used. It was developed when the objective of the printing was to create the image on a hard surface such as wood, leather, plastic or even the wall of a dwelling. These are situations when it would be impossible to apply the foundation of the work directly to the surface of the inked subject. In tensha-hō, the subject is prepared and inked as in the direct method. The image is then lifted from the subject after placing and pressing a piece of nylon or polyethylene on the ink-covered object. The transfer film is then lifted and carefully placed and pressed upon the target surface. In this method, the final image is not reversed as it is in the direct method. Through the process, the image is reversed a second time, resulting in a right-oriented impression.

At times, direct prints are left in the black and white state they are printed in, with the eyes painted in afterwards, in grayscale. This most closely approximates the original form of gyotaku, the record of the fisherman's catch. Color is usually added to the artistic version of these creations, either by using colored inks directly on the fish, or by adding color to the piece afterwards, with transparent washes of inks or color mediums. Finished works can be mounted on scrolls, wet-mounted to canvas, or mounted to background washi paper, then matted and framed. Frequently, the work includes a red seal (chop) and/or some kanji calligraphy indicating the artist's name and information, or important subject matter.

Similarly, nature prints evolved in the western world beginning as a functional process and later becoming an art form. In the earliest nature prints, inks or pigments were applied directly to the relief surface of leaves and/or other relatively flat natural subjects in order to capture images of their sizes, shapes, surface textures, and delicate vein or scale patterns. Typically both sides of a leaf were coated with ink, and the leaf was then placed inside a folded sheet or between two sheets of paper. When rubbed by hand or run through a printing press, a mirror image was produced of the topside and underside of the same leaf. Often the prints were done in black ink, and the flowers later painted or drawn in by the artist. In other cases a flattened, dried leaf or plant was coated once with black ink and then repeatedly printed in a printing press. The initial dark print was used as a work copy or proof print. The subsequent prints, with fainter traces of ink, were hand colored to more closely resemble the appearance of the real subjects. This methodology is generally applicable to making a print from a fish. They also used wood and carved images into that.

The direct method is currently used throughout the world to record images of a wide diversity of subjects. Many fish printers utilize the direct method but apply colored inks to more closely replicate the natural colors of their subjects. Duplicate images can be created with the direct method to produce unique, one-of-a-kind prints, so can be editioned like other forms of relief printing.
