= Nona Bellairs =

British author and botanist (1824–1897)

Nona Maria Stevenson Bellairs (1828–1897) was an English author of travel guides, botanical guidebooks, and novels. She was also a philanthropist who assisted weavers in Bedworth to emigrate following the collapse of the local ribbon-weaving industry in the 1860s.

== Biography ==
Nona Maria Stevenson Bellairs was born into a large family in Bedworth, Warwickshire. Her mother was Dorothy (Mackenzie) Bellairs, the daughter of a wealthy sugar planter in the West Indies, and her father was the Rev. Henry Bellairs (1790-1872), who was at various times in his career rector of Bedworth in Warwickshire, vicar of Hunsingore in Yorkshire, and an honorary canon of Worcester Cathedral.

Bellairs wrote several travel books that doubled as botanical guidebooks, the first of which, Going Abroad (1857), was set in France and Italy. Her hybrid approach is evident in this extract from the book's table of contents: "Nice — The English Church — Asplenium Trichomanes — Mentone — A Country Carnival — Cheilanthes Odora". Her guidebook and memoir Hardy Ferns (1865) was a product of the later stages of the Victorian craze for collecting ferns. Bellairs called for protection of ferns, some of which were becoming very rare due to overcollecting, writing: "The poor Ferns, like the wolves in olden time, have a price set upon their heads, and they in like manner will soon altogether disappear. We must have 'Fern laws', and preserve them like game."

She also wrote at least two novels, the first of which, Redmarsh Rectory (1859), may have been inspired in part by her experiences as the daughter of a minister. Her second novel, Strength and Weakness (1867), was a story of factory life.

Critics generally praised her writing as refined and pleasant.

In Bedworth, where her father was rector, the ribbon-weaving industry collapsed in the 1860s. Bellairs is remembered for her great efforts assisting local jobless weavers and their families to emigrate to Australia.

== Selected books ==
- Going Abroad; Or, Glimpses of Art and Character in France and Italy (1857)
- "The Father's Hope; or, The Wanderer Returned" (short story, 1857)
- "An Old Woman's Story; or, Trust in Trial" (short story, 1859)
- Redmarsh Rectory: A Tale of Life (1859)
- Hardy Ferns: How I Collected and Cultivated Them (1865)
- Wayside Flora; Or, Gleanings from Rock & Field Towards Rome (1866)
- Strength and Weakness (1867)
