= Mulet =

Mulet is a surname. Notable people with the name include:

- Agustín Mulet, Argentine professional footballer
- Carles Mulet Garcia, Spanish politician and senator
- Edmond Mulet, Guatemalan diplomat, lawyer and notary public
- Francesc Mulet, Spanish writer
- Henri Mulet, French composer, pipe and reed organist
- Jaime Mulet, Chilean politician and lawyer
- María Mulet, Spanish writer
