= Nature printing =

Pre-photographic printing process

Nature printing is a printing process, developed in the 18th century, that uses plants, animals, rocks and other natural subjects to produce an image. The subject undergoes several stages to give a direct impression onto materials such as lead, gum, and photographic plates, which are then used in the printing process.

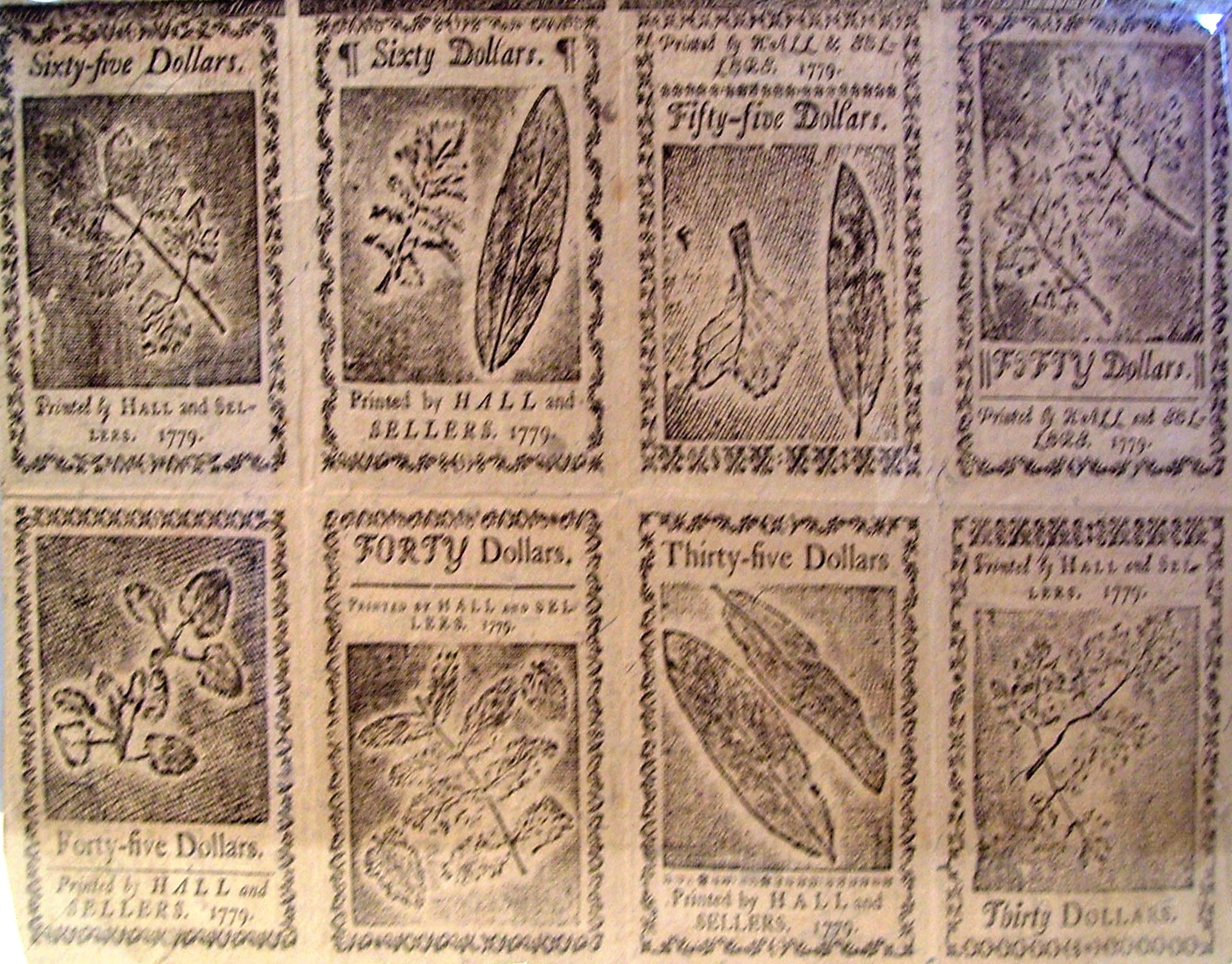
Benjamin Franklin's nature printed currency (1779)

While some sources state that Benjamin Franklin invented nature printing from leaf casts, using a copper plate press, in 1737 to thwart counterfeiters of paper money bills, other sources also report Franklin's friend, Philadelphia naturalist Joseph Breintnall, to have made contact nature prints from leaves in about 1730. Together they sent nature prints which were printed directly from inked leaves to English naturalists.

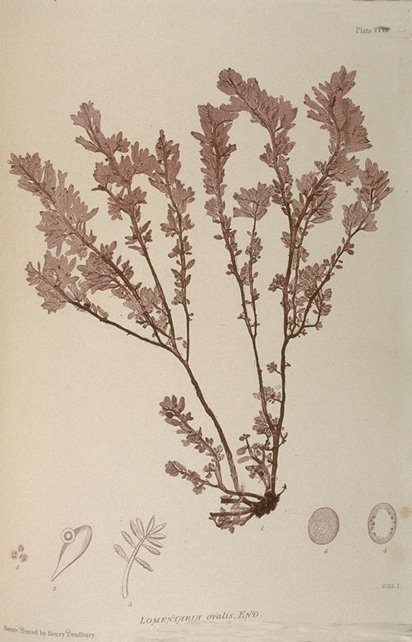
Plate from The Nature-printed British Seaweeds, (1859–60)

Another person attributed with the invention of the process, Naturselbstdruck, is Alois Auer; the first publication, of instructions for the process, was by this Austrian printer in The Discovery of the Natural Printing Process: an Invention ... Vienna, 1853. This was written in four languages by the author. He shows the use of plants, a fossil fish, and lace impressed by roller onto a lead plate, this is hand coloured and transferred to the final print.

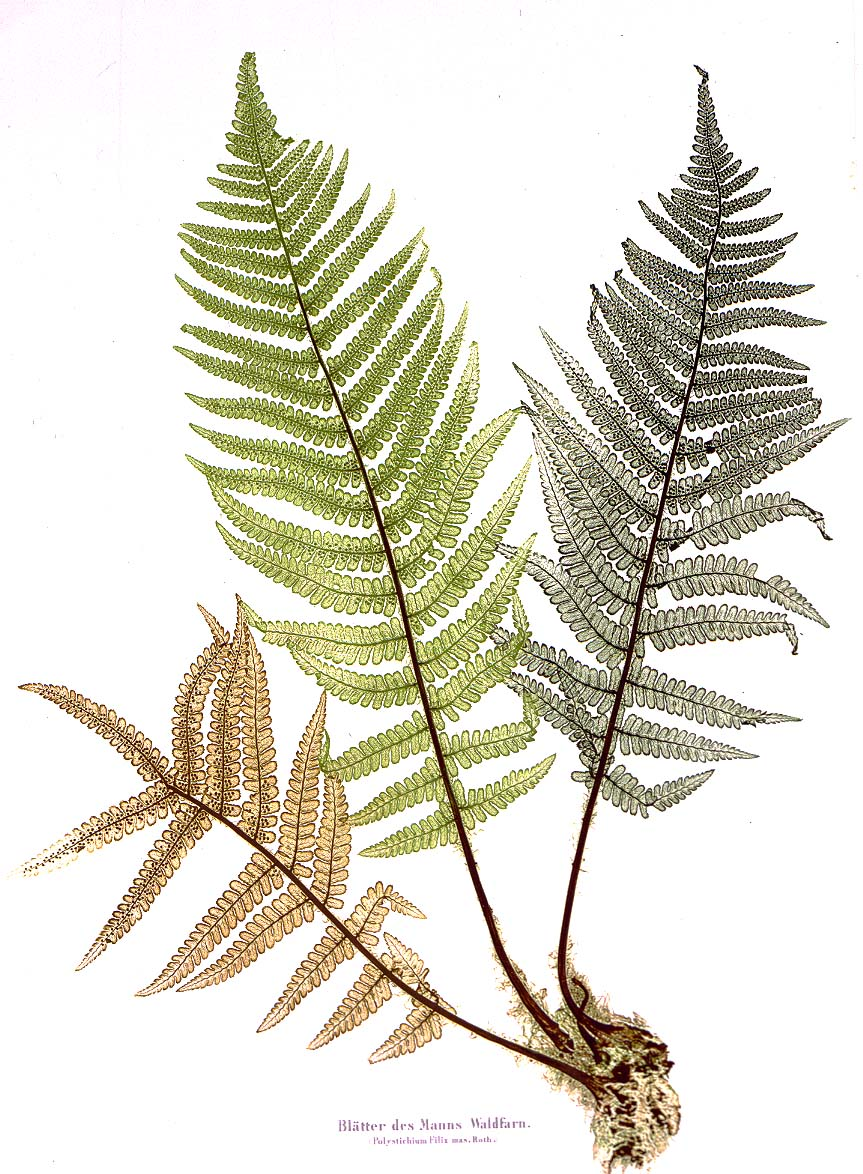

Many others botanical and natural history illustrations had attempted to use techniques that were a 'shorthand', or for a type of accuracy, in the representation of subjects. Another printer, the Englishman Henry Bradbury, immediately used Auer's 'nature printing' process to publish work of his own. These included two major botanical works;

- The Ferns of Great Britain and Ireland, Moore, Thomas. (1857) and the rendition of these species was readily adapted to the process; the two dimensional print would reveal form and detail for the identification of species.
- The Nature-Printed British Sea-Weeds, W. G. Johnstone & A. Croall. 1859–60.

Sherman Denton in his book As Nature Shows Them: Moths and Butterflies ... used the wings of the species he was describing by pressing them into the page itself. For this work he used over 50,000 insects.

== Auer method ==
Auer's method can only be used with objects with tolerably flat surfaces, such as dried and pressed plants, embroidery and lace, and a few animals. The object is placed between a plate of steel and another of lead, both of which are smooth, and polished. They are then drawn through a pair of rollers under considerable pressure. When the plates are separated, it is found that a perfect impression of the object has been made in the leaden plate. This may be used directly as an engraved plate, but only if a very few impressions are wanted, for it is too soft to resist the action of printing presses for practical purposes. For larger numbers of images, a facsimile to be used as the printing plate is made in copper by the electrotype process.

== See also ==
- Gyotaku
