= Bradbury and Evans =

English printing and publishing business

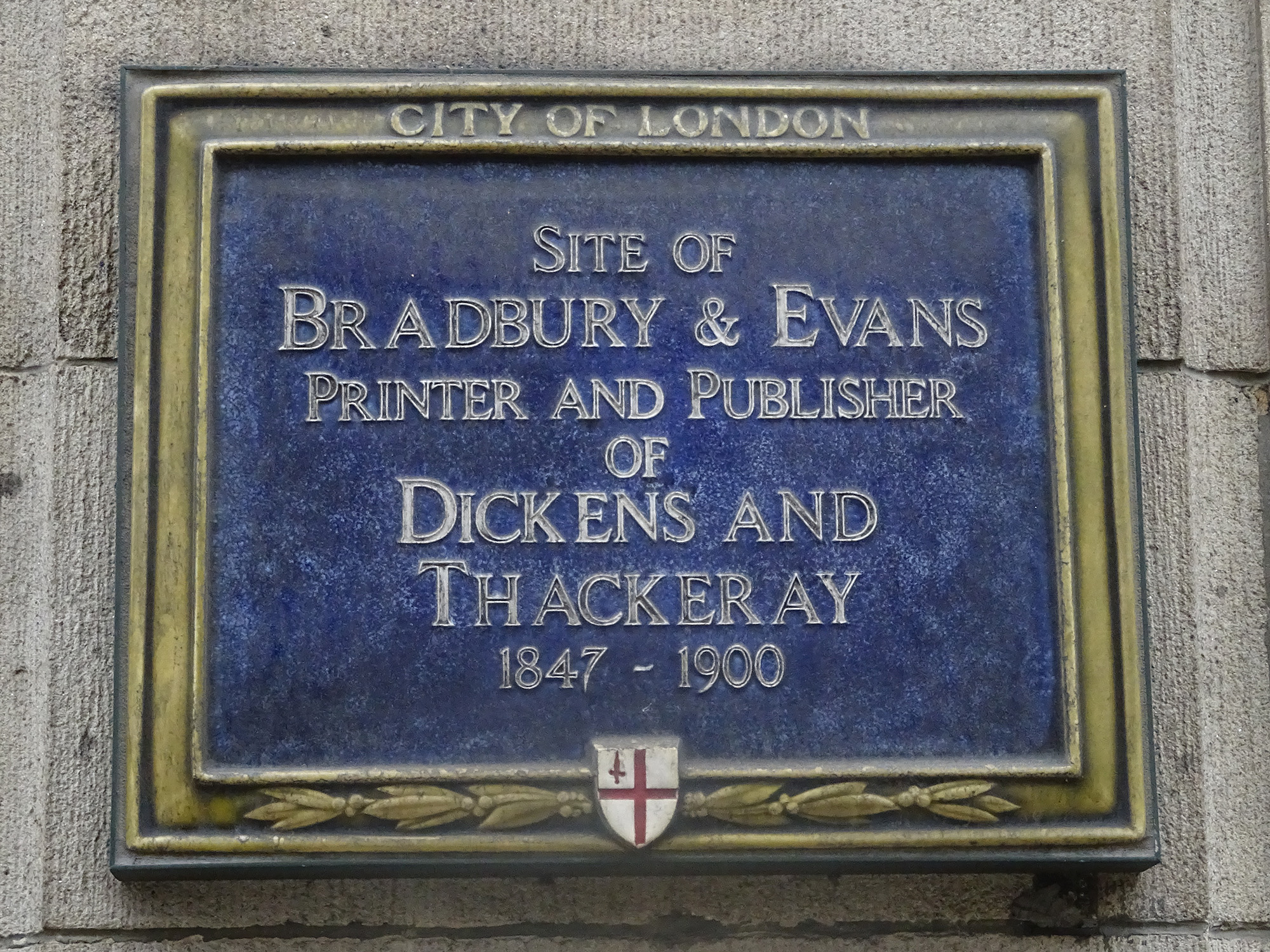
Plaque marking the Fleet Street location of Bradbury and Evans.

Bradbury & Evans (est.1830) was a printing and publishing business founded in London by William Bradbury (1799–1869) and Frederick Mullett Evans (1804–1870).

== History ==
For the first ten years Bradbury & Evans were printers, then added publishing in 1841 after they purchased Punch magazine. As printers they did work for Joseph Paxton, Edward Moxon, and Chapman and Hall (publishers of Charles Dickens). Dickens left Chapman and Hall in 1844 and Bradbury and Evans became his new publisher. Bradbury and Evans published William Makepeace Thackeray's Vanity Fair in 1847 (as a serial), as well as most of his longer fiction. The firm operated from offices at no.11 Bouverie Street, no.85 Fleet Street, and no.4-14 Lombard Street, London (now Lombard Lane).

The inclusion of a monthly supplement, Household Narrative, in the weekly Household Words edited by Dickens was the occasion for a test case on newspaper taxation in 1851. Bradbury & Evans as publishers might have found themselves in the forefront of the ongoing campaign against "taxes on knowledge"; but the initial court decision went in their favour. The government then tried amending the existing law, to duck public opinion, reversing the stand taken by the revenue on the definition of "newspaper".

After Bradbury & Evans broke with Dickens in 1859, they founded the illustrated literary magazine Once a Week, which competed with Dickens' new All The Year Round (the successor to Household Words). Among the artists who contributed illustrations to the firm's publications: John Leech and John Tenniel. In 1861 Evans' daughter, Bessie Evans, married Dickens' son, Charles Dickens, Jr. The founders' sons, William Hardwick Bradbury (1832–1892) and Frederick Moule Evans (1832–1902), continued the business, with the much needed financial backing of William Agnew and his brother Thomas.

== See also ==
- Sir William Agnew, 1st Baronet, a partner of the firm
