= Thomas Mullett =

English businessman and supporter of the American Revolution (1745–1814)

- Born: 1745
- Died: 1814 (aged 68–69)
- Occupation: Businessman
- Spouse: Mary Evans
- Parent: Jane Mullet
- Relatives: Frederick Mullett Evans (grandson)

Thomas Mullett (also Mullet; 1745–1814) was an English businessman and supporter of the American Revolution.

== Early life ==
Mullett was a Quaker from Taunton, Devon, the son of Jane Mullet; Thomas Melhuish (c. 1737–1802), a Quaker minister and shopkeeper, became his stepfather when his mother remarried. He left the Society of Friends on marrying. He moved to Bristol and there was involved with the Broadmead Baptist congregation, being secretary of the Bristol Education Society (founded 1770) that supported the local dissenting academy. He was a reformer and friend of Horatio Gates.

In Bristol, Mullett was in business as a stationer; and also by 1771 a papermaker, taking over from John Stock as the local manufacturer.

== American Revolution period ==
A friend of John Wilkes, Mullett became a leader of Bristol radicals, with Henry Cruger and Samuel Peach. In the 1774 general election, Cruger and Edmund Burke were elected as Bristol's Members of Parliament. Mullett wrote an account of the election with the Bristol list of voters published as The Bristol Poll-Book, but managed to offend Burke by identifying him too closely with Cruger. Burke was willing in 1779, however, to help Mullett release James Caton, a pro-American, from the press gang, with John Dunning applying under habeas corpus.

Jared Sparks conjectured that Mullett might have been the author of an unsigned letter from Bristol, to William Palfrey and containing intelligence, dated 16 February 1776. In British politics, Mullett favoured parliamentary reform; and he also supported the American Revolution. In 1778 he joined a Bristol committee for the relief of American prisoners. He travelled three times to America during his life. On his first American journey, just after the end of the American Revolutionary War, in 1783, he visited George Washington at Mount Vernon. He wrote to John Wilkes about his travels, from Charleston, South Carolina, on 15 February, describing how he had started from Portsmouth, New Hampshire, and the prospects of trade, with New York impressive; noting also the remaining strong feeling against some of the British military leaders from the war.

== Later 1780s ==
Cruger was the senior partner in firms including Mullett. Henry Cruger & Co. of Bristol was dissolved at the beginning of 1785.

In 1787 Mullett was advising Alexander Hamilton, at the time of the Constitutional Convention. In February 1788 he was in Bristol, recently returned from America, and called on Sarah Fox the diarist to pass on news. He kept up payments on his Broadmead pew to 1788. Cruger, Lediard & Mullett of Sise Lane, London, was dissolved on 25 March 1788. In 1789, Mullett was listed as a merchant in New York.

== French Revolution and Napoleonic War period ==
Mullett moved to London around 1790, and was in business there with Joseph Jeffries Evans, his nephew by marriage, as an agent for American trade. In 1802 Thomas Mullett & Co. were listed as merchants of 11 Broad Street Buildings. Evans died in 1812, at age 44.

Mullett was a regular correspondent of the politician Samuel Whitbread. He supplied Whitbread with figures for a major speech in parliament against the Orders in Council used to enforce the wartime blockade against the UK's enemies (as did George Joy); as well as appearing before the House of Lords on 22 February, and attending as one of the petitioners in person against them on 23 March, in 1808.

Jonathan Russell, the American diplomat, kept Mullett informed of his 1812 negotiations with the British government. When in 1822 Seth Hunt suggested that Russell had also kept Mullett briefed about the negotiations for the Treaty of Ghent, a high-profile libel case arose, lost by Hunt. Towards the end of the War of 1812, Jacob Barker tried to raise money for the US government from Mullett & Co.

== Death ==
Mullett and his company supported the Society of Friends of Foreigners In Distress. He died at Clapham on 14 November 1814. A sermon on his death was preached by John Evans at his interment at Bunhill Fields on 23 November 1814. In February 1815 the house of Mullett, Evans & Co. stopped payments, and went into receivership.

== Associations ==
Peter Van Schaack, Cruger's son-in-law, knew Mullett and had a high opinion of him. Mullett had an introduction in 1783 from Samuel Stennett, a friend, to James Manning, President of the Baptist College of Rhode Island (now Brown University). The relationship resulted in a donation of books from the Bristol Education Society to the College.

In 1783–1785, Mullett corresponded with Robert Robinson. In London, he became a close friend of Henry Crabb Robinson.

== Family ==
Mullett married Mary Evans (c. 1743 – 1800), sister of Caleb Evans the Bristol minister. She was connected to the London Baptist minister Timothy Thomas, son of Joshua Thomas, who married her half-sister Sarah. After her death, Thomas Mullett and his son-in-law became Unitarians, in the Worship Street congregation of John Evans (1767–1827).

Of the children of Thomas and Mary Mullett:

- Two sons died young, in 1771.
- Frederick (died 1834)
- Mary Anne (1777–1857)
- Sarah
- Jane married James Webbe Tobin, in 1807.

Mary Mullett Evans, second daughter of Joseph Jeffries Evans, married Henry Moule, on 1 July 1824. Frederick Mullett Evans was her brother.
