= Thomas Moore (botanist) =

British gardener and botanist

- Born: 21 May 1821; Stoke, Surrey, England
- Died: 1 January 1887 (aged 65)
- Notable work: The Ferns of Great Britain and Ireland
- Scientific career
- Fields: botany
- Author abbrev. (botany): T.Moore

Thomas Moore (21 May 1821 – 1 January 1887) was a British gardener and botanist. An expert on ferns and fern allies from the British Isles, he served as Curator of the Society of Apothecaries Garden from 1848 to 1887. In 1855, Moore authored The Ferns of Great Britain and Ireland. The standard author abbreviation T.Moore is used to indicate this person as the author when citing a botanical name.

== Life ==
He was born at Stoke, near Guildford, Surrey, on 21 May 1821. He was brought up as a gardener, and was employed at Fraser's Lee Bridge Nursery, and subsequently, under Robert Marnock, in the laying out of the Regent's Park gardens.

In 1848, by the influence of Dr. John Lindley, he was appointed curator of the Apothecaries' Company's Garden at Chelsea, in succession to Robert Fortune, an appointment which gave him leisure for other work. Under Moore's tenure during the period of so-called "pteridomania", the garden increased the number of fern species cultivated there by fifty percent and was renamed the Chelsea Physic Garden in 1875. The Thomas Moore Fernery was built in 1907 on the site of his original garden and now contains a display of the varieties of ferns described and cultivated by Moore and popular during the Victorian era.

He acted as an editor of the Gardeners' Magazine of Botany from 1850 to 1851, of the Garden Companion and Florists' Guide in 1852, of the Floral Magazine in 1860 and 1861, of the Gardeners' Chronicle from 1866 to 1882, of the Florist and Pomologist from 1868 to 1874, and of the Orchid Album from 1881 to 1887.

He made a special study of ferns, most of his independent works being devoted to that group of plants; but he also acquired a knowledge of garden plants and florists' flowers generally, which was probably greater than that of any of his contemporaries. He acted as one of the secretaries of the International Flower-show in 1866, and was for many years secretary to the floral committee and floral director of the Royal Horticultural Society. Moore was elected a fellow of the Linnean Society in 1851, and was also a member of the Pelargonium, Carnation, Auricula, and Dahlia Societies. He was constantly called upon to act as judge at horticultural shows, and only a short time before his death was engaged in classifying the Narcissi for the Daffodil Congress. After three or four years of infirm health, he died at the Chelsea Botanical Garden on 1 January 1887, and was buried in Brompton cemetery.

== Works ==
Besides papers on ferns in various botanical journals, Moore's chief publications were :

- Handbook of British Ferns, 16mo, 1848,
- Popular History of British Ferns, 8vo, 1851, 2nd edit. 1855, abridged as British Ferns and their Allies, 8vo, 1859, and also issued, with coloured illustrations by William Stephen Coleman in 1861.
- Ferns of Great Britain and Ireland, edited by J. Lindley, and nature-printed by II. Bradbury, fol., 1855, and in 2 vols. 8vo, 1859.
- Index Filicum, 8vo, twenty parts, ending at the letter G, 1857-63.
- Illustrations of Orchidaceous Plants, 8vo, 1857.
- The Field Botanist's Companion, 8vo, 1862, of which a new edition appeared in 1867 as British Wild Flowers.
- The Elements of Botany for Families and Schools, 10th edit. 1865, 11th edit. 1875.
- The Treasury of Botany, with John Lindley, 2 vols. 8vo, 1866, 2nd edit. 1874.
- The Clematis as a Garden Flower, with George Jackman, 8vo, 1872.
- Thompson's Gardener's Assistant, 2nd ed. 8vo, 1876.

Moore also wrote the article 'Horticulture' in the ninth edition of the Encyclopædia Britannica, in conjunction with Dr. Maxwell Masters, afterwards published in an expanded form as The Epitome of Gardening, 8vo, 1881.
