= Charlotte Adams (writer) =

- Born: 1793
- Died: March 9, 1873 (aged 79–80); Manchester Square
- Occupation: Novelist, children's writer
- Spouse(s): John Adams
- Children: Charles Warren Adams, Walter Marsham Adams
- Parent(s): John Coker; Charlotte Marsham

Charlotte Adams (1793 – March 9, 1873) was an English author of children's books.

She was born Charlotte Priscilla Coker in 1793, the daughter of John Coker of Bicester and Hon. Charlotte Marsham, daughter of Robert Marsham, 2nd Baron Romney. In 1826, she married serjeant-at-law John Adams as his third wife. She became stepmother to John Adams' four sons, including novelist Henry Cadwallader Adams and the Rev. William Adams. She would have four children with John Adams, including novelist Charles Warren Adams and Egyptologist Walter Marsham Adams.

Charlotte Adams died on March 9, 1873 in Manchester Square, London.

== Bibliography ==
- The Poor Child's Friend: Consisting of Narratives Founded on Fact, and Religious and Moral Subjects. Harvey and Darton, 1825.
- The Stolen Child; or, Laura's Adventures. London, 1838.
- The Child of the Atlantic. 1 vol. London: John W. Parker, 1839.
- The Etonian, and Geoffrey Selwood. 1 vol. London: L. Booth, 1841.
- William Woodland. London, 1845.
- Little Servant Maids. 1 vol. London: S. P. C. K., 1848.
- Edgar Clifton: or, Right and Wrong. A Story of School Life. 1 vol. Bath: Binns and Goodwin, 1852.
- Ben Howard: or, Truth and Honesty. 1 vol. London: Routledge, 1853.
- Boys at Home. 1 vol. London: Routledge, 1854.
- Matilda Lonsdale: or, The Eldest Sister. 1 vol. London: Routledge, 1855.
- The Errand Boy: or, Your Time is Your Employer's. 1 vol. London: S. P. C. K., 1858.
- The Useful Little Girl. 1 vol. London: S. P. C. K., 1865.
- Laura and Lucy: or, The Two Friends. 1 vol. London: Frederick Warne, 1866.
- John Hartley and How He Got on in Life. 1 vol. London: Routledge, 1867.
