= Carles Mulet Garcia =

Spanish politician

Carles Mulet García
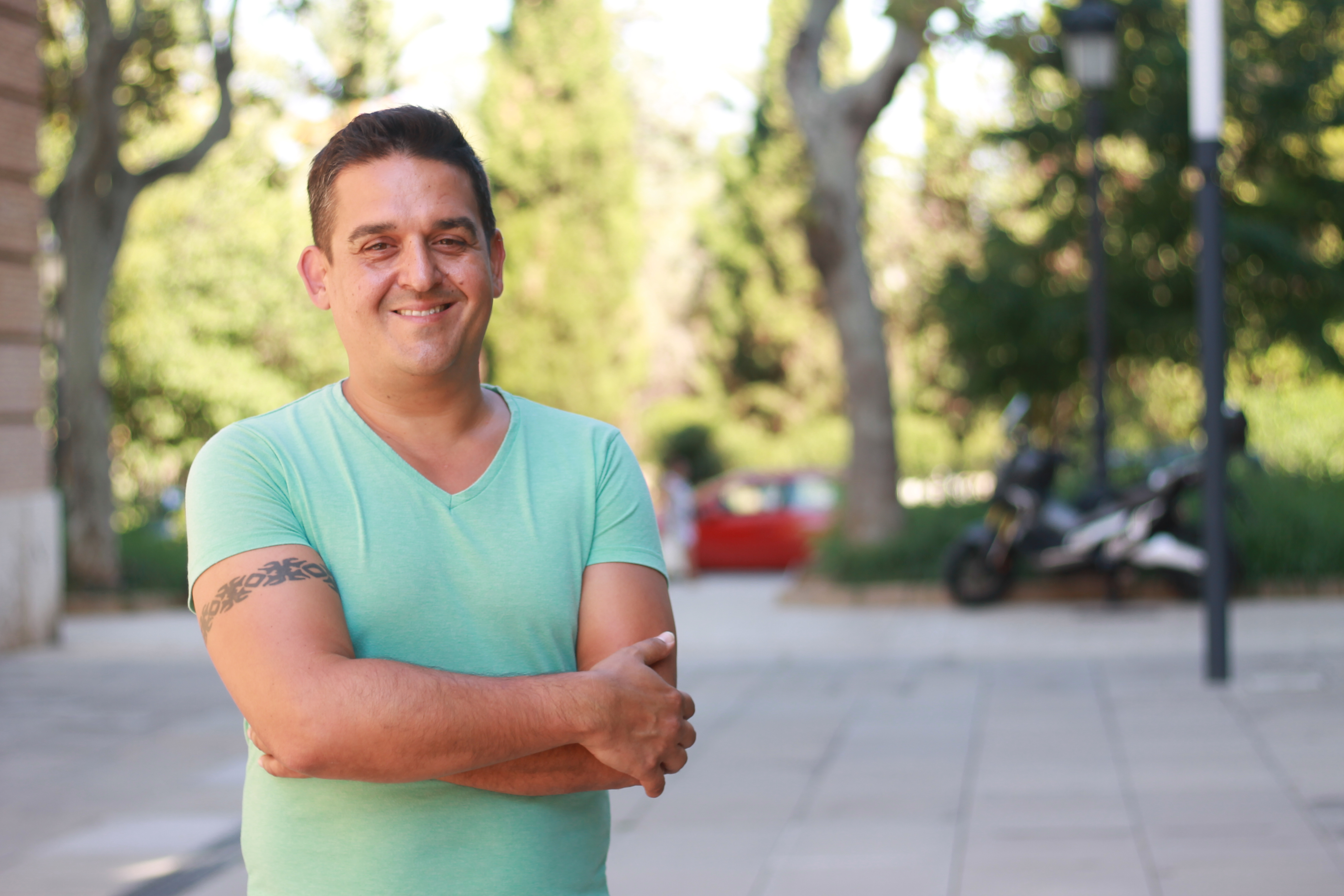
- Carles Mulet Garcia is a Spanish politician and senator.

Senator in the Cortes Generales by appointment of the Cortes Valencianas
- Incumbent
- Assumed office 23 July 2015

Personal details
- Born: 19 April 1975 (age 51) Castellón de la Plana
- Citizenship: Spain

Carles Mulet Garcia (born 19 April 1975 in Castellón de la Plana) is a Spanish politician and senator. He is a senator by appointment in the Senate of Spain representing the Valencian Parliament of Coalició Compromís. He was appointed into the Senate of Spain by the Valencian Parliament on 23 July 2015.

During the plenary session of the Senate on 13 April 2016, he became the first senator to speak in the Leonese language in a plenary session of the Senate of Spain.
