= Edward Moxon =

British poet and publisher

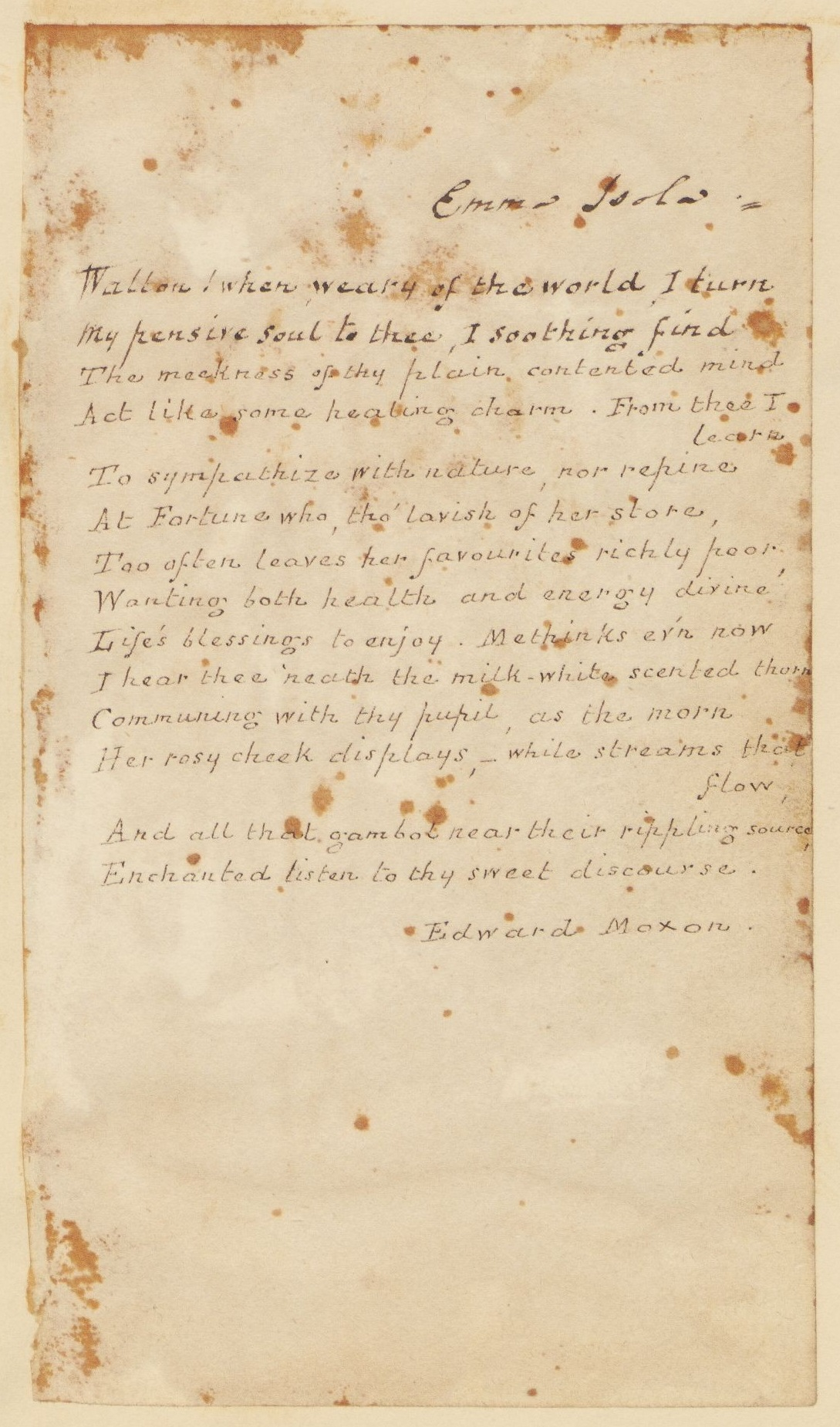
Manuscript of a poem by Edward Moxon

Edward Moxon (12 December 1801 – 3 June 1858) was a British poet and publisher, significant in Victorian literature.

== Biography ==
Moxon was born at Wakefield in Yorkshire, where his father Michael worked in the wool trade. In 1817 he left for London, joining Longman in 1821. In 1826, encouraged by his friend Charles Lamb, he published a volume of verse, entitled The Prospect, and other Poems, which was received favourably.

In 1830 Moxon started his own publishing firm in New Bond Street, aided by a £500 loan from Samuel Rogers. The first volume he produced was Charles Lamb's Album Verses. Moxon also published an illustrated edition of Rogers's Italy in 1830, £10,000 being spent upon the illustrations. Moving to 44 Dover Street, Piccadilly in 1833, Moxon married Emma Isola, the orphan adopted by Charles and Mary Lamb, in the same year. The couple went on to have five daughters and one son.

William Wordsworth entrusted him with the publication of his works from 1835 onwards, and in 1839 he issued the first complete edition of Percy Bysshe Shelley's poems, edited by Mary Shelley.

Atheistic passages in Shelley's Queen Mab and unusual circumstances resulted in the Chartist Henry Hetherington prosecuting Moxon for blasphemous libel as a test of the law. The case was tried before Lord Denman, and Moxon was defended by his friend Serjeant Talfourd. The jury returned a guilty verdict, but the prosecution declined to seek any punishment.

Moxon continued to publish: in 1840 he published Robert Browning's Sordello and James Stanislaus Bell's Journal of a Residence in Circassia, and in succeeding years works by Richard Monckton Milnes, Tom Hood, Barry Cornwall, Lord Lytton, Browning, John Keats and Alfred Tennyson appeared. Both Tennyson and Wordsworth were to become personal friends of Moxon. On Moxon's death, his business was continued by the printer Frederick Evans and later James Bertrand Payne, with input from Moxon's widow Emma and his son Arthur. In 1865 the firm published Algernon Charles Swinburne's Atalanta in Calydon; in 1871 it was taken over by Ward, Lock & Tyler.
