= John Nicholas Tresidder =

- Born: 10 January 1819
- Died: 27 May 1889; Dulwich, London
- Occupation: Physician
- Known for: Photography

John Nicholas Tresidder (10 January 1819-27 May 1889) was a British medical doctor in the Indian Medical Service and photographer, known for his images of India between 1853 and 1867.

== Career ==
From 1842 to 1877, Tresidder was in the Indian Medical Service. He served in the First Anglo-Sikh War, and then in the Second Anglo-Sikh War in 1849. In 1854 he was appointed Civil surgeon at Kanpur. He returned to India in October 1857 following a period of furlough, thereby escaping the massacre of British people in Kanpur in the summer of 1857. That year he joined the 42nd Regiment, and witnessed the punishments ordered by Neill.

Tresidder's London exhibition of photographs in 1862 included his collection taken in Kanpur in 1858. His photos included that of Jwala Pershad on 3 May 1859, and Moulvi Salumut Ali at the age of 104. He photographed Satti Chaura Ghat, Gungoo Mehter, and Henry Havelock's approach to the Kanpur well. His image of Pershad has frequently been mistaken for Tatya Tope.

== Death and legacy ==
Tresidder died on 27 May 1889 at Dulwich, England. His album of photographs is held at the Alkazi Foundation for the Arts, New Delhi.

== Bibliography ==
- Llewellyn-Jones, Rosie, ed. (2017). The Uprising Of 1857: The Alkazi Collection of Photography. Ahmedabad: Mapin Publishing Pvt. Limited. ISBN 978-93-85360-11-4.
