= Mullet River =

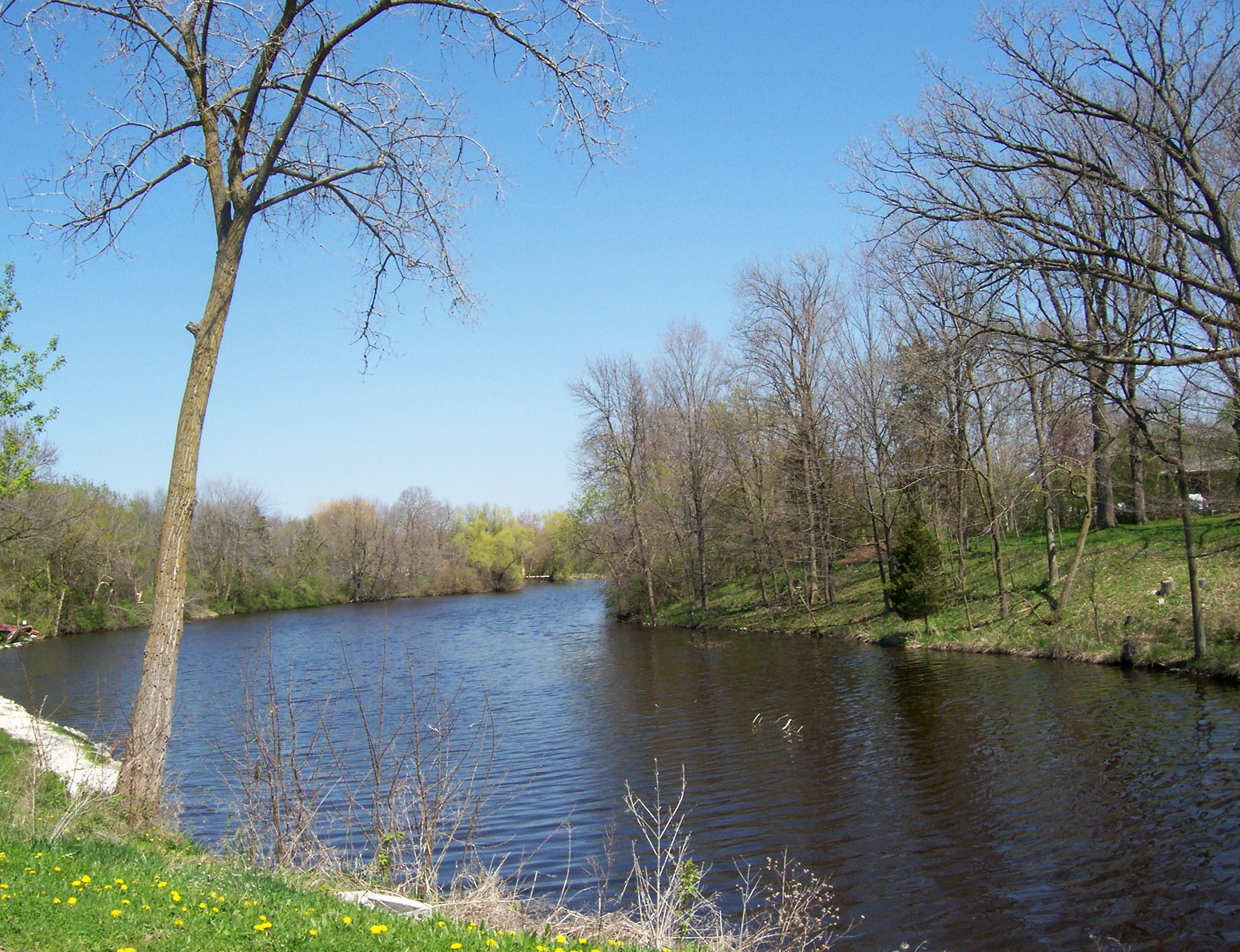
- The Mullet River in Glenbeulah in 2007

Location
- Country: United States
- State: Wisconsin

Physical characteristics
- Source: Mullet Lake
  - location: Forest, Fond du Lac County
  - coordinates: 43°43′23″N 88°13′20″W
  - elevation: 1,027 ft (313 m)
- Mouth: Sheboygan River
  - location: Sheboygan Falls, Sheboygan County
  - coordinates: 43°43′25″N 87°49′40″W
  - elevation: 663 ft (202 m)
- Length: 40 mi (64 km)
- Basin size: 88.19 mi^{2} (228.4 km^{2})

The Mullet River is a tributary of the Sheboygan River, 40 miles (64 km) long, in eastern Wisconsin in the United States. Via the Sheboygan, it is part of the watershed of Lake Michigan, draining an area of 88 square miles (228 km²) in a primarily agricultural area of the Eastern Ridges and Lowlands region of Wisconsin.

== River course ==
The Mullet River issues from Mullet Lake in the town of Forest in eastern Fond du Lac County and flows generally eastwardly into Sheboygan County, passing through the village of Glenbeulah and the city of Plymouth. It joins the Sheboygan River from the south in the city of Sheboygan Falls. As of 2001, there were five dams on the river. In the town of Greenbush in western Sheboygan County, the Wisconsin Historical Society maintains a functioning replica of the Herrling Sawmill on the river; the original turbine-powered sawmill stood on the same location from 1854 to 1910.

== Variant names ==
According to the Geographic Names Information System, the Mullet River has also been known as "Mullet Creek," and by the spelling "Mullett River." The United States Board on Geographic Names issued a decision clarifying "Mullet River" as the stream's name in 1976.

== See also ==
- List of Wisconsin rivers
