= Alois Auer =

Austrian printer, inventor and botanical illustrator

Alois Auer von Welsbach
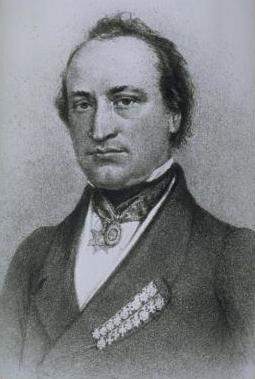
- Born: Alois Auer; 11 May 1813; Wels, Austrian Empire
- Died: 10 July 1869 (aged 56)
- Other name: Alois Ritter Auer von Welsbach
- Spouse: Therese Neuditschka
- Children: 4, including Carl Auer von Welsbach

Alois Auer (11 May 1813 – 10 July 1869) was an Austrian printer, inventor and botanical illustrator, most active during the 1840s and 1850s. He produced a number of works in German and other languages, including the first regarding the nature printing process. He was the director of the Austrian state's official printing house (Hof- und Staatsdruckerei), which created illustrated volumes of scientific interest and produced many advances in printing technology. His full name in later life, incorporating the Austrian hereditary knighthood that he was given in 1860, was Alois Ritter Auer von Welsbach.

== Life and career ==
Born in the Austrian city of Wels, Auer was trained as a compositor. In his leisure moments, he studied French, Italian, English and other languages, in which he underwent an examination in 1835 and 1836 at the University of Vienna. Auer's early career began in October 1837 with an appointment as professor of Italian at a gymnasium in Linz. He acquired fluency in other languages during his travels in Germany, Switzerland, France and England; that trip began in 1839.

Auer studied the typographical techniques that he would use when he became director of the printing office of the Viennese court in 1841. The ornamental typefaces that he implemented allowed greater flexibility in printing, and the enterprise was to become highly successful, meeting the requirements of 500 European dialects (exclusive of those Russian, Turkish and Hebrew) and almost 150 languages of the world. Under his management, the Imperial printing office became one of the largest establishments of its kind in Europe. He remained there until 1868.

The first published work on 'nature printing' (German: Naturselbstdruck) was The Discovery of the Nature Printing-Process (1853). In this, he detailed the use of actual plant material, rocks and lace, impressed upon lead or into gum, to demonstrate what he saw as a major advance in the productions of botanical works. His intention was to produce 'artistical-scientific objects', while greatly reducing the problems of producing herbaries and other works of natural history. Another illustrator, Henry Bradbury, began producing work by a similar process after seeing Auer's invention.

The interest in the natural sciences, physics and languages was met by publications that included his own works. The various printing processes and an extensive history of the Staatsdruckerei state printing house itself. Apart from the volumes and plates produced by the nature printing process, he also produced some of the earliest books to incorporate photographs. The publication of photomicrography is given to be the first.

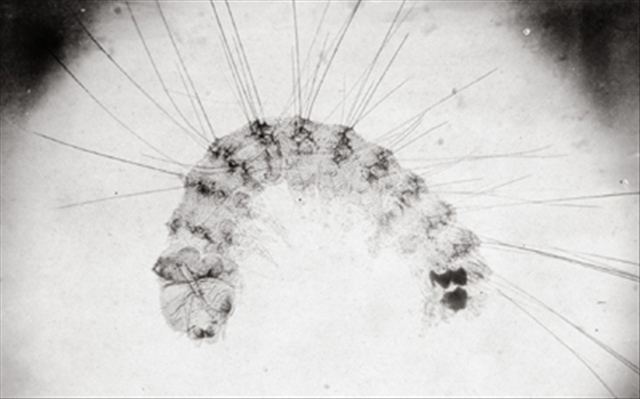
"Polygraphie" by Alois Auer, 1853 (albumenized salt photographic print)

He invented a 'typometrical' system, facilitating the use of a large number of foreign alphabets with ornamental type to be used in printing. This was described in his work Der polygraphische Apparat der Wiener k.k. Hof- und Staatsdruckerei ("The Polygraphical Apparatus of the Viennese Imperial–royal Court and State Printer").

Auer's directorship at the Royal and State Printing oversaw many advances in automatic high-speed press, copperplate press, and new typographical processes. In Vienna in 1858, Auer patented a web press that printed newspapers from a continuous roll of paper; the press was developed in the United States by William Bullock five years later.

Auer lectured in languages, and later took up the directorship of the Austrian state's porcelain factory.

== Family ==
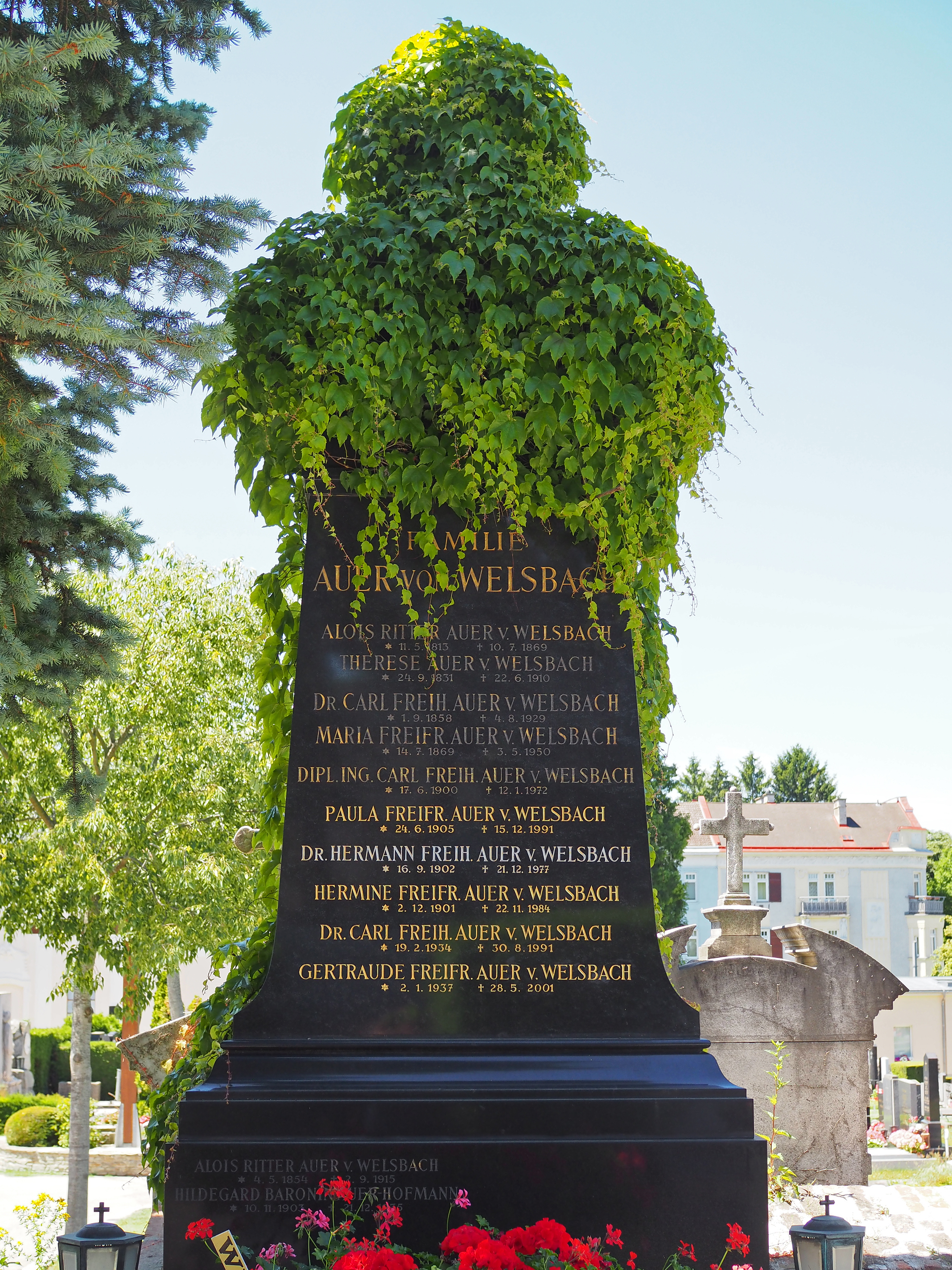
The Auer von Welsbach family's monument at Hietzing Cemetery in Vienna, 2017

He was the father of Carl Auer von Welsbach (1858–1929), the Austrian scientist who separated didymium into the elements neodymium and praseodymium in 1885.

== Works ==
Besides the works mentioned above, he produced Die Sprachenhalle oder das Vaterunser in 608 Sprachen (English: The Hall of Languages or the Our Father in 608 languages), with Roman types (1844); and Das Vaterunser in 206 Sprachen (English: The Lord's Prayer in 206 languages), with their national alphabets (1847).

== See also ==
- Auer (surname)
