= Bouverie Street =

Street in the City of London, England

Coordinates: 51.51345°N 0.10796°W

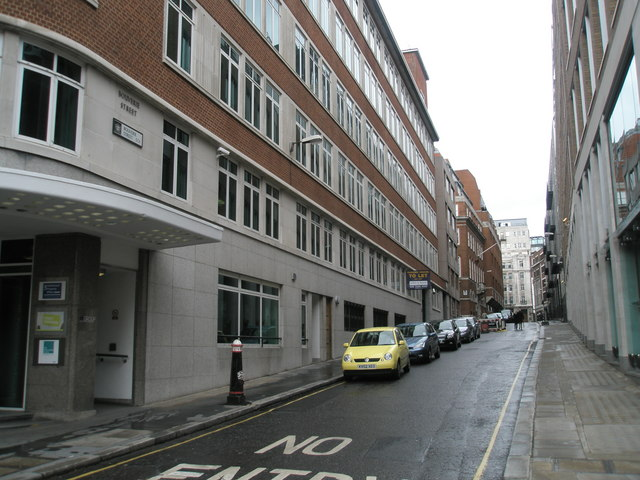
Bouverie Street pictured in 2008

Bouverie Street is a street in the City of London, off Fleet Street, which once was the home of some of Britain's most widely circulated newspapers as well as the Whitefriars Priory.

The offices of the News Chronicle, a British daily paper, were based there until it ceased publication on 17 October 1960 after being absorbed into the Daily Mail. The News of the World had its offices at No. 30 until its move to Wapping in the mid-1980s. Bouverie Street was also the location of the offices of Punch magazine until the 1990s, and for some decades of those of the Lutterworth Press, one of Britain's oldest independent publishers, celebrated for The Boy's Own Paper and its sister The Girl's Own Paper.

The street's name comes from the landlords of the area, the Pleydell-Bouveries, Earls of Radnor.

The Planet News Press Photo Agency was based at 8 Bouverie Street until the WWII Blitz forced them to relocate to no. 3 Johnson's Court, just across Fleet Street. The surviving glass plate negative collection is owned by TopFoto.

== See also ==
- List of eponymous roads in London
