= Once a Week (magazine) =

British weekly illustrated literary magazine

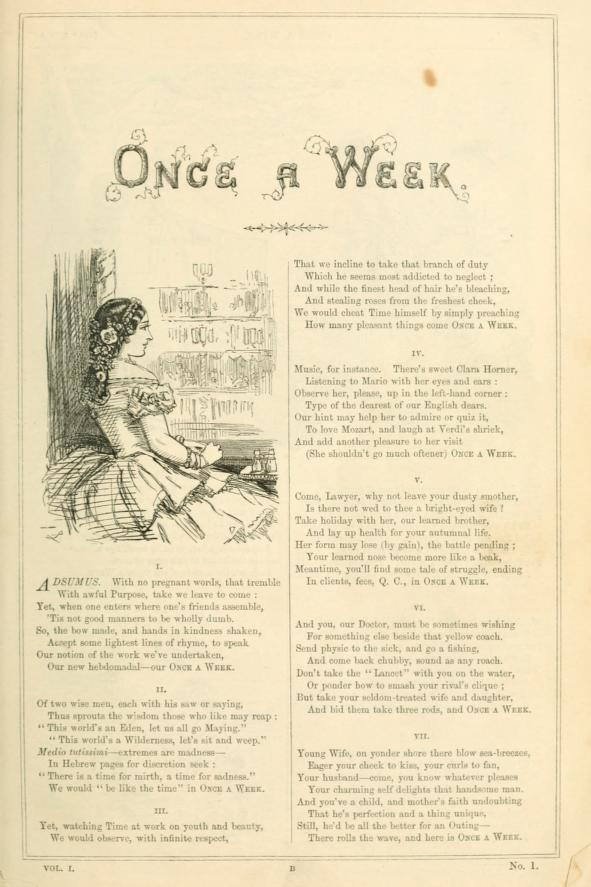
Once A Week Pg.1, Vol.1, No.1 July 2, 1859

Once A Week was a British weekly illustrated literary magazine published by Bradbury & Evans from 1859 to 1880. According to John Sutherland, "historically the magazine's main achievement was to provide an outlet for [an] innovative group of illustrators [in] the 1860s."

== History and profile ==
The magazine was founded because of a dispute between Bradbury and Evans and Charles Dickens. Bradbury and Evans had been Dickens' publisher since 1844, including publishing his magazine Household Words. In 1859, Bradbury and Evans refused to carry an advertisement by Dickens explaining why he had broken with Mrs. Dickens. In consequence, Dickens stopped work on Household Words and founded a new magazine, All The Year Round (first published 30 April 1859) which he decided would be editorially independent of any publisher. Bradbury and Evans responded by founding Once A Week, with veteran editor and abolitionist hero Samuel Lucas at the head.

The magazine differed from Household Words in that it was more expensive and it was illustrated. Notable illustrators included John Leech, Hablot K. Browne, Frederick Sandys, Holman Hunt, John Tenniel and George du Maurier. Notable writers included Mark Lemon, Shirley Brooks, Harriet Martineau (who wrote here under the pseudonym "From the Mountain"), and Tom Taylor. Many of the illustrators and writers also worked for Punch, another Bradbury and Evans literary magazine. Helen Hoppner Coode, Punch's first woman cartoonist, also contributed illustrations to Once a Week, this included drawings for the poem "Fairy May" written by C. W. Goodhart which was printed in the magazine in 1859.

The magazine's central feature was serial fiction; among other works, it published Charles Reade's A Good Fight, George Meredith's Evan Harrington and Charles Felix's The Notting Hill Mystery, an early detective novel. Woman writers whose work was featured in the magazine included Isabella Blagden, and M.E. Braddon.

After Lucas died in 1865, his assistant Edward Walford succeeded him as editor. However, the magazine went into decline. Although it had strong sales it was probably under-priced. The magazine was purchased by James Rice, who owned it until 1873 when it was bought by George Manville Fenn; by then it was "a shadow of its former self". Publication ceased in 1880.
