= The House in Paris =

1935 novel by Elizabeth Bowen

- First US edition
- Author: Elizabeth Bowen
- Language: English
- Published: 1935 (Gollancz) (UK); Knopf (US)
- Media type: Print
- Preceded by: To the North (1932)
- Followed by: The Death of the Heart (1938)

The House in Paris is Elizabeth Bowen's fifth novel. It is set in France and Great Britain following World War I, and its action takes place on a single February day in a house in Paris. In that house, two young children—Henrietta and Leopold—await the next legs of their respective journeys: Henrietta is passing through on her way to meet her grandmother, while Leopold is waiting to meet his mother for the first time. The first and third sections of the novel, both called "The Present," detail what happens in the house throughout the day. The middle section of the book ("The Past") is an imagined chronicle of part of the life of Leopold's mother, Karen Michaelis, revealing the background to the events that occur in Mme Fisher's home on the day.

First published in 1935, it was well received by critics past and present, and has received praise from Virginia Woolf and A. S. Byatt. The novel combines techniques of realism and modernism, and was referred to as her "most complex work." Bowen revisits themes and structures familiar from her earlier novels; the tri-partite structure and the ten-year gap between past and present, for instance, had been used earlier in Friends and Relations, but unlike that novel, The House in Paris finds an escape from a tragic past, by way of a "magical child of myths, an archetypal redeemer."

== Summary ==
=== Part I: The Present ===
The novel opens in Paris, early in the morning, as eleven-year-old Henrietta Mountjoy, accompanied by Miss Naomi Fisher, travels via taxi to the house of Naomi's mother Mme Fisher, an elderly and sickly lady who for years has taken in well-off girls for a season. Henrietta is travelling to Menton, in the south of France, to spend time with her grandmother, Mrs. Arbuthnot. Mme Fisher tells Henrietta that she will be spending her day with Leopold, a nine-year-old boy who is supposed to meet his mother there for the first time; Miss Fisher asks Henrietta to "be a little considerate with Leopold", and "to ask Leopold nothing". After breakfast and a nap in the salon, Henrietta awakens to find Leopold standing before her. The two young children talk about their life: Leopold explains Mme Fisher's illness and his own anticipation regarding the arrival of his mother later that day; Henrietta reveals to Leopold that her mother is dead. Even though Leopold angers Henrietta by spilling the contents of her handbag, the two children develop a rapport.

Miss Fisher leads Henrietta to Mme Fisher's room. While they are upstairs, Leopold rummages through Miss Fisher's handbag, discovering three envelopes. He disregards the first, a letter pertaining to Henrietta. The second envelope, with a Berlin postmark, is from his mother, but the envelope is empty, and he feels that Miss Fisher has "done him down." The third envelope contains a letter from Marian Grant Moody, his adoptive mother, to Miss Fisher. Besides discussing the boy's itinerary, she writes exhaustively of Leopold's delicate and rather unstable constitution, and says more than once that the boy has not had a sex education yet, so any explanation of his birth will have to be handled delicately.

Leopold returns to the first envelope concerning Henrietta, written to Miss Fisher by Henrietta's grandmother, Mrs. Arbuthnot. Referring repeatedly to her old acquaintance and present addressee as "Miss Kingfisher", she informs Miss Fisher that Henrietta is to spend the remainder of the winter with Mrs. Arbuthnot in the south of France, and should only be staying a day in Paris. The tone of the letter is manipulative: Mrs. Arbuthnot subtly chastises Miss Fisher for not visiting her, all the while asking that Henrietta be allowed to spend the day in Paris.

During this time, Henrietta is introduced to Mme Fisher in her upstairs bedroom. As Miss Fisher sits knitting, her mother and the young girl converse, Mme Fisher frequently critiquing her daughter, commenting on her own bad health, and, ultimately, discussing Leopold: Henrietta learns that Leopold's now-dead father at one time broke her daughter's heart.

Henrietta then returns to the salon and discovers Leopold going through the handbag. The section concludes with the arrival of a telegram, summarised by Miss Fisher: "Your mother is not coming; she cannot come."

=== Part II: The Past ===
"Meetings that do not come off keep a character of their own." The novel's second section shifts back a decade to the story of Leopold's parents. The introductory pages of the section make clear that this the entire section is imaginary, perhaps a long and dramatic imaginative vision on Leopold's part. The section contains the information that might have been exchanged between Karen and Leopold should she have actually kept her promise to her son and arrived as scheduled that day in Paris.

Karen Michaelis, ten years or so before the day of the previous section, is sailing from her native England to visit her Aunt Violet and Uncle Bill Bent at Rushbrooke, County Cork, Ireland. Karen is escaping the pressures of her recent engagement to Ray Forrestier, ambivalent about the wedding; Ray himself is on a business trip. Her time with Uncle Bill and Aunt Violet is rather uneventful and uninspiring until Uncle Bill, a nervous and socially inadequate man, tells Karen that Violet is to have surgery in the coming weeks, a procedure that could prove fatal. Back in England, Karen finds Naomi Fisher waiting for her; she has travelled to London to see to the affairs of her recently deceased aunt, and tells Karen of her engagement to Max Ebhart, whom Karen met years before while she was one of the girls staying at Mme Fisher's house. Despite Karen's objections – she had always been afraid of Max – Naomi insists the three spend time together before Max and Naomi return home.

During a picnic, Max and Karen come close, sharing a secret touch and holding hands. Afterward, Karen resigns herself to her upcoming marriage, but before too long, the Michaelis family receives news of Aunt Violet's death, and once again things are in a state of disorder. During this chaotic time Max telephones and speaks to Karen. They meet clandestinely in Boulogne and spend the day together. Max reveals that Mme Fisher believes her daughter is not good enough for him, but according to Max, Naomi is an acceptable match, simply because she is "like furniture or the dark", comfortable and reassuring. Ultimately, however, she evokes no passion in him. Likewise, Karen confides that she does not wish to marry Ray. They part, but meet again on Folkestone pier the following Saturday, spending the remainder of the day and evening in a hotel room. Karen awakens in the middle of the night and while examining her and Max's shared circumstances, she develops a type of unconscious awareness of Leopold, despite having no clear evidence he will eventually exist, suggested by the author in second person: "All the same, the idea of you, Leopold, began to be present with her."

The following day, Max writes a letter to Naomi, explaining his relationship with and feelings for Karen. Karen implores him to rethink the revelation, specifically the unreality of the arrangement ("You and I are the dream. Go back to her".) She tears up the letter, and they agree that while Naomi must be made aware of the affair, it is best both to write her and tell her in person. Karen's rendezvous with Max is eventually discovered by Mrs. Michaelis, and while Karen tries to explain the relationship, Mrs. Michaelis cannot understand.

Next, Karen learns through the French newspapers that Max has committed suicide, and Naomi arrives in London, where she explains the circumstances surrounding his death: after receiving his letter and informing Mme Fisher of his intentions, Naomi is quarantined by her mother, who intends to keep Naomi from seeing Max and removing any possibility of spoiling Max's chance for happiness with Karen. Max does visit Naomi, however, speaking to her of the failure inherent in his relationship with Karen: "'What she and I are' he said, 'is outside life; we shall fail.'" He is visibly distressed as Mme Fisher returns to the salon. Naomi returns to her upstairs bedroom. There is a commotion in the salon, and Naomi returns to find her mother strewn across the sofa and blood on the floor. Max has cut his own wrist, making his way out the door into the street, and dying in an alley. In the following days, Mme Fisher will observe that "it was the commendation he could not bear. I was commending him when he took his knife out." At the end of the section, Karen reveals to Naomi that she is pregnant with Max's child, and will leave for Germany to try to avoid any scandal.

=== Part III: The Present ===
The first sentence of the last section repeats the last sentence of the first: "Your mother is not coming; she cannot come." Leopold again imagines how the meeting would have gone if it had occurred. Henrietta senses Leopold's disappointment; she holds him and cries. Miss Fisher reenters the salon, informing Leopold that Mme Fisher would like to see him.

Not unlike the earlier exchange with Henrietta, the conversation between Leopold and Mme Fisher is uncomfortable and at times Mme Fisher is blunt, even cruel. She attempts to explain Karen's unique nature to the disconsolate boy, abandoning any of those delicacies requested in Marian Grant Moody's earlier letter. She explains Leopold his history, including the details of his birth, the death of his half-sibling, his adoption, and his general displacement in the world. Leopold begs to remain in the house, exclaiming, "At Spezia when I am angry I go full of smoke inside, but when you make me angry I see everything." At this point Miss Fisher returns to the room and whisks Leopold away again.

Ray Forrestier is waiting in the salon for Leopold. When the child arrives, their interaction is strained, distant, and uncomfortable. A good portion of the narrative focuses on Ray's conflicting feelings about Leopold, his marriage to Karen, the child's inescapable presence in their shared life, and Ray's own situational obligations. Ultimately, Ray and Leopold leave the house together, dropping off Henrietta at the train station on the way; the two children say their goodbyes and head off in different directions.

== Themes ==
=== Time ===
The past and present are constantly intertwined in The House in Paris, and the middle section, "The Past," is an imagined history. Characters in the past already have in mind future characters and events. For example, hours after conceiving Leopold, Karen thinks about her son as if he already exists: "the idea of you, Leopold, began to be present with her." This thought of Karen's is, in the end, Leopold's, since he imagines these events; the reader learns Leopold's past while he does, "simultaneously gaining information from disconnected fragments derived from a combination of hints and opinions filtered through all he experiences in the house in Paris." Bowen herself discussed the "bendability" of time in an essay published in 1951, in which she discusses "factitious memory": "one route to the past (or the idea of the past) is factitious memory. That is to say, by art we are made to seem to remember that which we have not actually known."

=== Stasis ===
Throughout The House in Paris, characters do not successfully go anywhere, either geographically or emotionally. Marian Kelly sees Bowen's narrative structure deliberately slowing down her plot: "the middle section moves backward and so produces a stasis that interrupts the forward momentum of the text". In the past, Karen for years maintained an unrequited, hopeless love for Max, but when they finally became involved, she could not enjoy a fulfilling relationship with him. Instead, she remained tethered to her caste: "she had been born and was making her marriage inside the class that in England changes least of all....This was the world she sometimes wished to escape from but, through her marriage, meant to inhabit still". In the more recent present, Mme Fisher has been putting off the sale of her Parisian house until her death, although she acknowledges that she has been waiting to die for nearly a decade. Also, the reader learns that Leopold's development and maturity have been continuously stunted by his adoptive family, who have kept him in a state of perpetual dependency. Both he and the text's other child, Henrietta, remain in transit throughout the entire novel, never arriving at their destinations. Finally, Karen prolongs her reunions with Leopold and Naomi, both of whom have been waiting for years to see her; on a lesser scale, Henrietta's grandmother, in her letter to "Kingfisher" (that is, Naomi Fisher), claims that she has been waiting for a visit from her.

=== Betrayal and secrecy ===
The novel is concerned throughout with betrayal and secrecy. Karen betrayed her mother by not revealing Aunt Violet's terminal illness during her remaining weeks of life; in fact, the narrator reports that "Karen did not even ask herself why she had said nothing." Mme Fisher betrayed Naomi by encouraging Max to choose Karen, enabling Max and Karen to begin their affair and betray their respective fiancés, while Karen betrayed Naomi as well: when Karen admonishes Max, "you cannot do that to Naomi," Max responds, "Did you always think so much of her?" Maud Ellmann even asserts that Karen only loves Max "precisely because he is another woman's". Later, after Karen has conceived her illegitimate child, Mrs. Michaelis betrays her husband by sending Karen on a year of supposed European travel and study, just as Karen further betrays Ray by secretly giving birth to and then giving away an illegitimate son. In the present, Karen still betrays her father, who is desperate for grandchildren, by hiding his grandson's existence. Ultimately, Karen betrays Leopold at the eleventh hour when she refuses to meet him in Paris, a betrayal underscored by the repeated message to Leopold, "Your mother is not coming; she cannot come." Because of Karen's betrayal of Leopold, Bennett and Royle qualified The House in Paris as "Bowen's most rigorous and unremittingly clairvoyant elaboration of the structure and effects of psychic trauma. The House in Paris is what we propose to call a traumaturgy, both a work and theory of wounds." Finally, Ray betrays the Grant Moody foster family by stealing Leopold at the novel's close. There is so much secrecy throughout the text that, according to Marian Kelly, "Bowen forces readers into the position of detective by making constant deduction at the level of both conversational references and character psychology a central element of reading her novel".

=== Motherhood ===
Elizabeth Bowen classifies motherhood as a central problem in The House in Paris. The machinations of Mme Fisher, of course, are the worst of all of the novel's mothers. In the past Max recalled of Mme Fisher, "she acted on me like acid on a plate," while Karen thought, "She is a woman who sells girls; she is a witch." After Mme Fisher contributed to Max's suicide, even her daughter Naomi "saw then, that evil dominated our house." In fact, Neil Corcoran sees Mme Fisher as "quasi-vampiric," since she "does indeed draw blood from Max, when he slits his wrist in the house in front of her." Additionally, Mrs. Michaelis presented some apathy and detachment to her daughter, although Karen went so far as to classify her mother as "ruthless." At one point, Karen was aware that her mother's passive-aggressive parenting caused a key power shift between them: "She has made me lie for a week. She will hold me inside the lie till she makes me lose the power I felt I had." Aware of these troubling examples, in the present Karen longs to correct her abandonment and be a "natural mother" to Leopold, but her son realises that "she would not lend herself to him." Neil Corcoran calls Leopold's reaction to his mother's failure "the novel's most concentrated expression of the psychological and emotional wounding that is parentlessness." Bowen's attention to motherhood continues throughout her oeuvre, attending to difficult maternal figures like Mrs. Kelway in The Heat of the Day and Lady Naylor in The Last September, for example.

=== Houses ===
Houses loom large in Bowen's work (as is evident in Bowen's Court, her 1946 book memorialising her ancestral house, Bowen's Court, one of the Irish great houses, which she was forced to sell and which was subsequently demolished) and in The House in Paris the main setting is the house where Naomi and Mme Fisher live, which is characterised as full, stuffy, and oppressive: "The inside of this house—with its shallow door-panels, lozenge door-knobs, polished brass ball on the end of the banisters, stuffy red matt paper with stripes so artfully shadowed as to appear bars—was more than simply novel to Henrietta, it was antagonistic, as though it had been invented to put her out. She felt the house was acting, nothing seemed to be natural; objects did not wait to be seen but came crowding in on her, each with what amounted to its aggressive cry." Naomi's deceased aunt's home in Twickenham is similarly described, though there is a suggestion of future redemption: "the aunt's house was hollow, completely dead. But someone else would move in almost at once, and be here next spring, no doubt, to enjoy the cherry." A third house is the home of Colonel and Violet Bent lived in Rushbrook, the house in Ireland that Karen briefly visited before returning to the Michaelis home in Chester Terrace, Regent's Park, London. But that Irish home is itself a replacement of an earlier great house, the ancestral home of Colonel Bent, which was burned during the Irish War of Independence.

== Style and genre ==
Bowen's writing style frequently involves a slow pace that builds to a climax, and a usage of free indirect discourse and stream of consciousness. While in many of Bowen's novels modernism and realism mix, and sometimes clash, The House in Paris is usually characterised as modernist.

== Publication history ==
The House in Paris was first published in 1935 by London-based Victor Gollancz for English audiences. Perhaps thinking of them, Gollancz wrote in a letter to Bowen, "I wonder if you realize how un-English it is?" Alfred A. Knopf published the novel for American audiences one year later. In 1972, Penguin released an edition of the novel with an introduction by A.S. Byatt, and re-released it in 1987; this edition was republished in 2002 by Anchor Books.

== Critical reception ==
An early admirer of The House in Paris was Virginia Woolf, a good friend of Bowen's. In a letter about the book, Woolf wrote, "I had the feeling that your world imposed itself on my world, while I read, which only happens when one is taken in hand by a work." A.S. Byatt, in her introduction to the 1976 Penguin edition, stated she had been reading the novel since the age of ten.

Though Bowen is generally acknowledged as "an important twentieth-century English (and Anglo-Irish) writer," she is not widely read. The House in Paris was written during a period of great activity (she published four novels and a short story collection in the 1930s, besides writing literary reviews), and received positive reviews.

== Adaptation ==
The novel was adapted into the 1959 BBC television film of the same name.
