= Sylvia Cooke-Collis =

Irish painter

- Born: 1900; Glanmire, County Cork, Ireland
- Died: 7 February 1973 (aged 72–73)
- Occupation: Painter
- Spouse: Maurice Talbot Cooke-Collis (1932–?)
- Parents: Henry Cecil Phillips (father); Hilda Margaret Workman-Macnaghten (mother)

Sylvia Cooke-Collis (1900 – 7 February 1973) was an Irish painter who worked mainly in oils, gouache, and watercolour.

== Life ==
Sylvia Margaret Phillips was born at Glanmire, County Cork to Hilda Margaret Workman-Macnaghten (1868–1961) and Captain Henry Cecil Phillips (1851–1905). She spent her early childhood at Clifford House, Castletownroche. Following her father's death in 1905, and her mother's marriage to Richard Arthur Grove Annesley (1879–1966) on 7 March 1907, she and her brother Philip moved to Annes Grove.

She married Maurice Talbot Cooke-Collis on 7 April 1932 at St Mary's Church, Castletownroche. The ceremony was officiated by Dr Charles Dowse (1862–1934), Bishop of Cork, Cloyne and Ross, with assistance from Rev. Archibald de Montfort (1878–1948). The society wedding was attended by her friend, Elizabeth Bowen (1899–1973), whose ancestral home, Bowen's Court, was located nearby at Farahy. Following their marriage, the couple moved to Ballymacmoy House, Killavullen.

== Career ==
Cooke-Collis studied at the Crawford Municipal School of Art under John Power. She subsequently trained with Mainie Jellett through a correspondence course. In 1937, she became a member of the Society of Dublin Painters.

During the 1930s, 40, and 50s, Cooke-Collis exhibited her paintings in solo and group shows at Dublin Painters' Gallery, Grafton Gallery, Irish Exhibition of Living Art, Royal Hibernian Academy, Royal Ulster Academy, and The Water Colour Society of Ireland.

Her work is featured in several Irish public collections, including Crawford Art Gallery, Highlanes Gallery, Limerick City Gallery of Art, The Model, and Waterford Gallery of Art.

== Death ==
Sylvia Cooke-Collis died on 7 February 1973 and is buried alongside her husband at Ballyhooly. Their headstone was carved by the sculptor Séamus Murphy.
