= The Last September (film) =

- DVD cover
- Directed by: Deborah Warner
- Screenplay by: John Banville
- Based on: The Last September by Elizabeth Bowen
- Produced by: Yvonne Thunder
- Starring: Maggie Smith; Michael Gambon; Keeley Hawes; David Tennant; Lambert Wilson
- Cinematography: Slawomir Idziak
- Edited by: Kate Evans
- Music by: Zbigniew Preisner
- Distributed by: Trimark Pictures; UGC DA International
- Release date: 1999
- Running time: 103 minutes
- Countries: France; United Kingdom; Ireland
- Language: English

The Last September is a 1999 British drama film directed by Deborah Warner and produced by Yvonne Thunder from a screenplay by John Banville. It is based on the 1929 novel of the same name by Elizabeth Bowen. The film stars an ensemble cast, which includes Maggie Smith, Michael Gambon, Keeley Hawes, David Tennant and Lambert Wilson. It was filmed in Dowth Hall, County Meath along the banks of the River Boyne.

== Plot ==
Set in the early 1920s, Anglo-Irish landowners Sir Richard and Lady Myra Naylor reside in their country estate with their high-spirited niece, Lois, and their nephew Laurence during the twilight of British rule in southern Ireland. They are joined by the Montmorencys who hide the fact that they are presently homeless. Lois is being courted by a British officer stationed in Ireland during the Irish War of Independence. The arrival of Marda Norton causes an upheaval amongst all in the house as does an escaped commander of the Irish Volunteers who is on the run from local British soldiers and police.

== Cast ==
- Maggie Smith as Lady Myra
- Michael Gambon as Sir Richard Naylor
- Keeley Hawes as Lois Farquar
- David Tennant as Gerald Colthurst
- Lambert Wilson as Hugo Montmorency
- Jane Birkin as Francie Montmorency
- Fiona Shaw as Marda Norton
- Jonathan Slinger as Laurence Carstairs
- Richard Roxburgh as Daventry
- Tom Hickey as O'Brien
- Gary Lydon as Peter Connolly
- Emily Nagle as Livvy Connolly
- Lesley McGuire as Mrs. Vermont

== Reception ==
Writing for The New York Times, A. O. Scott noted Warner's direction "struggles against the arch politesse that too often characterizes the genre. She plunges into the forest with a hand-held camera and shoots her characters through windows, door frames and even the wrong end of a telescope in a heroic effort to trouble the placid surface of their lives, and to make her film resemble something other than an episode of Masterpiece Theater." Movie critic Roger Ebert gave the film two stars and wrote "The weakness of the movie is that these characters are more important as types than as people... The movie is elegantly mounted, and the house is represented in loving detail... I'm not sure the movie should have pumped up the melodrama to get us more interested, but something might have helped. Variety compared it to a "hard-edged 'Masterpiece Theater'". The movie received a score of 42% from 24 reviews on Rotten Tomatoes.
