= The Heat of the Day =

1949 novel by Elizabeth Bowen

- First edition (UK)
- Author: Elizabeth Bowen
- Language: English
- Publisher: Jonathan Cape (UK); Knopf (US)
- Publication date: February 1949
- Media type: Print
- Preceded by: The Death of the Heart (1938)
- Followed by: A World of Love (1955)

The Heat of the Day is a novel by Anglo-Irish Elizabeth Bowen, first published in 1949.

The Heat of the Day revolves around the relationship between Stella Rodney and her lover Robert Kelway, with the interfering presence of Harrison in the tense years following the Blitz in London. Harrison, a British intelligence agent who is convinced that Robert is a German spy, uses this knowledge to get between the two lovers and ultimately neutralise Robert. Stella finds herself caught between spy and counterspy. The narrative reveals the "inextricable knitting together of the individual and the national, the personal and the political."

== Plot ==
The novel opens in the midst of World War II, in a London park where a concert is taking place. Present at the concert are Louie, a young woman whose husband is fighting in the war, and Harrison, an English counterspy. Louie attempts to flirt with Harrison, who sternly rebuffs her. After the concert, Harrison goes to the flat rented by Stella Rodney, a middle-aged woman who works for the government. Harrison is in love with Stella and has been pursuing her for years; Stella is in love with another man, Robert Kelway. Harrison now tells Stella of his suspicions that Robert is a spy for the German government. He promises not to report Robert to the government if she leaves Robert to become his lover.

Stella rejects Harrison's offer but considers the possibilities. Her son, Roderick, visits her on leave from his army training. The novel recounts how Roderick had inherited Mount Morris, the Irish estate owned by his father's cousin Francis. An elderly and wealthy man, Francis had died while visiting his wife, Nettie, at a home for the mentally infirm. It was at Francis's funeral that Stella first met Harrison, who claimed to be a friend of Francis.

Stella continues her relationship with Robert, meeting his eccentric family and holding off Harrison. She eventually leaves for Ireland to visit Mount Morris and take care of affairs for Roderick. Her time there reminds her of her youth, when she had been married to Roderick's father; they were later divorced. Stella resolves to ask Robert about Harrison's allegations. In England, Robert denies the accusations, upbraiding Stella for distrusting him. He then proposes that they get married.

Roderick visits his cousin Nettie to learn whether she wants to return to Mount Morris. Nettie displays a surprisingly sound presence of mind, revealing that she has feigned mental illness to live life on her own terms. She also tells Roderick that, contrary to universal belief, Stella had not initiated her divorce. Roderick's father had begun the proceedings after he fell in love with an army nurse. Roderick confronts his mother with this information, to which she responds that everyone has always assumed she was the guilty party. A phone call from Harrison interrupts the conversation, and Stella accepts his dinner invitation to avoid her son.

At dinner, a startled Stella talks with Harrison about her past. She admits that she lied about her role in the divorce to prevent other people from thinking of her as her husband's fool. Harrison reveals that he knows Stella told Robert about him. He tells her that he now has to arrest Robert. Before Stella can respond, Louie notices Harrison and interrupts their conversation. Stella uses the opportunity to indirectly mock Harrison. She seems to hurt his feelings, and when she implicitly offers to have sex with him to prolong Robert's life, he declines.

Robert gradually becomes aware that the government is converging on him. He goes to Stella to confess his lies. He admits that he spies for Nazi Germany, explaining that freedom provides humanity with nothing but an opportunity to destroy itself. Stella is repelled by his beliefs but she loves him too much to abandon him. Robert tells her that he must leave before they learn to hate each other. He kills himself by throwing himself from the roof of Stella's building.

The narrative gives a sweeping overview of the next two years of the war. Roderick decides never to learn more about his father, instead resolving to live peacefully at Mount Morris. Harrison visits Stella again during another bombing, where she seems to let him down gently. He tells her that his first name is Robert; the resolution of their relationship is left ambiguous. Louie gets pregnant in the course of her extramarital affairs but her husband is killed in action without knowing. Louie leaves London to give birth to her son. She retires with him to her home town, with the intent to raise him as if he were her heroic husband's child.

== Characters ==
=== Main characters ===
Stella Rodney: Stella is the novel's protagonist, an attractive, sophisticated, and independent woman. She is middle-aged, but is also "young-looking—most because of the impression she gave of still being on happy sensuous terms with life." She works for a government agency called XYD, and the sensitive nature of her job leads her to be guarded. She is not inquisitive because she does not want to answer questions herself. Her patriotism is shaped by the fact that her brothers died serving in World War I. Stella has clear class prejudices, being herself descended from (now un-landed) gentry.

Robert Kelway: Robert is an attractive man in his late thirties who remains in London during the war after being wounded at the Battle of Dunkirk. Robert limps from this wound, but only when he feels "like a wounded man." His identity is in constant flux throughout the course of the novel as Stella's investigation of his potential espionage unfolds. Robert's fascist sympathies are due to a combination of his wounding at Dunkirk and his growing up under the rule of his authoritarian mother and the example of his emasculated father.

Harrison: Harrison is a counterspy for England. His eyes are described as being uneven so that he gives the uncanny impression of looking at people with both separate eyes at once, or of looking at them twice. He is a quiet man, and his "emotional idiocy" leads him to making uncomfortable and brash statements through the veiled double-speak of spies and counterspies. He sees "no behavior as being apart from motive, and any motive as worth examining twice." At the end of the novel, he reveals that his first name is Robert.

Roderick Rodney: Roderick is Stella's son. He is a young soldier but is still in England, training, over the course of most of the novel. Roderick becomes a soldier because that is what young men in his time do, rather than out of any particular patriotic fervor. Stella worries that he is too emotionally distant, and indeed he makes no effort to maintain an emotional relationship with any besides his mother with the exception of his friend Fred, a fellow soldier (who we see only briefly on a train platform near the end of the novel), for whom Roderick demonstrates an almost hero-worshipping devotion.

Louie Lewis: Louie is a twenty-seven-year-old working-class woman looking for a model on which to base her life. She is alone in London: her husband, Tom, is away at war and her parents were killed by a bomb in her hometown of Seale-on-Sea. Flirtatious, flighty, and credulous, Louie is constantly seeking human contact as a means to form her own identity.

=== Minor characters ===
Connie: Louie's best friend and an avid and suspicious reader of newspapers

Ernestine Kelway: Robert's loquacious and busy widowed sister

Mrs. Kelway ("Muttikins"): Robert's authoritarian mother

Cousin Nettie: Cousin Francis's widow, who pretends to be mad so that she can live in exile at the madhouse Wisteria Lodge rather than return to her late husband's house

Colonel Pole: one of Stella's estranged ex-in-laws, a mourner at Cousin Francis's funeral.

=== Absent characters ===
Cousin Francis: dead Irishman who bequeathed his ancestral home to Roderick

Fred: Roderick's best friend and fellow soldier (who does appear briefly, described as even taller than Roderick, near the end)

Tom: Louie's husband, off at war through most of the book, dies by the end

Victor: Roderick's father, wounded in World War 1, and then dies, having allegedly left Stella for his nurse

== Character parallelisms ==
=== Stella and Louie ===
Stella and Louie are displaced women in London. Louie is from Seale-on-Sea and only came to London to be with her husband who is now away at war. Stella rents her flats and all her furniture, she has no place to call hers, no permanent home, not even any things (all her furniture etc. is in storage somewhere.)

Both are willing to have sex outside their monogamous relationships for monogamy's sake. Louie carries on her adulterous affairs because she feels closer to her husband with any man than she does with no man. Stella ultimately offers herself sexually to Harrison to try and protect the man she actually loves, Robert.

Both are mothers who lie to their sons about the sons' fathers. In both cases, the mother is making the father look better than he is. However, Louie is also making herself look better by claiming that Thomas Victor's father is her husband, whereas Stella is accepting the blame for adultery that she didn't commit in her lie to her son. Whether or not this makes her look worse is a matter of perspective—yes, she looks guilty, but she rejects the role of a victimised wife (which she really is).

=== Robert and Harrison ===
Both are attracted to Stella, and their simultaneous vying for her person (sexually and psychologically) is central to the plot.

Both are involved in espionage, Robert being a nazi spy and Harrison being a counterspy for England. Furthermore, both are betraying their home country—Robert by spying for Germany, Harrison by trying to buy Stella's sexual favours with his influence as a counterspy.

Harrison has an uneven gaze with his off-balance eyes; Robert has an uneven gait because of his limp.

Both are named Robert.

Neither one has a proper home that we know about, and where they go when they are not with Stella is a mystery. Maud Ellmann argues that this means neither one is a proper "character" by the standards of realism, a deliberate move on Bowen's part.

=== Roderick and Robert ===
Both are men that Stella loves, one as a son and the other as a lover.

They have very similar sounding names—at Cousin Francis's funeral, Colonel Pole accidentally calls Roderick Robert.

Roderick looks "more like himself" in Robert's dressing gown.

Robert believes in fascism because he thinks people can't handle freedom. Roderick eagerly accepts his destiny to be a landowner at Mount Morris, and Stella is relieved that her son has such a script laid out for him rather than being free to be nothing.

=== Cousin Nettie and Robert ===
Both come from houses that affect them negatively: Cousin Nettie from Mount Morris, where generations of Anglo-Irish women went mad or nearly mad, and Robert from Holme Dene, a "man eating house."

Both live duplicitous lives, Robert as a German spy in London and Cousin Nettie as a sane woman who feigns insanity.

Both are trying to establish gender identities by rejecting certain gender roles. Robert is not honouring his fatherland and running a household, but he tells Stella that being a spy in secret makes him a man again, meaning that he is a man, but only in secret. Cousin Nettie tries and fails to be a proper wife to Francis, and only is able to settle down and establish her own domestic space by feigning madness and leaving her married house for good.

== Main themes ==
=== Time ===
Time is essential in the novel and its presence is manifested in a variety of ways. As the general temporal location of events, the present is determined by the eruption of the war in the lives of the characters and is understood, in that context, as a rupture between the past and the future: "vacuum as to future was offset by vacuum as to past."

Time also appears foregrounded in an existential sense, particularly in relation to Stella and Roderick. Stella is constantly conflicted by "the fatal connection between the past and the future having broken before her time. It had been Stella, her generation, who had broken the link". Once he learns he will inherit Mount Morris, Roderick appears often planning, discussing or simply musing over his own future at the house. Finally, the novel closes with a projection into the future after Louie's son is born and the war is over: "the projected English future and the rejected Irish future [are] both figured as pacific in the repeated figure of the three swans."

Finally, time is foregrounded in the materialisation of daily life events. Characters are usually pressed for time in the streets and, particularly for those involved in espionage and plotting activities, every minute is essential. Consequently, we may find several passages in which a number of characters (Stella, Harrison, Louie and Roderick among others) express their reluctance to waste their time or are heard discussing that concept. One should also note that time is meticulously measured during Stella's meetings with Harrison.

=== Identity ===
The novel "works towards an affirmation of the undecidability of identity," which is explored from several angles. Evidently, every character that plays a role as a spy in the novel presents at least a two-sided identity. Additionally, Stella and Louie are painstakingly concerned with their self-image and constantly wonder how others perceive them: the novel "is governed by an almost Berkeleyan metaphysics, in which you are what you are perceived to be." On his part, Roderick changes and becomes more mature and responsible after inheriting Mount Morris. Stella's exploration of Robert's identity, one of the narrative pillars of the plot, remains open until immediately before his death, where he finally unveils his political views and philosophy of life.

=== Freedom ===
Stella's anxiety about her own freedom determines much of her actions and thoughts; coaxed by Harrison to expose Robert, she is trapped in a plot that encroaches upon her freedom whether she decides to give him away or not. Besides, Robert's fascist views on freedom negate the possibility of individual freedom: “'Who could want to be free when they can be strong? Freedom, what a slaves' yammer!... We must have law⎯if necessary let it break us'.”

=== Nation ===
The idea of Britain becomes prominent (usually in connection with the war) mostly when seen from outside the countryside. The characters that do leave the city to go either to Mount Morris, in Ireland, or to Holme Dene, in the Home Counties, think of their country in rather gloomy terms. Except for reports provided by the narration, the consequences of the war upon the country are seen chiefly mainly from the outside too. On the surface, London during the Blitz is not particularly characterised by strong displays of nationalism; instead, life the present is celebrated by the imminence of the possibility of being killed during the bombings. However, the actions of the two main male characters seem to be motivated by their relationship with the nation. While Harrison tries to put an end to Robert's act of treason to the country, the latter despises nationalism and national pride as a reason to fight the war: “'what do you mean? Country?⎯there are no more countries left; nothing but names".

=== Knowing/knowledge ===
The novel poses general questions such as whether or not one can know somebody completely and whether two people can know a third person in exactly the same way, as illustrated by the triangle Stella-Robert-Harrison. Specifically, one of the main tensions in the book lies in the degree of knowledge that each of the male characters may or may not have about the other, using Stella as intermediary: "'If you mean Robert,’ she flashed out, "he doesn’t know you'." As expected, propaganda plays an essential role in the book, as well as the disclosure of the concealed identities of the spies and intelligence agents. On her part, Stella is also concerned by her progressive detachment from her son Roderick and begins wondering if she in fact knows him as she thinks she does.

Roderick is determined throughout the narration to unbury the real story of Victor's adultery, Cousin Francis' actual reason for visiting Britain and Nettie's motivation to check herself in at Wisteria Lodge.

=== Narratives ===
In The Heat of the Day "everyone seems trapped in someone's else's story." Relationships of any type become dependent on language, on what is talked about and how: "The 'story' which Harrison tells Stella about Robert, and then the stories which this novel tells us about what both Stella and Harrison do with that story have their direct public consequences." Indirect language and code are often used, as is to be expected in a novel involving [espionage]. "White information and propaganda", two different forms of telling, are discussed as to the way they are produced and consumed by Louie and Connie. Additionally, the war in London gains a fictitious dimension, seen "as story-telling" and as if "out of a thriller".

Stella becomes especially sensitive towards the way certain events are narrated, such as her divorce. "Bowen makes it very clear that it is not the author of the Heat of the Day who is constructing these two pasts, but Stella herself". She also emphasises that story-telling is the mechanism we have to perceive and remember the past: “'Whoever’s the story had been, I let it be mine. I let it ride, and more⎯it came to be my story, and I stuck to it'.” One of the strongest arguments Robert uses to justify his act of treachery is a critique of public and official discourses: "Don’t you understand all that nation-related language is dead currency?”

=== Place ===
Stella does not settle down in a specific flat, but moves from one to another, which symbolises the fleetingness of her life. Descriptions of her flats often seem be a reflection of her attitude at given moments: before receiving a crucial visit from Harrison, "she had left the street door unlatched and the door of her flat, at the head of the stairs, ajar." Like a good mysterious spy, "Harrison himself has no address."

Houses are described, in contrast to Stella's London flats, as removed and self-contained locations that provide perspective to events happening in London. Holme Dene, Robert's family house in the Home Counties, gives off an aura of mystery and deceit: "though antique in appearance, [it] was not actually old. The oak beams, to be perfectly honest, were imitations." Moreover, it is dominated by a rigid hierarchy headed by Robert's mother: it was "Mrs. Kelway’s house." Finally, in the environment of the "man-eating house" Robert's masculinity is fetishised due to the fact that he is the only son and male family member left alive (except for his young nephew). "Contrasted to Holme Dene is the traditional sanctity and loveliness of Mount Morris" Roderick inherits Mount Morris, a country house in Ireland from which Stella is told about an important advance of the British army: "'Montgomery is through!... It’s the war turning'."

London. The action in the novel is located in London for the most part, which is contrasted by some of the characters' visits to the countryside. Material destruction or detailed descriptions of the urban landscape are generally absent. Nonetheless, Louie, like many other characters, is stuck in the city due to the current events: "She now… never left London, having been left with no place to go."

=== War ===
Even though events occur mainly during World War II, the violence of war is usually absent from the narration: "two years after the Blitz, Londoners, no longer traumatised by nightly raids, were growing acclimatised to ruin." Rather than a period of material destruction, war functions instead as a circumstance that alters normality in people's lives. Stella confesses to Robert: "‘we are friends of circumstance⎯war, this isolation, this atmosphere in which everything goes on and nothing’s said." There are, however, some isolated passages that deal with the bombings of London: "Never had any season been more felt… Out of mists of morning charred by the smoke from ruins each day rose to a height of unmisty glitter; between the last of sunset and first note of the siren the darkening glassy tenseness of evening was drawn fine."

== Motifs ==
=== Clocks, watches and natural time ===
The importance of time and its measure is foregrounded by the presence of clocks in the novel, especially in the actions where Stella is involved: "It was some minutes since she had heard eight strike." Time is also seen as measured by natural processes: "nothing spoke but the clock... the petals detached themselves from a rose in the bowl." There is a particular emphasis on time during the meetings between spies-lovers: "even her wrist watch seemed to belie time," "their two wristwatches… never perfectly synchronising." Also, time in the isolated Holme Dene seems to work in a unique way: "the grandfather clock, on the other hand, must have stood there always⎯time had clogged its ticking."

=== Photographs ===
In Stella's flats, photographs emphasise the importance of the past and the problematic of representation. We are told that there "were two photographs, not framed yet⎯the younger of the two men was Roderick, Stella’s twenty-year-old son." Photographs of Robert in Holme Dene seem to contribute to the construction of Robert's identity: "sixty or seventy photographs, upward from snapshots to crowded groups, had been passepartouted or framed… All of the photographs featured Robert."

=== Windows and mirrors ===
By making Stella look through windows and into mirrors, the author highlights the importance of perceiving the environment, most importantly during scenes involving plotting and espionage: "Over the photographs, hung a mirror⎯into which, on hearing Harrison’s footstep actually on the stairs, she looked; not at herself but with the idea of studying, at just one more remove from reality, the door of this room opening behind her." Her looking through windows dramatises the isolation and partial safety in which the citizens lived through the Blitz at their homes, and it also symbolises the tensions between her self-image and how she may be regarded from the outside.

Mirrors also underscore Stella's concerns about her own appearance and her identity as perceived by others: "She carried the lamp to meet one of its own reflections in a mirror, and, lifting it, studied the romantic face that was still hers."

=== Newspapers ===
Newspapers are the main vehicle for information and propaganda dissemination. Additionally, the novel problematises the way they may determine people's perception of the war: "Bowen’s point is that these two ways of reacting to newspapers are fundamentally similar: one brashly independent-minded, the other fragilely seeking for a sense of self, but both caught up in the war as story." In particular, Louie is seen to be profoundly affected by the discourse of newspapers: she "now felt badly about any part of herself which in any way did not fit into the papers' picture... [she] came to love newspapers physically."

== TV adaptation ==
Harold Pinter wrote a television film based on the novel directed by Christopher Morahan in 1989, starring Patricia Hodge as Stella, Michael York as Robert and Michael Gambon as Harrison.

== Sources ==
- Bennett, Andrew and Royle, Nicholas. Elizabeth Bowen and the Dissolution of the Novel: Still Lives. New York: Palgrave Macmillan, 1995. ISBN 0-312-12048-6
- Bowen, Elizabeth. The Heat of the Day, First Anchor Books 2002 edition. ISBN 0-89966-259-5
- Corcoran, Neil. "War’s Stories: The Heat of the Day and its Contexts." Elizabeth Bowen: The Enforced Return. Oxford: Oxford University Press, 2003. ISBN 0-19-818690-8
- Ellmann, Maud. Elizabeth Bowen, A Shadow Across the Page. Edinburgh: Edinburgh University Press, 2003. ISBN 978-0-7486-1703-6
- Piette, Adam. Imagination at War: British Fiction and Poetry, 1939–1945. London: Papermac, 1995. ISBN 978-0-19-818690-8
