= The Last September =

1929 novel by Elizabeth Bowen

- First edition cover
- Author: Elizabeth Bowen
- Language: English
- Genre: novel
- Set in: County Cork, 1920
- Publisher: Constable & Co.
- Publication date: 1929
- Publication place: London, United Kingdom
- Media type: Print: octavo (hardback & paperback)
- Pages: 312
- OCLC: 558227437
- Dewey Decimal: 823.912
- LC Class: PR6003 .O6757
- Preceded by: The Hotel (1927)
- Followed by: Friends and Relations (1931)

The Last September is a 1929 novel by the Anglo-Irish writer Elizabeth Bowen, concerning life in Danielstown, County Cork during the Irish War of Independence, at a country mansion. John Banville wrote a screenplay based on the novel; the film adaptation was released in 1999.

== Plot ==
Preface

Although The Last September was first published in 1929, a preface was written for this text decades later to be included in the second American edition of this novel. Concerned that readers unfamiliar with this particular chapter of Irish history would not fully comprehend the anxieties of these times, Bowen takes great pains to explain the particulars of both her writing process and the political reasons for the unsettled atmosphere felt throughout the text, palpable even in its most seemingly serene moments. Of all her books, Bowen notes, The Last September is "nearest to my heart, [and it] had a deep, unclouded, spontaneous source. Though not poetic, it brims up with what could be the stuff of poetry, the sensations of youth. It is a work of instinct rather than knowledge—to a degree, a 'recall' book, but there had been no such recall before." While Bowen's own beloved family home, Bowen's Court, remained untouched throughout "The Troubled Times" this preface explores the ramifications for witnesses of “Ambushes, arrests, captures and burning, reprisals and counter-reprisals” as "The British patrolled and hunted; the Irish planned, lay in wait, and struck.” "I was the child of the house from which Danielstown derives" Bowen concludes, "nevertheless, so often in my mind's eye did I see it [Bowen’s Court] burning that the terrible last event in The Last September is more real than anything I have lived through."

Part One
The Arrival of Mr. & Mrs. Montmorency

The Last September opens in “a moment of happiness, of perfection” as Sir Richard and Lady Naylor welcome their long-awaited guests, Hugo and Francie Montmorency, to their country estate, Danielstown, in County Cork, Ireland. Despite—or, in some characters’ cases, in spite of—the tensions produced by what Bowen obliquely refers to as "The Troubled Times", the Montmorencys, the Naylors, as well as the Naylors' niece, Lois, and nephew, Laurence, attempt to live their lives in the aftermath of The Great War while coping with the occasionally conflicting dictates of their class's expectations and personal desires. Preoccupied with the concerns of social obligations which must be met even as they are enacted against a backdrop of uncertainty and national unrest, the residents of Danielstown occupy themselves with tennis parties, visits, and dances, often including the wives and officers of the British Army who have been assigned to this region. The people of Danielstown all share a particular interest in the shifting relationship between Lois and a young British officer, Gerald Lesworth, as Lois struggles to determine precisely who she is and what it is she wants out of life.

Part Two
The Visit of Miss Norton

Lois's confusion regarding her future and the state of the bond she shares with Gerald is temporarily sidelined by the arrival of yet another visitor to Danielstown, a Miss Marda Norton whose connection to the Naylor family remains strong even in the face of perpetual inconvenience and Lady Naylor's long-standing polite aversion to the younger woman. Marda's presence is, however, as much of a blessing for Lois and Laurence as it is an annoyance for Lady Naylor and Hugo Montmorency—the latter having developed a one-sided fixation on the soon-to-be-married Marda.

While Lois and Marda's friendship deepens, readers are also made aware of escalating violence as the fragile status quo established between the British Army, the Black and Tans, and local Irish resistance is threatened by Gerald's capture of Peter Connor, the son of an Irish family friendly with the Naylors. Unbeknownst to the residents of Danielstown (with the single exception of Hugo), Lois and Marda's acquaintance with Ireland's national turmoil is expanded firsthand as they are confronted by an unknown individual while on an afternoon stroll through the countryside of County Cork. Although permitted to depart with only a trifling wound to Marda's hand and Lois's promise that they will never speak of this encounter in the ruins of the old mill, this meeting and Marda's subsequent return to England signal a shift as the novel's characters’ attention return to the various topics occupying their thoughts before her arrival.

Part Three
The Departure of Gerald

After Marda Norton's departure, Lois's attention is once again firmly fixed upon both Gerald and the activities organised by the British officers’ wives. But despite Lois's determination to finally come to a firm conclusion regarding her future, her relationship with Gerald is first delayed by Lady Naylor's machinations and then left forever unresolved by Gerald's death—which may have been at the hands of Peter Connor's friends. Not long after Gerald's death Laurence, Lois, and the Montmorencys leave Sir Richard and Lady Naylor, but the Naylors have little time to enjoy their solitude at Danielstown. The Naylor family estate and the other great houses are put to the torch the following February—likely by the same men who organised the attack on Gerald—their destruction reinforcing the fact the lifestyle once enjoyed by the landed Anglo-Irish gentry has been brought to an end.

== Characters ==
=== Major characters ===
- Sir Richard Naylor is the family patriarch and the master of Danielstown, Sir Richard is very much aware of the immediacy of the Troubles even though he rarely voices these concerns out loud. Instead, Bowen's readers are the persons most often made privy to his uncertainty regarding the immediacy of the escalating conflict taking place on and around his family's land.
- Myra, Lady Naylor is a decisive woman who refuses to acknowledge even the possibility of changing standards in the post-war era, Lady Naylor's mind and views are entrenched in the views held by the most conservative members of her socio-economic class—especially in regard to judging the marital prospects of her friends, relations, and acquaintances.
- Lois Farquar is the only child of Sir Richard's sister Laura, eighteen-year-old Lois is extremely indecisive as she continually ponders her identity as a young woman in the post-war era and her relationship with Gerald Lesworth. As she attempts to find answers to these questions Lois also serves as the readers’ primary witness to the events unfolding within the text.
- Laurence is Lois's cousin who is visiting with his Aunt Myra and Uncle Richard in County Cork. A reluctant participant in his Aunt Myra's social affairs and a bit of a misanthrope, Laurence makes it quite clear that he would prefer to be anywhere but Danielstown, but also lacks the funds that would make his preference feasible.
- Hugo Montmorency is a friend of the Naylors who has finally returned to Danielstown. It has been twelve years since his last visit. Formerly in love with Laura Naylor Farquar, Hugo is not entirely certain how to view Lois Farquar, Laura's daughter.
- Frances Montmorency is a quiet woman who is very much aware of the deep undercurrents throughout the Danielstown household. Although she is often viewed as an invalid by family and friends, there is nothing wrong with Francie's mind and Bowen makes it very clear that Francie's position as an eternal spectator permits her to see more than her companions know.
- Gerald Lesworth is a British subaltern from Surrey, Gerald is attracted to Lois but not entirely confident about the direction (and detours) their relationship seems to be taking. The quintessential example of British manhood, Gerald is often uncomfortable with the Anglo-Irish view of the British Empire.
- Marda Norton is a friend and visitor of the Naylor family who is loved by Lois, admired by Hugo, and cordially despised by Lady Naylor. Marda is not-quite-secretly engaged to Leslie Lawe, a stockbroker, and this revelation is rather surprising news for all the residents of Danielstown.

=== Minor characters ===
- Livvy Thompson is Lois's friend, a young lady who delights in taking charge, fiancée of
- David Armstrong is a soldier attached to the British regiment
- Laura Naylor Farquar is the sister of Richard, mother of Lois, and former sweetheart of Hugo Montmorency, Laura died when Lois was very young. Nevertheless, she is often in the thoughts of both Lois and Hugo.
- Mrs. Vermont is an English social butterfly whose primary interest is socialising, wife of
- Captain Vermont is a British officer
- The Hartigans is a neighbouring Anglo-Irish family possessing five unmarried daughters
- Daventry is a shell shocked British soldier who is nevertheless attached to the Intelligence division
- Smith is a British soldier, but such a minor character he is not even permitted a first name
- Viola is Lois's friend, penpal, and occasional confidant
- Mrs. Fogarty is one of the novel's few Irish Roman Catholics in favour of maintaining close ties with Britain.
- The Connors are a Roman Catholic Irish family who is nominally friendly with the Naylors
- Peter Connor is the Connor son captured by Gerald and his men. Although Peter is never actually physically present within the scenes of the novel, he and his political associates have a tremendous effect upon the residents of Danielstown as well as Danielstown itself.

== Themes ==
=== Sterility ===
The sterility theme permeates the novel in characters and environment. The absence of children is conspicuous as if "children seem in every sense of the word to be inconceivable" with the exception of Hercules, who is the youngest in his family and the only boy with four girls. The Naylors and the Montmorencys do not have children. The Hartigan girls are spinsters, "There are certainly a great many unmarried women." Lois has a feeling of being barren when she is looked at, "a glance from Mr. Montmorency or Laurence would make her encounter sterile.” She seems to have feelings for both Hugo Montmorency and Gerald Lesworth. But later in the novel, she stops her affectionate feelings towards Hugo and cannot determine what she should feel about Gerald. Marda Norton remembers a story that causes her to "go dry inside to think of it now.” This human sterility extends to or emerges from the place itself i.e. Ireland: "Talking of being virginal, do you ever notice this country? Doesn’t sex seem irrelevant?” Sir Richard knows that his plantation is almost crushed and he does not want any further damage to happen to it by bringing the soldiers to look if there are buried guns in his plantation: “And why would we want to know? You’ll have the place full of soldiers, trampling the young trees. There’s been enough damage in the plantation with the people coming to sightsee…"

=== The big house ===
Danielstown is a very spacious place where most of the incidents in the novel take place. It seems to have unique characteristics and a haunting effect on its inhabitants and visitors. In Elizabeth Bowen: The Shadow Across the Page, Maud Ellmann suggests that architecture in Bowen's writings is inseparable from characters: "In her writing, architecture takes the place of psychology: character is shaped by rooms and corridors, doors and windows, arches and columns, rather than by individual experience." Lois approaches the house from a distance in the end of the first section of the novel ruminating over the scenery and she feels that the house is interacting with her:

To the south, below them, the demesne trees of Danielstown made a dark formal square like a rug on the green country. In their heart like a dropped pin the grey glazed roof reflecting the sky lightly glinted. Looking down, it seemed to Lois they lived in the forest; space of lawns blotted out in the pressure and dusk of tree. She wondered still more that they were not afraid. Far from here too, their isolation became apparent. The house seemed to be pressing down low in apprehension, hiding its face, as though it had her vision of where it was. It seemed to huddle its trees close in fright and amazement at the wide light lovely unloving country, the unwilling bosom whereon it was set.

Laurence calls it "a dreadful house." The looking-glasses of the house make Gerald sleepy. Marda Norton loses her bags and believes the reason is the place: "I don't lose things except coming here; I am efficient really. But there seems a kind of fatality…" When the Montmorencys arrive at Danielstown, the house seems to protest but silently: "Two storeys up, she [Lois] could have heard a curtain rustle, but the mansion piled itself up in silence over the Montmorencys' voices." The movie was filmed in Dowth Hall, County Meath in the late 1990s, along the riverbanks of the River Boyne.

=== Oriental/colonial presence ===
The exotic is presented to us in the Anglo-Irish society in the first chapter: "Going through to her room at nights Lois often tripped with her toe in the jaws of a tiger….There were two locked bookcases of which the keys had been lost, and a troop of ebony elephants brought back from India by someone she did not remember paraded along the tops of the bookcases." There are also a number of instances where antiques from the Orient are part of the furniture of Danielstown. Gerald also is described as "Bedouin" by Betty Vermont: "This was not a thing she could have said to every man, because really the East had become so very suggestive. But he was the dearest boy, so absolutely nice-minded." There is an insinuation that the East carries sexual connotations but Gerald is "nice-minded" and he will not be offended by this association with the East. The colonial project is embodied in Gerald. When Laurence asks him about the meaning of civilisation, he believes that the British Empire is very capable of delivering civilisation to people: "I mean, looking back in history – not that I'm intellectual – we do seem the only people." Maud Ellmann points out: "The British soldier Gerald Lesworth is naïve enough to think that the good guys can be firmly distinguished from the bad guys. If war were openly declared, he blusters, we could clean these beggars out in a week". In addition, the colonisation is viewed as a career. Gerald criticises Mr. Armstrong because he is not "keener on his career".

=== Frozen youth ===
The narrative insists on framing the temporal element of the novel within a fixed period of time, "In those days…" and "cancelled time". In Elizabeth Bowen and the Dissolution of the Novel, Andrew Bennett and Nicholas Royle believe that this style of stasis and abeyance in the narrative is characteristic of Bowen since the opening scene of her first novel The Hotel:

Bowen’s novels are always already finished, stilled, from and by the opening of her first novel. Bowen’s novels are still lives. Any reading which can occur beyond this opening is a supplementary reading of the impossible mobilities contained within, but not by, the thought of catatonia. Bowen’s ten novels will be haunted by this opening, by the paradox of a catatonic thought-stoppage, and by the paradox that the novels are already finished, stilled by such a thought.

"In those days" and "cancelled time", Lois, the heroine, believes that she lives in a cocoon: "I might as well be in some kind of cocoon." This frozen, "intransitive" and nebulous imagery is linked with Lois throughout the novel: "She was lonely, and saw there was no future. She shut her eyes and tried – as sometimes when she was seasick, locked in misery between Holyhead and Kingstown – to be enclosed in nonentity, in some ideal no-place perfect and clear as a bubble."

=== National identity ===
The Anglo-Irish society seems nonplussed with its loyalty. It is not determined whether to be loyal to Ireland or England. This seems to be the source of its dilemma. The ultimate example is presented in Lois locked between Holyhead [Wales] and Kingstown [Ireland] in "nonentity", belonging to neither place. Ellmann elucidates:

The trouble in this country is the other plot, most of which transpires behind the scenes, while the love plot dominates the stage. Yet both are stories of paralysis: Lois Farquar, the central character, fails to fall in love with any of the men available, just as the Naylors fail to take sides in the struggle that decides their fate. Both plots conclude in disengagement, romantic in the one case, political in the other.

In Elizabeth Bowen: A Reputation in Writing, Renee C. Hoogland expounds how the relationship between the Irish and the Anglo-Irish is doomed:

The sense of dislocation Laurence and Lois have in common is placed at the center of the narrative by being reflected in the novel's sociohistorical setting, metaphorically foregrounded by the violence of the Troubles. Indicative of the gulf dividing the Anglo-Irish from the native Irish, this war will eventually lead to the destruction of the colonizing power of the Anglo-Irish landed gentry, of the Ascendency itself, and of the way of life it still barely upholds. Founded on unequal power relations embedded in an outdated class system, the Anglo-Irish community is shown to have rendered itself virtually obsolete. This in turn is intimated by Lois's and Laurence's relative indifference to the threat of the political upheavals. As the drawn-out ending of a story in which they feel they have no part, the war yet keeps them in thrall and thwarts them in their search for the meanings of their own "historical present".

=== Satire/comedy ===
Some critics like Renee C. Hoogland and Neil Corcoran believe that the novel carries satirical and comic elements that target the Anglo-Irish and English society. Hoogland states: "In traditional generic terms, The Last September can be classified as a social comedy that satirizes the manners and the morals of the Anglo-Irish landed gentry and the English upper-middle classes." Hoogland also points Myra Naylor's class “arrogance and bigoted nationalist views allow Bowen to display her exquisite talent for social satire. The main target of the Irish lady's scorn are the English upper-middle classes:

I always find the great thing in England is to have plenty to say, and mercifully they are determined to find one amusing. But if one stops talking, they tell one the most extraordinary things, about their husbands, their money affairs, their insides. They don’t seem discouraged by not being asked. And they seem so intimate with each other; I suppose it comes from living so close together. Of course they are very definite and practical, but it is a pity they talk so much about what they are doing. I can’t think why they think it should matter.

In Elizabeth Bowen: The Enforced Return, Corcoran explains the comic depiction of the Anglo-Irish society:

Constantly playing against the brightness of social comedy in The Last September, therefore – notably the comedy of edgy insinuation and misunderstanding that characterizes Anglo-Irish/English/Irish relations – is a pervasive effect of attenuation, bathos, desuetude. ‘They were delayed, deflected,’ it is said of Hugo’s and Marda’s lengthy failure to pay a return visit to Danielstown; but, in fact, this could be said more generally of the Anglo-Irish in the novel too.

Corcoran also thinks that "...The Last September maintains throughout the parity, if not the primacy, of its comic tone. Inventing the marriage of Hugo and Laura, for instance, the fastidious Laurence also, with a shudder, envisages a time when they and four sons 'all hurried out to coarsen in Canada'; on the wedding morning, he thinks, 'the four young sons jiggled in excitement among the cherubim.'"

=== Feminism ===
Hoogland reads Lois's character in an intriguing feminist context. She believes that Lois fails to fall in love completely with Gerald because she sees the futility of marriage around her:

By adopting their prescribed role in the social contract, Lois’s friends [Livvy and Viola] not only conform to but in effect reinforce the regimes of compulsory heterosexuality and phallogocentrism subtending it. Despite her need to be recognized, to "be in a pattern", our heroine is incapable of such a wholehearted embrace of her assigned place within the established power/knowledge system. Sensing the aridity of marriages around her, Lois astutely discerns the limitations imposed on the individual spouses by the institution of heterosexuality itself. Wanting no part of that, she can alleviate her fear of being "locked out" by the elder generation by deriving a "feeling of mysteriousness and destination" from the thought she will "penetrate thirty years deeper ahead into Time than they could". She cannot so easily afford to distance herself from her peers, however. Succeeding the now "lost" leading elders, Viola and Livvy are the others on which Lois depends for confirmation of her precarious sense of self. Her conscious reservation notwithstanding, she feels compelled to follow them in trying to be a "pleasant young person", which, she has learned, entails being "attractive to a number of young men". She therefore hesitatingly accepts Gerald Lesworth's persistent attentions.

Lady Naylor insists that "these early marriages ruin careers, and engagements are nearly as bad". She also believes: "There's a future for girls nowadays outside marriage…Careers –." Despite her intentions in dissuading Lois from marrying Gerald, there is a message of women's empowerment not to adhere to "the institution of heterosexuality", if we use Hoogland's phrase cited above.

== Motifs ==
=== Ellipsis ===
The ultimate example of ellipsis of the novel is the mill scene in which Marda Norton is shot. Corcoran explains the function and effect of ellipsis in the novel:

The ruined mill is, as it were, the terrible secret of Anglo-Irish history still architecturally articulate on the land, even in its desolation; and Hugo begins to elaborate something like this before he is prevented by yet one more elision: "'Another', Hugo declared, 'of our national grievances. English law strangled the –' But Lois insisted on hurrying: she and Marda were now well ahead." That ellipsis is the gap through which along Anglo-Irish history falls: the issue is raised, as so often in Bowen, only to be turned from, but in a way that makes it in some ways all the more insistent, with the insistence of the hauntingly irretrievable.

Maud Ellmann also illustrates: "The narrative also cocoons itself, in the sense that most events occur offstage, as in Greek tragedy." A number of the conversations in the novel are full of pauses, unfinished sentences or awkward silence. The conversation that takes place between Gerald and Laurence about civilisation and its meaning epitomises how the meaning happens in interruptions and pauses which are not actual words. Just like Ellmann's analogy of the Greek tragedy where action takes place outside stage, the meaning in The Last September happens in ellipsis.

=== The burning of Danielstown ===
The novel ends with the conflagration of Danielstown. But readers are not surprised by this eventful incendiary as the narrative foreshadows this ineluctable ending. Laurence predicts the burning of Danielstown: "But I should like something else to happen, some crude intrusion of the actual. I feel all gassy inside from yawning. I should like to be here when this house burns." The Montmorencys are contemplating building a bungalow but Lady Naylor rebuffs this idea: "Don't be silly – Besides, according to that friend of the Trents, it would be blown up or burnt in a month or two." This ending refers to the IRA practice of destroying country houses in Ireland between 1919 and 1923.

== Film adaptation ==
A film version was released in 1999. John Banville wrote the screenplay, from which Yvonne Thunder produced and Deborah Warner directed. Zbigniew Preisner provided the music and Slawomir Idziak provided the cinematography.

The film stars Maggie Smith, Michael Gambon, Keeley Hawes, David Tennant, Lambert Wilson, Jane Birkin, and Fiona Shaw.

== Sources ==
- Bennett, Andrew and Nicholas Royale: Elizabeth Bowen and the Dissolution of the Novel. New York: St. Martin's Press, 1995. ISBN 0-312-12048-6
- Bowen, Elizabeth. The Last September. 1929. New York: Anchor Books, 2000. ISBN 978-0-385-72014-4
- ---. “Preface to The Last September.” Seven Winters: Memories of a Dublin Childhood & Afterthoughts: Pieces on Writing. New York: Knopf, 1962.
- Corcoran, Neil: Elizabeth Bowen: the Enforced Return. Oxford, Clarendon Press, 2004. ISBN 0-19-818690-8
- Ellmann, Maud: Elizabeth Bowen: The Shadow Across the Page. Edinburgh: Edinburgh UP, 2003. ISBN 978-0-7486-1703-6
- Hoogland, Renee C.: Elizabeth Bowen: A Reputation in Writing. New York: New York UP, 1994. ISBN 0-8147-3511-8
- Williams, Julia McElhattan. “‘Fiction with the Texture of History’: Elizabeth Bowen's The Last September.” MFS Modern Fiction Studies 41.2 (1995): 219–242.
