= Kim Brandstrup =

Danish-born, British-based choreographer (born 1957)

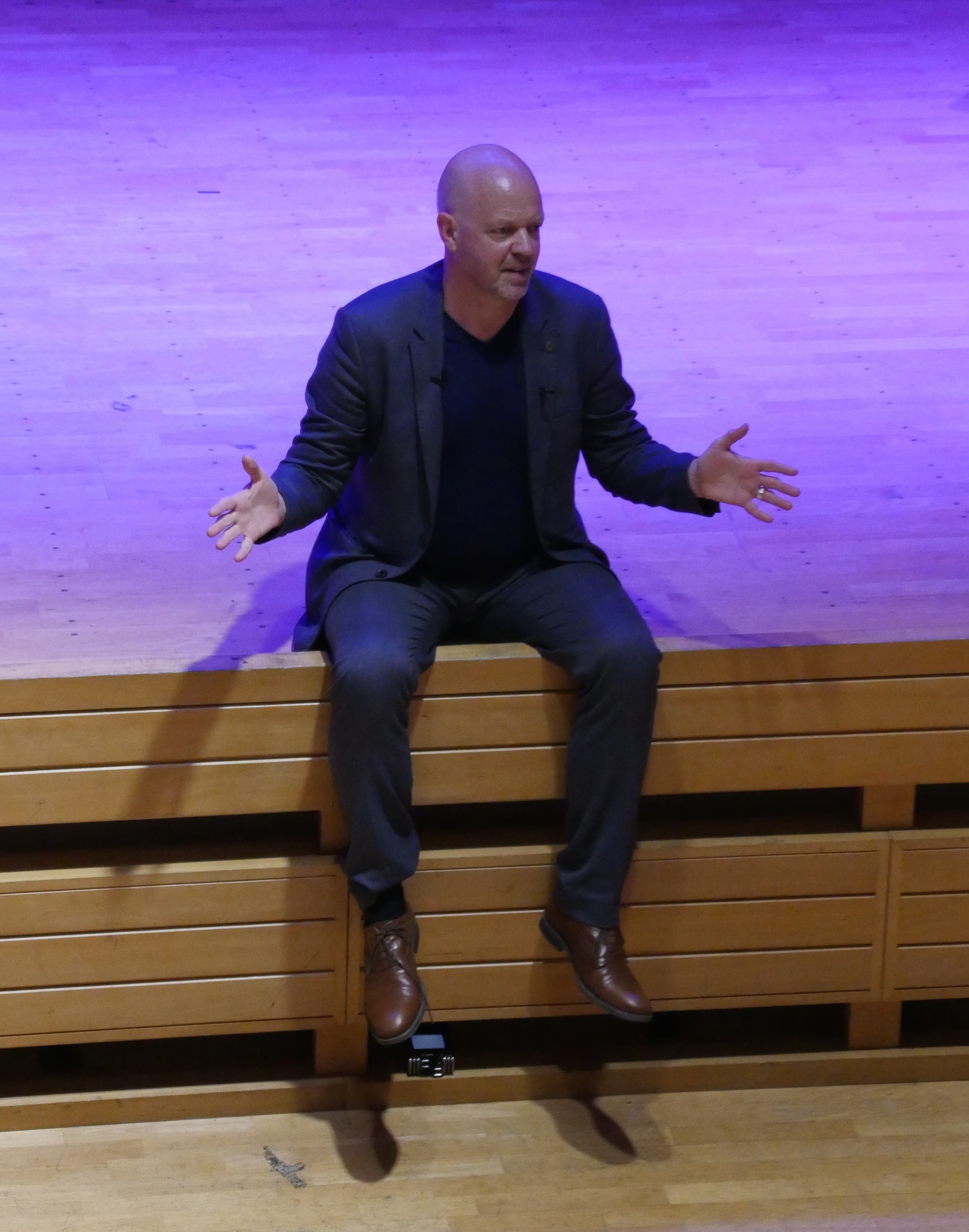
Kim Brandstrup

Kim Brandstrup (born 9 January 1957) is a Danish-born, British-based choreographer. He received a degree from the University of Copenhagen in Film and Media Studies and the London Contemporary Dance School where he studied choreography with Nina Fonaroff. He began working as a choreographer in 1983, and in 1985 founded his own dance company, Arc Dance Company. He has worked with a number of companies including New York City Ballet, The Royal Ballet, The Royal Danish Ballet, English National Ballet, and the Rambert Dance Company among others - as well as extensive work in theatre, opera and film, drawing on his cinematic training to forge his unique narrative style.

Over the last two and a half decades, Brandstrup has established his name as one of the leading narrative choreographers of his generation, a dance maker with a natural instinct for telling stories. For Brandstrup telling stories and addressing serious subjects has always been combined - “telling stories connects us” as he has once said “to our shared humanity”. When he decided to switch his studies to dance, at the late age of 19, what motivated him was the belief that this new art form offered him a language with an even greater immediacy and universality than film.

== Early career ==
In 1980, Brandstrup left his native Denmark to study at the London Contemporary Dance School, and it was in London that he founded his own company, Arc Dance Company in 1985. From the start of his career his commitment to narrative was unmistakable with works based on Othello and Hamlet, the myth of Orpheus, even the novels of Dostoyevsky. Works for Arc includes Les Noces (1983), The Dybbuk (1988), Peer Gynt (1990), Othello (1993), Saints and Shadows (1994), Crime Fictions(1996), Elegy (2001), Hamlet (2003) and Anatomy of the Storyteller (2006).

== Ballet works (2005-2015) ==
Over the years, too, Brandstrup has developed an increasingly rich and supple language of expression. Early on in his career his choreography was rooted in the solid, weighted language of modern dance. Musically he preferred the strong, rhythmic propulsion of early baroque or 20th century minimalism. But as Brandstrup began working with ballet-trained dancers he started to absorb some of their movement vocabulary, along with their qualities of lyricism, lightness and speed. He also began to widen his range of scores, attracted increasingly to the subtleties of melody and phrasing within the 19th and early 20th century classical repertories. In performance this merging of traditions appears fluent, almost seamless, perhaps because the choreography remains so focussed on its expressive motivation. In Brandstrup's mature work we see through the dancing to the music and the scenarios that inspire it.

Another hallmark of Brandstrup's mature style is the way it reflects his creative relationships within the studio. Brandstrup develops his material in close collaboration with his dancers, not only working with their particular strengths and characteristics, but also giving them some freedom in the way they phrase the choreography. There is nothing improvised in Brandstrup's work but there is, he says, “a nice possibility of misinterpretation, of the dancers doing something I didn't expect. It's the feeling with which they attack movement that makes it expressive or narrative. The shape of the body is not expressive - it is how you move, it's how you get there, how you mould the journey, that matters.”

== The Royal Ballet ==
Brandstrup's association with The Royal Ballet began in 2005 when he was invited to contribute a work for the Ashton centenary season. The resulting Two Footnotes to Ashton, a duet for Alina Cojacaru and Johan Kobborg and a solo for Zenaida Yanovsky. However, for Rushes, commissioned by The Royal Ballet in 2008 and revived in 2010). Arguably this work pulls together many of the strands of his long career. For his literary source Brandstrup has again turned to Dostoyevsky, using the author's preliminary character studies for the 1868 novel, The Idiot in order to weave together a series of obliquely stated relationships and dramatic themes. The influence of cinema remains equally strong, not only in the title (which refers to the raw, unedited scenes screened after each day's filming) but also in Brandstrup's choice of music, composed by Prokofiev for a film version of The Queen of Spades.

Goldberg: The Brandstrup-Rojo Project, which he created in September 2009 with Royal Ballet Principal Tamara Rojo, and which won a Laurence Olivier Award for the 'Best Dance Production of 2009'. Described variously by critics as ‘a mini-masterpiece’ and ‘a choreographic gem’, Goldberg was commissioned by ROH2 and staged at the Linbury Theatre of the Royal Opera House. Invitus Invitam (2010) for Leanne Benjamin and Ed Watson was based on Racine's play, Berenice; music by Couperin orchestrated by Thomas Ades. Machina Metamorphosis: Titian 2012, created in collaboration with Wayne McGregor, and Ceremony of Innocence (2013) was part of the Benjamin Britten Centenary. He also created the dance film Leda and the Swan – starring Zenaida Yanowsky, Swedish dancer Tommy Franzen and actor Fiona Shaw – for Deloitte Ignite 14.

== Recent work (2015-2016) ==
His most recent work includes : a new version of Debussy's Jeux for New York City Ballet, premiered in October 2015. And Verklaerte Nacht for Rambert Dance Company premiered at Sadlers Wells on 2 November 2015. Currently working on a full-length ballet for Royal Danish Ballet, Rystet Spejl (Shaken Mirror) set to the poetry of the Danish poet Søren Ulrik Thomsen with music by Hans Abrahamsen. Premier on the 28 May at Skuespilhuset in Copenhagen.

== Other collaborators and collaborations ==
He has over the years established a strong link with The Royal Danish Ballet creating Mysterier (1993), the full length ballet Cupid and Psyche (1997), Ghosts in 2007 and most recently Eidolon (2011). His career as a freelance choreographer has also been prolific. Alongside the many dance companies who have performed his repertory (including London Contemporary Dance Theatre, English National Ballet, Royal New Zealand Ballet, Rambert Dance Company, Norwegian Ballet, and Birmingham Royal Ballet).

Brandstrup has worked extensively in opera at the Royal Opera House Covent Garden, The Met, La Scala, La Monnaie. In 2006, he collaborated with Phylida Lloyd on a dance/opera staging of Edgar Allan Poe's The Fall of the House of Usher, commissioned by the Bregenz Festival. The following year he worked with Deborah Warner and the English National Opera, choreographing the Games of Apollo section for Benjamin Britten's Death in Venice, as well as staging for the dance theatre classic Seven Deadly Sins for the Greek National Opera & Ballet in Athens. Further collaborations with Deborah Warner includes Messiah, La Traviata, Eugene Onegin and Between Worlds.

== Interviews ==
- Louise Levene: Interview: Choreographer Kim Brandstrup, Financial Times, October 24, 2015, p. 14
- NY Times Article
- Playbillarts.com
- BBC Article
- The Guardian : Facing the music: Kim Brandstrup (26 October 2015)
