= Roger Harold Metford Warner =

British antiques dealer and collector (1913-2008)

Roger Harold Metford Warner (3 May 1913 – 13 May 2008) was an antiques dealer and collector in Burford, Oxfordshire.

== Early life ==
Roger Harold Metford Warner was born in Settle, then in the West Riding of Yorkshire, the son of Harold Metford Warner and Marjorie Barrett Sowerby. His engineer father died before Warner was born. One of his grandfathers, Metford Warner, owned Jeffrey and Company the wallpaper manufacturers who printed William Morris papers. He was educated at Leighton Park School.

== Career ==
In 1936 Warner founded Roger Warner Antique Dealers in Burford, Oxfordshire, with the help of his mother, Marjorie. He was particularly keen on buying stock that was of little interest to other dealers. This included pieces of vernacular furniture used in servants' rooms and country house offices, and obsolete agricultural tools. Many of these items came on to the market as part of the sale and demolition of country houses common just before and after the Second World War. Warner also developed a knowledge of textiles, his interest in fabrics encompassed worsteds and chintzes.

During the Second World War Warner closed his shop. In 1946 he joined a Quaker Relief Team in Holland as their leader helping to rehabilitate Dutch citizens after the Nazi occupation. Warner reopened the shop in 1947 and Lawrence Darton, the book historian, joined the business. However, Warner's antiquarian book dealing was short lived as he decided that books took too long to handle.

As a leading figure in the antiques world, Warner sold to multiple prominent museums including the Victoria and Albert Museum, Temple Newsam in Leeds and the Ashmolean Museum in Oxford. He also had many private clients who included Peter Ustinov, Bruce Chatwin and members of the British royal family such as Princess Margaret. Another high-profile customer was Charles Paget Wade of Snowshill Manor. Many items to be seen in the house today were bought from Roger Warner Antique Dealers.

Warner often appeared on the antiques quiz show 'Going for a Song' on the BBC in the 1960s and 1970s, along with fellow antiques expert Arthur Negus. In 1985 after nearly 50 years in business, Warner retired. The Regional Furniture Society published his autobiography 'Roger Warner, Memoirs of a Twentieth Century Antique Dealer' as their journal in 2003.

After his death at the age of 98 in 2008 his extensive antique collection was sold, with much press coverage, over four days at Christie's South Kensington and Brightwells in Leominster, grossing over £2,000,000.

== Personal life ==
Warner married Ruth Ernestine Hurcombe, the South African botanist in 1949. They had a son and two daughters. One daughter is the British director of theatre and opera Deborah Warner. Warner was a Quaker and, during the Second World War, a conscientious objector.
