= Eva Trout (novel) =

Novel by Elizabeth Bowen

- First edition (publ. Knopf)
- Author: Elizabeth Bowen
- Language: English
- Publisher: Knopf
- Publication date: 1968
- LC Class: PR6003.O6757 .E9

Eva Trout is a 1968 novel by Elizabeth Bowen. It is her final novel and was shortlisted for the 1970 Booker Prize. The story concerns a young woman—the eponymous heroine—who, abandoned by her mother just after her birth, raised by nurses and nannies and educated by governesses all hired by her millionaire father, has difficulty acting and behaving like an adult when, shortly after her father's suicide, she inherits all his money.

== Plot summary ==
Part I-Genesis

The novel opens with Eva's excursion to a lake in the neighbourhood of Larkins where she is staying as a paying guest since her father's death. The lady of Larkins, Iseult Arble, is a former teacher of Eva's whom Eva is very fond of during the school days. However, Eva does not presently fancy the Arbles' guardianship and often travels to the Danceys' house where she can enjoy the company of Catrina, Henry, Andrew and Louise Dancey.

In the first section, readers get to know the two schools Eva went to as a young girl. The first school, owned by her father Willy Trout and administered by Constantine's lover Kenneth, is one of the rare places where Eva feels at home but it also has a traumatic effect on her insofar as Eva's roommate Elsinore attempts to take her own life by drowning herself in the lake.

It is in the second school that Eva meets Iseult Smith from whom she receives the attention she has craved all her life. As Eva approaches her 25th birthday after which she will be able to access the fortune her father left behind, both the Arbles and her legal guardian Constantine Ormeau question her capacity to take care of herself and her wealth. To escape the confining guardianship of both Iseult and Constantine, Eva rents a house in Kent. In a conversation with Iseult at Cathay, Eva tells her that she is to give birth to her baby and flees to America where she would purchase a child to make up for her lie. By Eva's departure time, Iseult already suspects a sexual relationship between her husband Eric and Eva and she cannot help thinking that the father of Eva's child is Eric. This suspicion leads to the dissolution of the Arbles' household.

Part II-Eight Years Later

The second part of the novel is infused with Eva's reconsiderations of her past in her quest of becoming who she is. After her return from the US with her child Jeremy, a boy both "deaf and dumb," Eva falls in love with one of the children she used to hang out with at the Danceys', Henry Dancey, who is now a student at Cambridge University. Although Henry does not feel the same way about Eva in the first place, on their mock hymeneal departure at Victoria station, Henry declares his sincere love for Eva. This unexpected declaration, which makes Eva shed tears of joy, is immediately spoilt by Jeremy who accidentally shoots Eva killing her instantaneously at Victoria Station.

== Characters ==
=== Major characters ===
Eva Trout-is the main character of the novel. She is a 24-year-old, socially awkward woman looking forward to her 25th birthday after which she will be entitled to access the fortune her father bequeathed. Although her guardians have not much confidence in her ability to take care of herself, she is a very independent person making her decisions without paying much attention to what people expect of her. At the end of the first section, Eva travels to the US and spends eight years there. When she comes back, she is the mother of Jeremy whom she apparently purchased from a baby-snatching racket.

Willy Trout- Eva's father. He is an absent character that haunts the novel from the beginning to the end. Despite his poor parenting influence, he bequeaths his daughter a fortune that helps Eva be the independent woman she is.

Iseult Smith-is a former teacher of Eva's who is an idealist teacher at the peak of her career in an English boarding school. The close relationship between Eva and her gradually fades away as Eva starts to live with Iseult and her husband as a paying guest at Larkins, a house located in the middle of fruit trees. She is a very successful teacher pedagogically, but as an intellectual and a wanna-be author of her own novel and an amateur translator, she is rather "an artist manqué", "a façade of erudition."

Eric Arble- Iseult's husband. As one of the few heterosexual couples of the novel, the Arbles don't seem to be enjoying a happy marriage. For Iseult, the main reason for this unhappy marriage is Eva Trout whom they have to take care of or think about all the time.

Constantine Ormeau- the legal guardian of Eva who lives in London. He is one of the homosexual characters in the novel and the lover of Eva's father, Willy Trout.

The Danceys- is a family living in the neighbourhood of Larkins. As the warm and friendly atmosphere of the house fascinates Eva, she spends most of her time with the four children of the Dancey's household.

Henry Dancey- one of the children of the Dancey family. Even as a child, Henry stands out among his siblings with his "composed" and "sardonic" attitude. When Eva comes back from the US, she falls in love with Henry, who is then a student in Cambridge University.

Elsinore-Eva's roommate in the castle by the lake. Upon her unexpected attempt of suicide, her mother takes Elsinore away. Eva can never have done with this separation. In fact, when she accidentally runs into Elsinoere in Chicago, she seems to have a very vivid memory of their school days. However, she is rather cold and unfriendly towards Elsinore when she tells Eva beseechingly: "Take me with you, Trout."

=== Minor characters ===
Mr. Denge-a real estate agent who leases out a house in Kent to Eva.

Tony Clavering-Haight-an Anglican priest and Constantine's lover. Through his long conversation with Eva, the readers get to know how Eva feels about her past after having spent eight years in the USA.

Applethwaite-a sculptor. It is upon her failure to watch Jeremy carefully that Jeremy gets kidnapped.

Kenneth-a homosexual man who has an affair with Constantine. In fact, Willy Trout buys the castle and wants Kenneth to be in administration with the aim of keeping Constantine away from him.

Gerard Bonnard-a French doctor to whom Eva takes Jeremy with the aim of improving his son's communication skills.

Portman C. Holman-a philosophy professor who flies to the USA on the same plane as Eva. The letter he sends to Eva never reaches its destination.

== Themes ==
=== Surface/depth ===
There are two important moments in the novel that we come across the tension between surfaces and depths. Indeed, the novel opens with such a tension: upon the sight of the castle by the lake, Henry Dancey asks: "Is that castle bona fide?" The grandiose appearance of the castle makes Henry feel like there is something unrealistic and inauthentic about the spectacular façade of the castle. In the second moment of Eva's privileging superficiality, she is commenting on the artworks exhibited in the National Portrait Gallery. Eva rejects the view that depths make people's life more real than that of the portraits.

[T]hey were all "pictures." Images. "Nothing but a deck of cards"?–not quite, but nearly enough to defeat Eva. ...They were on show only. Lordily suffering themselves to be portrayed, they'd presented a cool core of resistance even to the most penetrating artist. ... Nothing was to be learned from them (if you excepted learning that nothing was to be learned). In so far as they had an effect on the would-be student, it was a malign one: every soul Eva knew became no longer anything but a portrait. There was no "real life"; no life was more real than this. This she had long suspected. She now was certain.

Eva's renunciation of depths, however, does not prevent her from developing unique relationships with other characters. Given that Bowen never makes a facial description of Eva, the novel showcases Eva's continuous attempts to have a face of her own in her "superficial" and non-identitarian way.

=== Communication ===
==== Verbal communication ====
Communication (verbal and non-verbal) lies at the heart of this novel. Lis Christenson claims that the novel is about the "limits and possibilities of communication." The novel's main character, Eva, style of conversation is described as being "outlandish, cement-like" that was "set" by the time she was sixteen years old and her English teacher, Iseult, met her.

Rev. Dancey is another character who has trouble communicating due to his constant sneezing and hay fever which renders his speech uncomfortable for him and those who hear him as:

his anxiety was his voice, which had taken into varying in volume as uncontrollably as though a poltergeist were fiddling with the controls, sometimes coming out of the sudden boom or roar, sometimes fading till off the air.

Eric Arble and Iseult have problems communication as their conversations are either interrupted by the arrival of Eva or by each other's overwhelmingly emotional reaction to what the other had said. In one instance of misunderstanding, Eric exclaimed to Iseult "that's what comes out of attempting to talk. Can anybody wonder why I keep my mouth shut?"

When Constantine, Eva's guardian, requests that Mr. and Mrs. Arble join him in London to discuss the matter of Eva's desire to move out of the Arble's household, instances of verbal mis-communication occur between Iseult and Constantine. The first instance was when Iseult asked about Eva's mother:

"What was her mother like?"
"Cissie? She was delightful."
"Oh?"
"Yes, indeed—dear Cissie. Such enchanting girlish ways, so charming so often. So deliciously"—his eye skated lifelessly over his guest—"dressed, always. One was devoted to her."
"She does not sound very like Eva."
"Not superficially.—Yes, in her day Cissie played quite a part."
"Oh... Mrs. Arble?"
"Her death."

The second instance of mis-communication was when they were ordering food:

"[Y]ou would not say 'no' to oysters?"
"No."
"No?" asked he, assuming a tragic air.
"I mean, no; I would not say 'no.'"

The novel also showcases instances of the failure of spoken language whereby communication fails and meaning falls through the cracks of language and the instability of the voice to carry out meaning. Bowen expresses a sense of ambivalence towards the "garlands of affection" that the characters bestow upon one another, as language can easily be used to guise, misguide and confuse individuals or hold clandestine meanings. Eva, whose linguistic skills are lacking due to being raised by non-native speakers of English, asks about the meaning of the words that she does not understand and this manner, she unmasks the artificiality lurking behind language.

==== Non-verbal communication ====
Jeremy, Eva's adopted deaf son's ability to communicate with his mother is described as 'extra-sensory.' However, when communication breaks down, Jeremy's angelic behaviour is disrupted by a type of "possession". Jeremy is able to communicate through lip-reading as well as reading faces and expressions of those around him. In the US, Eva and Jeremy would spend hours watching silent movies, and this interest helps them develop their own silent language.

=== Sexuality ===
Sexuality is one of the most crucial aspects of the novel inasmuch as both heterosexual and homosexual desire is exercised on different levels and sometimes towards the same people. First of all, Eva Trout, as a young girl, does not look so feminine physically. In the castle, a student asks her if she is a hermaphrodite. Later, in the English boarding school, Eva's relationship with Elsinore goes beyond an intimate friendship. As Elsinore has to spend all her time in the room as part of her recovery treatment, the bond between them gets even stronger because of the close proximity they find themselves in.

What made Eva visualise this as a marriage chamber? As its climate intensified, all grew tender. To repose a hand on the blanket covering Elsinore was to know in the palm of the hand a primitive tremor—imagining the beating of that other heart, she had passionately solicitous sense of this other presence. Nothing forbad love. This deathly yet living stillness, together, of two beings, this unapartness, came to be the requital of all longing.

Despite Eva's fragmentary memory, when she comes across Elsinore in Chicago many years later, Eva's memories of her affection for Elsinore is still very lucid:

The town room in the castle, the piteous breathing. The blinded window, the banished lake. The dayless and nightless watches, the tent of cobwebs. The hand on the blanket, the beseeching answering beating heart. The dark: the unseen distance, the known nearness. Love: the here and the now and the nothing-but. The step on the stairs. Don't take her away, DON'T take her away. She is all I am. We are all there is.

Eva's extreme attachment to Iseult in the school also has sexual undertones but this affection later evolves into a plotted revenge when Eva, in a conversation with Iseult, does all she can to mislead Iseult into thinking that she and Iseult's husband had a sexual affair.

"You have no notion how Eric misses you. For instance—couldn't you possibly come to us for Christmas? Like you once used to do; I think very happily. And even Christmas seems very far ahead, far too ahead for Eric. Why, if you do come then, it will have been seven—no, eight, nine?—months since he's seen you. A long time."
"Nine," said Eva, looking up at the evergreen.
"Then at least, Christmas?"
"Christmas is in December?"
"It is usually.—Why? Is there anything else you think of doing?"
"In December I shall be having a little child."

When Eva comes back from the US, she is a mother and she devotes most of her time to Jeremy's treatment. Meanwhile, she falls in love with Henry Dancey whom she has always had an admiration for since Henry's childhood. There is also a series of homosexual relationships that determine the course of the novel. Willy Trout's love for Constantine as well as Constantine's interest in Kenneth in the first section and the priest Tony Clavering-Haight in the second, helps Bowen juxtapose and compare heterosexual and homosexual relationships. Although the negative effect of Eva's father's selfish love for Constantine on Eva makes several critics suspicious of homophobic proclivities on Bowen's part, the heterosexual relationships in the novel are as negatively portrayed.

=== Education ===
As a socially awkward girl, Eva needs special attention in her adolescence. But her father's decision as to which school she should go reflects his own concerns rather than hers. After buying a big castle by the lake, he asks his lover Constantine's friend Kenneth to be the administrator. The main aim of this offer, however, is to separate Constantine from Kenneth whom Willy regards as a threat for their relationship. In this school, what interests Eva the most is to watch the dawn in her curtainless room that she shares with Elsinore. Eva's love for Elsinore is profound but they get separated and don't see each other for a long time after Elsonore's mother comes over and takes Elsinore away from the castle. In fact, the school itself closes shortly after Elsinor's departure due to a series of unfortunate incidents including theft, poisoning and arson. After two years, Eva tells her father that she wants to enroll in an English boarding school. In this boarding school, Eva meets Iseult Smith whom she would admire enormously.

Supremacy set apart this wonderful teacher. She could have thought anything.Her dark suit might have been the habit of an Order. ... The intellectual beauty of her sentences was informed by a glow; words she spoke sounded new-minted, unheard before.

Her admiration for Iseult Smith gradually fades away as she feels abandoned and betrayed. Iseult ends up doing more harm to Eva than she initially intends to. In fact, Eva never forgives Iseult for her betrayal. Rather than affirming the institution of education in and of itself, Bowen problematises the concept of help as such insofar as most of the attempts to help others in the novel go wrong, or they don't provide the helpers with the psychic comfort they sought in the first place.

=== Parenting ===
Parenting is another central theme in the novel insofar as we are introduced to a number of individuals who fail to take responsibility for their charges. Eva's father, Willy Trout, fails in his duty as a father when he ignores his daughter's education as well as her emotional needs and carries her around the world like baggage. Eva's mother also fails as a parent when she leaves her husband and daughter behind upon discovering the truth about Willy's homosexuality and his relationship with Constantine. Elsinore's mother who sends her daughter off to the co-educational boarding school to separate her from her the Japanese butler's boy only shows up days after Elsinore attempts to commit suicide by walking into the lake. Her inquiry into her daughter Elsinore's health upon first arriving to take her back home, "How's my darling?" is to haunt Eva for the rest of her life. Incidentally, Elsinore is the first person whom Eva provides with care and affection. With a motherly gesture, Eva insists on staying with Elsinore during her days of illness.

Constantine, the prototype of the evil stepfather, ignores Eva completely until she is to inherit Willy's wealth. His character as well as manner of speech is rather insidious. It is suggested that Willy was mistrustful of Constantine and suspected that he and Kenneth might have had an affair, a matter that could have led to Willy Trout's depression and ultimately his suicide. He is thus neither a good parent to Eva nor a faithful partner.

In spite of his distant relationship with Eva, Constantine regards himself as an authority figure and questions her about her plans about Jeremy's future in Jeremy's presence by asking her:

"What are you going to do about that boy?...His future, his schooling. His disability.—He's your heir, I suppose?"

Constantine is also critical of Eva's over-protectiveness of Jeremy as he accuses her of being negligent in treating Jeremy's deafness and dealing with it.

"[I]t would do the child no harm to see something of the East End: its realities. You keep him in cellophane. You make a plaything of him; at best, a playmate. He may well go on hugging his disability, it's a form of immunity. He does well with it—you make life too charming for him: an Eden. High time he was cast forth from it; as things are, that could only be done across your dead body...what's to come of him when you're gone?"

In fact, Eva's parenting skills with Jeremy surpass the care and parenting her own parents gave her inasmuch as she devotes her time either playing, entertaining, or educating him.

Another parent-like figure is Iseult, who teaches Eva English language and poetry when she was in the English boarding school for girls and takes over the charge of improving Eva's speech and linguistic abilities, yet gives up after a while. The care and interest that Iseult shows for her pupil makes Eva fall in love with her as:

"[t]ill Iseult came, no human being had ever turned upon Eva their full attention—an attention which could seem to be love. Eva know nothing of love but that it existed—that, she should know, having looked on at it. Her existence had gone by under a shadow: the shadow of Willy Trout's total attachment to Constantine."

The fallout between Eva and Iseult results from Eva's great disappointment at her former teacher's abandonment of her as she explains to the priest, father Tony Clavering-Haight:

"She desisted from teaching me. She abandoned my mind. She betrayed my hopes, having led them on. She pretended love, to make me show myself to her—then, thinking she saw all, turned away. She--"
"—Wait a minute; what were your hopes?"
"To learn," said Eva. A long-ago tremble shook her. " To be to become—I had never been," she added "I was beginning to be."
He remarked, with enthusiasm, "A gifted teacher."
"Yes. Then she sent me back."
"Sent you away?"
"No; sent me back again—to be nothing."

So it stands to reason that Mr. and Mrs. Arble's interest in having Eva stay at their house was because they didn't have a child as well as they needed her money and this tension results in their sterility and not being able to make her happy. However, there is a positive representation of parenting in the novel and that is within the Danceys' household. In spite of having major character flaws in the eyes of Eva and being depicted as caricature, the Danceys are among the happiest among the novel's characters.

== Motifs ==
=== Existentialism ===
Focusing on the questions of responsibility, forgiveness, and freedom, the novel resonates with the questions of existentialist philosophy of the second half of the twentieth century. Eva's renunciation of appearances, the intricate web of relations between people who affect one another's life drastically, the play of chanciness and necessity constitute the main existentialist motifs of the novel. The question of authenticity is also relevant inasmuch as both Iseult and Eva seem to suffer from "bad faith." Eva's last words before she gets shot dead by her son, "What is concatenation?," also points at the accumulation of events and their determining effect on one's life. This question adds to many of the other moments, especially in the second part of the novel, in which Eva shows the signs of addressing the constraints of the situations that she finds herself in rather than dismissing them right away. Iseult's bad faith, on the other hand, consists in blaming Eva for all her miseries, disappointments and failures. Contrary to Eva, she considers the givens of the situation to be unchallengeable boundaries. In this regard, the question of an authentic life lies at the heart of the novel.

=== Intertextuality ===
In the novel, there are various references to literary works. Elsinore, Eva's roommate at her first school, the fairy-like little near-albino, whose "washed-out beauty gave her an air of age," is named after the castle in Hamlet and she is referred to by the boy who saved her life as 'Ophelia' illegit." She is 'Juliet' who cries and sobs throughout the night for being separated from the Japanese Butler's son. Eric Arble is described as a 'Macbeth type', 'blackmoor' who cannot proceed without Mrs. Arble. There are also some references to the Book of Genesis, the most obvious being the title of the first chapter, "Genesis." Eva's name might also be associated with Eve. When Constantine says to Eva that she's making an "Eden" out of life for Jeremy and that it is time to "cast him out," the biblical theme of falling is invoked. There is also a curious reference to "Hedda Gabler" in a conversation between Iseult and Eva. Explaining the reason why Iseult took the gun in exchange for the typewriter she left to Eric, Iseult states that it might be a matter of a "Hedda Gabler complex." In this play written by Henrik Ibsen, Hedda hands in a gun to another character to assist him in committing suicide.

== Sources ==
- Bowen, Elizabeth. Eva Trout, Or, Changing Scenes. New York: Anchor, 2003.Print.
- Christensen, Lis. Elizabeth Bowen: The Later Fiction. Copenhagen: Museum Tusculanum Press, 2001. Print.
- Coates, John. "The Misfortunes of Eva Trout." Essays in Criticism 48.1 (1998): 59–79. Oxford Journals. Web. 12 Apr 2010.
- Sartre, Jean-Paul. Being and Nothingness. Trans. Hazel E. Barnes. New York: Washington Square Press, 1992. Print.
- Smith, Patricia Juliana. "'Everything to Dread from the Dispossessed': Changing Scenes and the End of the Modernist Heroine in Elizabeth Bowen's Eva Trout." Hecate 35.1/2 (2009): 228–249. EBSCOhost. Web. 12 Apr 2010.
