= Elizabeth Bowen =

Irish writer (1899-1973)

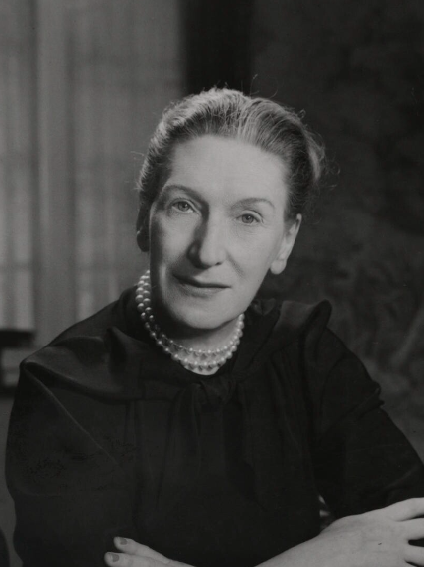
- Bowen c. 1960s
- Born: Elizabeth Dorothea Cole Bowen; 7 June 1899; Dublin, Ireland
- Died: 22 February 1973 (aged 73); London, England
- Resting place: Saint Colman's Church, Farahy
- Spouse: Alan Cameron (m. 1923; died 1952)
- Writing career
- Language: English
- Notable works: The Last September (1929); The House in Paris (1936); The Death of the Heart (1938); The Heat of the Day (1949); Eva Trout (1968)

Elizabeth Dorothea Cole Bowen CBE (/ˈboʊən/ BOH-ən; 7 June 1899 – 22 February 1973) was an Anglo-Irish novelist and short story writer notable for her books about "the Big House" of Irish landed Protestants as well as her fiction about life in wartime London.

In 1958, she was nominated for the Nobel Prize in Literature by Russian-American linguist Roman Jakobson.

== Life ==
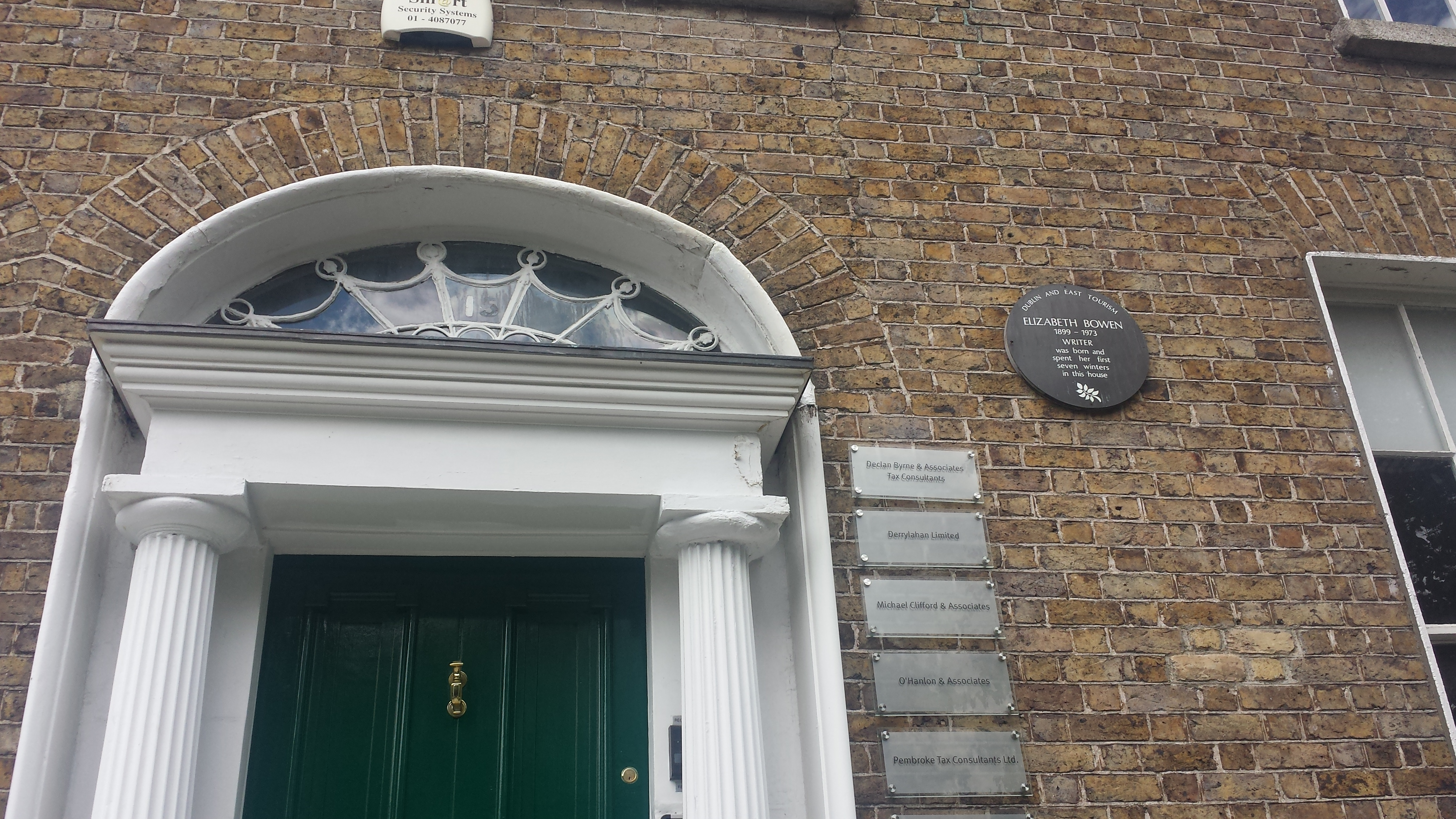
Birth house of Elizabeth Bowen

Elizabeth Dorothea Cole Bowen was born on 7 June 1899 at 15 Herbert Place in Dublin, daughter of barrister Henry Charles Cole Bowen (1862–1930), who succeeded his father as head of their Irish gentry family traced back to the late 1500s, of Welsh origin, and Florence Isabella Pomeroy (died 1912), daughter of Henry FitzGeorge Pomeroy Colley, of Mount Temple, Clontarf, Dublin, grandson of the 4th Viscount Harberton. Florence Bowen's mother was granddaughter of the 4th Viscount Powerscourt. Elizabeth Bowen was baptised in the nearby St Stephen's Church on Upper Mount Street. Her parents later brought her to her father's family home, Bowen's Court at Farahy, near Kildorrery, County Cork, where she spent her summers. Among her enduring childhood friends were the artists Mainie Jellett and Sylvia Cooke-Collis.

When her father became mentally ill in 1907, she and her mother moved to England, eventually settling in Hythe. After her mother died in September 1912, Bowen was brought up by her aunts; her father remarried in 1918. She was educated at Downe House School under the headship of Olive Willis. After some time at art school in London she decided that her talent lay in writing. She mixed with the Bloomsbury Group, becoming good friends with Rose Macaulay, who helped her seek a publisher for her first book, a collection of short stories titled Encounters (1923).

In 1923, she married Alan Cameron, an educational administrator who subsequently worked for the BBC. The marriage has been described as "a sexless but contented union." The marriage was reportedly never consummated. She had various extra-marital relationships, including one with Charles Ritchie, a Canadian diplomat seven years her junior, which lasted over thirty years. She also had an affair with the Irish writer Seán Ó Faoláin and a relationship with the American poet May Sarton.

Bowen and her husband first lived near Oxford, where they socialised with Maurice Bowra, John Buchan, and Susan Buchan, and where she wrote her early novels, including The Last September (1929). Following the publication of To the North (1932), they moved to 2 Clarence Terrace, Regent's Park, London, where she wrote The House in Paris (1936) and The Death of the Heart (1938). In 1937, she became a member of the Irish Academy of Letters.

In 1930, Bowen became the first (and only) woman to inherit Bowen's Court, but remained based in England, making frequent visits to Ireland. During World War II, she worked for the British Ministry of Information, reporting on Irish opinion, particularly on the issue of neutrality. Bowen's political views tended towards Burkean conservatism. During and after the war she wrote about life in wartime London, The Demon Lover and Other Stories (1945) and The Heat of the Day (1948), works which earned acclaim for their depiction of that period. In Ninety-nine Novels, Anthony Burgess wrote of The Heat of the Day that "No novel has better caught the atmosphere of London during the second world war."

Bowen was awarded the CBE in 1948. Her husband retired in 1952 and they settled in Bowen's Court, where he died a few months later. Many writers visited her at Bowen's Court from 1930 onward, including Virginia Woolf, Eudora Welty, Carson McCullers, Iris Murdoch, and the historian Veronica Wedgwood. For years, Bowen struggled to keep the house, lecturing in the United States to earn money.

In 1957, her portrait was painted at Bowen's Court by her friend, painter Patrick Hennessy. She travelled to Italy in 1958 to research and prepare A Time in Rome (1960), but by the following year, Bowen was forced to sell her beloved Bowen's Court, which was demolished in 1960. In the following months, she wrote the narrative of the documentary titled Ireland the Tear and the Smile for CBS which was aimed at American audiences and presented by Walter Cronkite. After spending some years without a permanent home, Bowen finally settled at "Carbery", Church Hill, Hythe, in 1965.

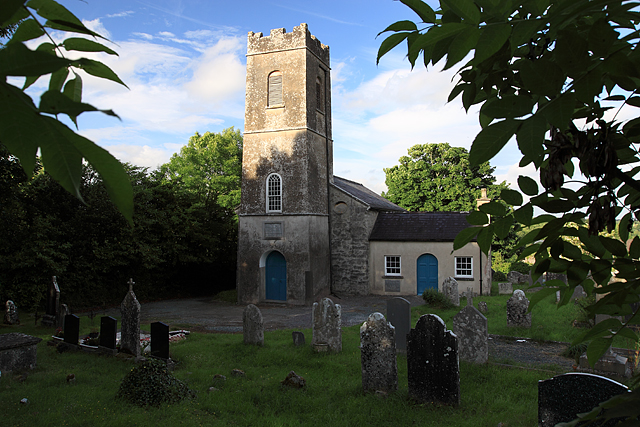
St Colman's Church, Farahy, County Cork, Bowen's burial place

Her final novel, Eva Trout, or Changing Scenes (1968), won the James Tait Black Memorial Prize in 1969 and was shortlisted for the Booker Prize in 1970. Subsequently, she was a judge (alongside her friend Cyril Connolly) that awarded the 1972 Man Booker Prize to John Berger for G. She spent Christmas 1972 at Kinsale, County Cork, with her friends, Major Stephen Vernon and his wife Lady Ursula (daughter of the Duke of Westminster), but was hospitalised upon her return. Here she was visited by Connolly, Lady Ursula Vernon, Isaiah Berlin, Rosamund Lehmann, Charles Ritchie, and her literary agent Spencer Curtis Brown.

In 1972, Bowen developed lung cancer. She died in University College Hospital on 22 February 1973, age 73. She is buried with her husband in St Colman's churchyard in Farahy, close to the gates of Bowen's Court. There is a memorial plaque to the author bearing the words of John Sparrow at the entrance to St Colman's Church, where a commemoration of her life is held annually.

== Legacy ==
In 1977, Victoria Glendinning published the first biography of Elizabeth Bowen. In 2009, Glendinning published Love's Civil War, a compilation of letters Bowen wrote to Charles Ritche during their relationship, and excerpts from Ritchie's diary. In 2012, English Heritage marked Bowen's Regent's Park home at Clarence Terrace with a blue plaque. Another blue plaque was unveiled 19 October 2014 to mark Bowen's residence at the Coach House, The Croft, Headington, from 1925 to 1935.

== Fiction ==
Bowen was interested in "life with the lid on and what happens when the lid comes off", in the innocence of orderly life, and in the eventual, irrepressible forces that transform experience. Bowen also examined the betrayal and secrets that lie beneath a veneer of respectability. The style of her works is highly wrought and owes much to literary modernism.

She was an admirer of film and influenced by the filmmaking techniques of her day. The locations in which Bowen's works are set often bear heavily on the psychology of the characters and on the plots. Bowen's war novel The Heat of the Day (1949) is considered one of the quintessential depictions of London's atmosphere during the bombing raids of World War II.

== Selected works ==
=== Novels ===
- The Hotel (1927)
- The Last September (1929)
- Friends and Relations (1931)
- To the North (1932)
- The House in Paris (1935)
- The Death of the Heart (1938)
- The Heat of the Day (1949)
- A World of Love (1955)
- The Little Girls (1964)
- Eva Trout (1968)

=== Short story collections ===
- Encounters (1923)
- Ann Lee's and Other Stories (1926)
- Joining Charles and Other Stories (1929)
- The Cat Jumps and Other Stories (1934)
- Look at All Those Roses (1941)
- The Demon Lover and Other Stories (1945)
- Ivy Gripped the Steps and Other Stories (1946, USA)
- Stories by Elizabeth Bowen (1959)
- A Day in the Dark and Other Stories (1965)
- The Good Tiger (1965, children's book) - illustrated by M. Nebel (1965 edition) and Quentin Blake (1970 edition)
- Elizabeth Bowen's Irish Stories (1978)
- The Collected Stories of Elizabeth Bowen (1980)
- The Bazaar and Other Stories (2008) - edited by Allan Hepburn
- Collected Stories (2019)

=== Non-fiction ===
- Bowen's Court (1942, 1964)
- Seven Winters: Memories of a Dublin Childhood (1942)
- English Novelists (1942)
- Anthony Trollope: A New Judgement (1946)
- Why Do I Write?: An Exchange of Views between Elizabeth Bowen, Graham Greene and V.S. Pritchett (1948)
- Collected Impressions (1950)
- The Shelbourne (1951)
- A Time in Rome (1960)
- Afterthought: Pieces About Writing (1962)
- Pictures and Conversations (1975), edited by Spencer Curtis Brown
- The Mulberry Tree: Writings of Elizabeth Bowen (1999), edited by Hermione Lee
- "Notes on Éire": Espionage Reports to Winston Churchill by Elizabeth Bowen, 1940–1942 (2008), edited by Jack Lane and Brendan Clifford
- People, Places, Things: Essays by Elizabeth Bowen (2008) - edited by Allan Hepburn
- Love's Civil War: Elizabeth Bowen and Charles Ritchie: Letters and Diaries, 1941–1973 (2009), edited by Victoria Glendinning and Judith Robertson
- Listening In: Broadcasts, Speeches, and Interviews by Elizabeth Bowen (2010), edited by Allan Hepburn
- Elizabeth Bowen's Selected Irish Writings (2011), edited by Éibhear Walshe
- The Weight of a World of Feeling: Reviews and Essays by Elizabeth Bowen (2016), edited by Allan Hepburn

=== Short stories ===
Title	Publication	Collected in
"Salon des Dames"	The Westminster Gazette (7 April 1923)	The Bazaar and Other Stories
"Breakfast"	Encounters (May 1923)	Encounters
"Daffodils"	Encounters (May 1923)	Encounters
"The Return"	Encounters (May 1923)	Encounters
"The Confidante"	Encounters (May 1923)	Encounters
"Requiescat"	Encounters (May 1923)	Encounters
"All Saints"	Encounters (May 1923)	Encounters
"The New House"	Encounters (May 1923)	Encounters
"Lunch"	Encounters (May 1923)	Encounters
"The Lover"	Encounters (May 1923)	Encounters
"Mrs. Windermere"	Encounters (May 1923)	Encounters
"The Shadowy Third"	Encounters (May 1923)	Encounters
"The Evil That Men Do—"	Encounters (May 1923)	Encounters
"Sunday Evening"	Encounters (May 1923)	Encounters
"Coming Home"	Encounters (May 1923)	Encounters
"Moses"	The Westminster Gazette (30 June 1923)	The Bazaar and Other Stories
"Making Arrangements"	Everybody's Magazine (June 1924)	Ann Lee's and Other Stories
"Ann Lee's"	The Spectator (5 July 1924)	Ann Lee's and Other Stories
"The Contessina"	The Queen (12 November 1924)	Ann Lee's and Other Stories
"The Parrot"	Everybody's Magazine (April 1925)	Ann Lee's and Other Stories
"The Visitor"	Ann Lee's and Other Stories (April 1926)	Ann Lee's and Other Stories
"Human Habitation"	Ann Lee's and Other Stories (April 1926)	Ann Lee's and Other Stories
"The Secession"	Ann Lee's and Other Stories (April 1926)	Ann Lee's and Other Stories
"The Storm"	Ann Lee's and Other Stories (April 1926)	Ann Lee's and Other Stories
"Charity"	Ann Lee's and Other Stories (April 1926)	Ann Lee's and Other Stories
"The Back Drawing-Room"	Ann Lee's and Other Stories (April 1926)	Ann Lee's and Other Stories
"Recent Photograph"	Ann Lee's and Other Stories (April 1926)	Ann Lee's and Other Stories
"Just Imagine..."	Eve (October 1926)	The Bazaar and Other Stories
"Joining Charles" a.k.a. "The White House"	The Royal Magazine (November 1926)	Joining Charles and Other Stories
"Aunt Tatty"	The Queen (25 December 1926)	Joining Charles and Other Stories
"Telling"	The Black Cap, ed. Lady Cynthia Asquith (October 1927)	Joining Charles and Other Stories
"Maria"	The Funny Bone, ed. Asquith (November 1928)	The Cat Jumps and Other Stories
"The Pink Biscuit"	Eve (22 November 1928)	The Bazaar and Other Stories
"The Jungle"	Joining Charles and Other Stories (July 1929)	Joining Charles and Other Stories
"Shoes: An International Episode"	Joining Charles and Other Stories (July 1929)	Joining Charles and Other Stories
"The Dancing-Mistress"	Joining Charles and Other Stories (July 1929)	Joining Charles and Other Stories
"Dead Mabelle"	Joining Charles and Other Stories (July 1929)	Joining Charles and Other Stories
"The Working Party"	Joining Charles and Other Stories (July 1929)	Joining Charles and Other Stories
"Foothold"	Joining Charles and Other Stories (July 1929)	Joining Charles and Other Stories
"The Cassowary"	Joining Charles and Other Stories (July 1929)	Joining Charles and Other Stories
"Mrs. Moysey"	Joining Charles and Other Stories (July 1929)	Joining Charles and Other Stories
"The Cat Jumps"	Shudders, Asquith (September 1929)	The Cat Jumps and Other Stories
"The Tommy Crans"	"The Broadsheet Press" (February 1930)	The Cat Jumps and Other Stories
"Her Table Spread" a.k.a. "A Conversation Picture" a.k.a. "A Conversation Piece"	"The Broadsheet Press" (4 May 1930)	The Cat Jumps and Other Stories
"The Apple Tree"	When Churchyards Yawn, Asquith (September 1931)	The Cat Jumps and Other Stories
"Flavia"	The Fothergill Omnibus (November 1931)	The Bazaar and Other Stories
"Brigands"	The Silver Ship, Asquith (October 1932)	The Bazaar and Other Stories
"She Gave Him"	Consequences, ed. A. E. Coppard (November 1932)	The Bazaar and Other Stories
"The Good Girl"	Time and Tide (11 February 1933)	The Cat Jumps and Other Stories
"The Little Girl's Room"	London Mercury (July 1933)	The Cat Jumps and Other Stories
"The Last Night in the Old Home"	The Cat Jumps and Other Stories (July 1934)	The Cat Jumps and Other Stories
"The Disinherited"	The Cat Jumps and Other Stories (July 1934)	The Cat Jumps and Other Stories
"Firelight in the Flat"	The Cat Jumps and Other Stories (July 1934)	The Cat Jumps and Other Stories
"The Man of the Family"	The Cat Jumps and Other Stories (July 1934)	The Cat Jumps and Other Stories
"The Needlecase"	The Cat Jumps and Other Stories (July 1934)	The Cat Jumps and Other Stories
"The Unromantic Princess"	The Princess Elizabeth Gift Book, ed. Asquith and Eileen Bigland (1935)	The Bazaar and Other Stories
"Reduced"	The Listener (12 June 1935)	Look at All Those Roses
"Attractive Modern Homes"	The Listener (15 April 1936)	Look at All Those Roses
"Tears, Idle Tears"	The Listener (2 September 1936)	Look at All Those Roses
"Look at All Those Roses"	The Listener (10–17 November 1937)	Look at All Those Roses
"A Walk in the Woods"	London Mercury (December 1937)	Look at All Those Roses
"The Easter Egg Party"	London Mercury (April 1938)	Look at All Those Roses
"A Queer Heart" a.k.a. "The Same Way Home"	London Mercury (December 1938)	Look at All Those Roses
"The Girl with the Stoop"	John O'London's Weekly (23 December 1938)	Look at All Those Roses
"Number 16"	The Listener (19 January 1939)	Look at All Those Roses
"Love"	The Listener (26 October 1939)	Look at All Those Roses
"A Love Story" a.k.a. "A Love Story, 1939"	Horizon (July 1940)	Look at All Those Roses
"Unwelcome Idea"	New Statesman (10 August 1940)	Look at All Those Roses
"Oh, Madam..."	The Listener (5 December 1940)	Look at All Those Roses
"Summer Night"	Look at All Those Roses (January 1941)	Look at All Those Roses
"Sunday Afternoon"	Life and Letters To-Day (July 1941)	The Demon Lover and Other Stories
"In the Square"	Horizon (September 1941)	The Demon Lover and Other Stories
"Careless Talk" a.k.a. "Everything's Frightfully Interesting"	The New Yorker (11 October 1941)	The Demon Lover and Other Stories
"The Demon Lover"	The Listener (6 November 1941)	The Demon Lover and Other Stories
"Pink May"	English Story #3 (October 1942)	The Demon Lover and Other Stories
"The Cheery Soul"	The Listener (4 December 1942)	The Demon Lover and Other Stories
"The Inherited Clock"	The Cornhill Magazine (January 1944)	The Demon Lover and Other Stories
"Mysterious Kor"	Penguin New Writing #20 (August 1944)	The Demon Lover and Other Stories
"Songs My Father Sang Me"	English Story #5 (November 1944)	The Demon Lover and Other Stories
"The Happy Autumn Fields"	The Cornhill Magazine (November 1944)	The Demon Lover and Other Stories
"Green Holly"	The Listener (21 December 1944)	The Demon Lover and Other Stories
"Comfort and Joy"	Modern Reading #11 & 12, ed. Reginald Moore (Winter 1945)	The Bazaar and Other Stories
"Ivy Gripped the Steps"	Horizon (September 1945)	The Demon Lover and Other Stories
"I Hear You Say So"	New Writing and Daylight #6 (September 1945)	A Day in the Dark and Other Stories
"Gone Away"	The Listener (3 January 1946)	A Day in the Dark and Other Stories
"The Good Earl"	Diversion, ed. Hester W. Chapman (September 1946)	The Bazaar and Other Stories
"The Lost Hope"	The Sunday Times (29 September 1946)	The Bazaar and Other Stories
"I Died of Love"	Choice: Some New Stories and Prose, ed. William Sansom (November 1946)	The Bazaar and Other Stories
"So Much Depends"	Woman's Day (September 1951)	The Bazaar and Other Stories
"Hand in Glove"	The Second Ghost Book, Asquith (October 1952)	A Day in the Dark and Other Stories
"Emergency in the Gothic Wing"	Tatler (18 November 1954)	The Bazaar and Other Stories
"The Claimant"	Vogue (15 November 1955)	The Bazaar and Other Stories
"A Day in the Dark"	Mademoiselle (July 1957)	A Day in the Dark and Other Stories
"Candles in the Window"	Woman's Day (December 1958)	The Bazaar and Other Stories
"Happiness"	Woman's Day (December 1959)	The Bazaar and Other Stories
"The Dolt's Tale"	A Day in the Dark and Other Stories (June 1965)	A Day in the Dark and Other Stories

== Television and film adaptations ==
- The House in Paris (BBC, 1959) starring Pamela Brown, Trader Faulkner, Clare Austin and Vivienne Bennett
- The Death of the Heart (1987) starring Patricia Hodge, Nigel Havers, Robert Hardy, Phyllis Calvert, Wendy Hiller and Miranda Richardson
- The Heat of the Day (Granada Television, 1989) starring Patricia Hodge, Michael Gambon, Michael York, Peggy Ashcroft and Imelda Staunton
- The Last September (1999) starring Maggie Smith, Michael Gambon, Fiona Shaw, Jane Birkin, Lambert Wilson, David Tennant, Richard Roxburgh and Keeley Hawes
