= Deborah Warner =

British theatre director (born 1959)

Deborah Warner CBE
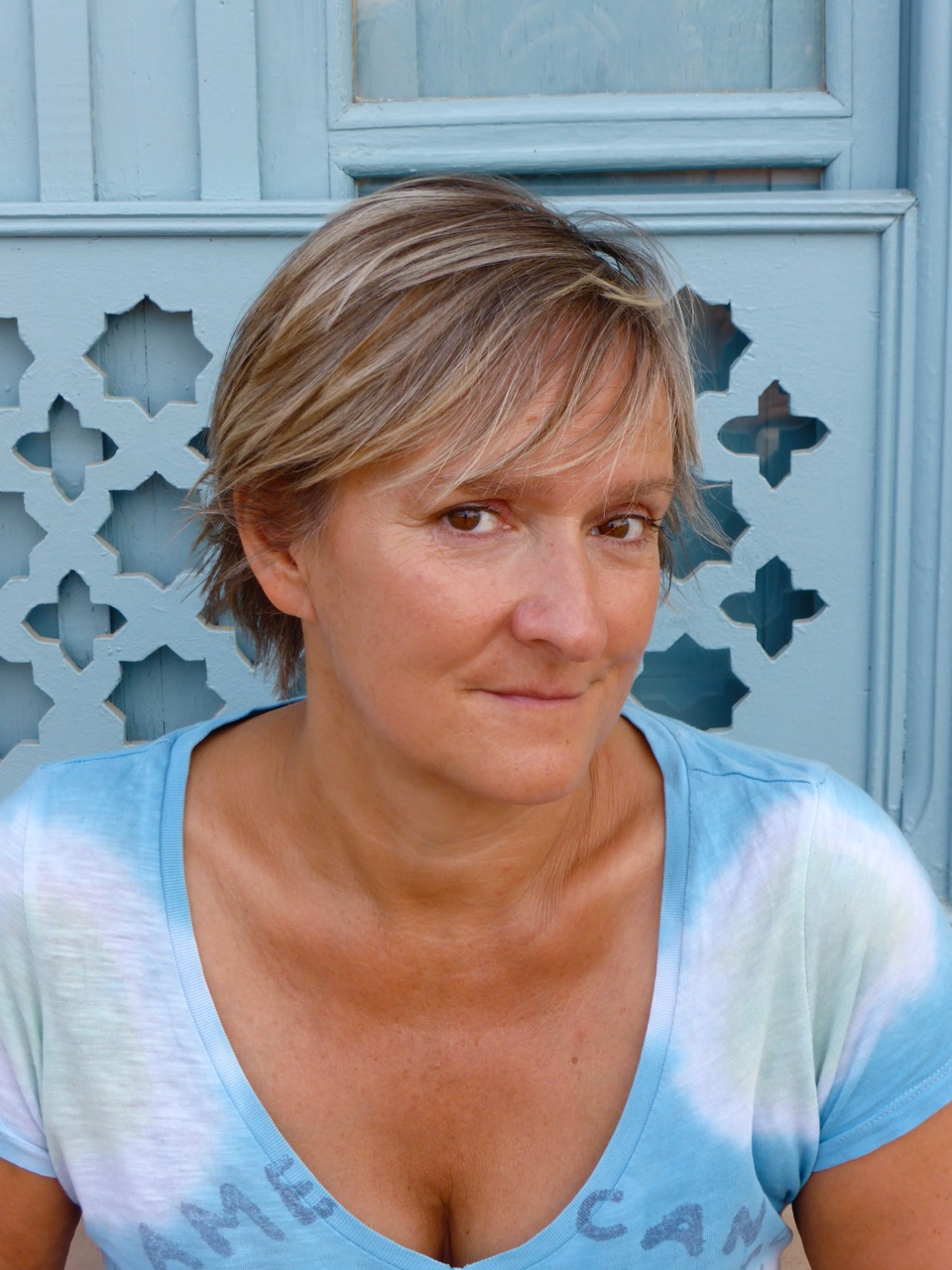
- Born: 12 May 1959 (age 67); Oxfordshire, England
- Education: Royal Central School of Speech and Drama
- Occupation: Theatre director
- Years active: 1980–present

Deborah Warner CBE (born 12 May 1959) is a British director of theatre and opera and arts administrator. She is known for her interpretations of the works of Shakespeare, Bertolt Brecht, Benjamin Britten, and Henrik Ibsen, and for her collaborations with Irish actress Fiona Shaw.

== Early life and education ==
Warner was born on 12 May 1959 in Oxford, England, to antiquarians Roger Harold Metford Warner and Ruth Ernestine Hurcombe.

After attending Sidcot School and St Clare's, Oxford, she studied Stage Management at Central School of Speech and Drama.

In 1980, she founded the KICK theatre company when she was 21.

== Career ==
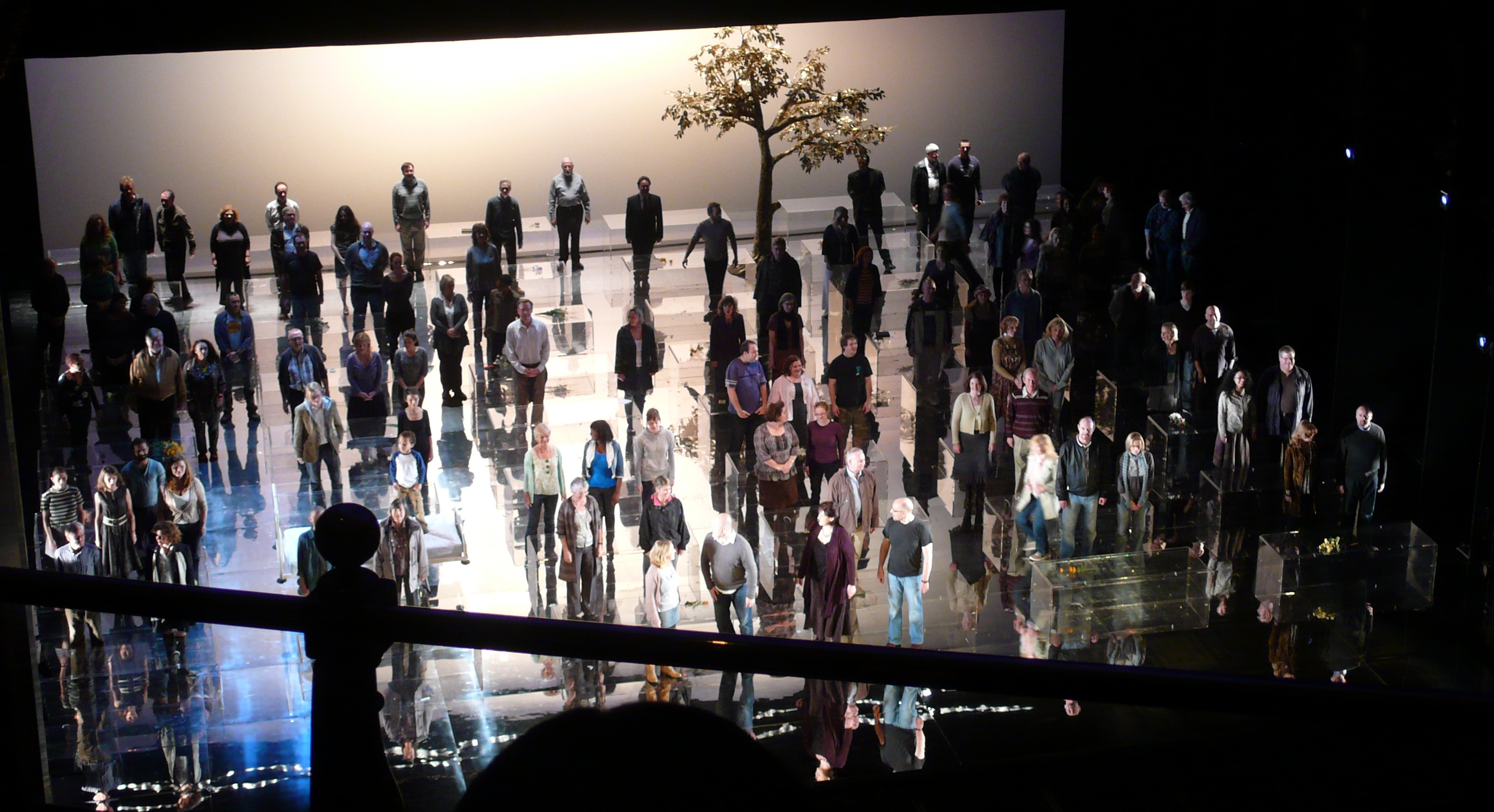
Warner's ENO production of Handel's Messiah (London Coliseum, 2009)

Warner has since the 1980s worked in close creative partnership with the actor Fiona Shaw, developing a wide range of projects that have been seen throughout Europe and the United States. The Sunday Times' critic John Peter wrote of their vision of Richard II that "Warner and Shaw are not being either fashionable or reactionary ... They are making theatre that is an adventure, a journey of the mind, a discovery of other ages, other countries, other people, other minds." Warner has also enjoyed long-term collaborations with the designers Jean Kalman, Hildegard Bechtler, Chloé Obolensky, Tom Pye, the composer Mel Mercier and the choreographer Kim Brandstrup.

Although the majority of her work has focused on major classics of spoken drama and opera, she has also experimented with the performance of poetry (The Waste Land, Readings) and the staging of oratorios (St John Passion, Messiah), as well as installations (The St Pancras and Angel projects, Peace Camp). She has made relatively few excursions into new work (Jeanette Winterson's The Powerbook (2002), Tansy Davies' 2015 opera Between Worlds and The Testament of Mary being exceptions) or comedy (The School for Scandal), and although she has made much creative use of video on stage, she has directed little for film and television.

Her first creations for Kick, a company that she started and managed, were deeply influenced by the example of Peter Brook and his belief that the performer must always be at the centre of the event. "I'm not sure I would have been in any way conscious of the potency of theatre if I hadn't seen his work", she said in an interview with Vogue in July 1994. Other figures important in her formative years include Peter Stein, who commissioned her production of Coriolanus at the Salzburg Festival, and Nicholas Payne and Anthony Whitworth-Jones who commissioned her first essays in opera, at Opera North and Glyndebourne respectively.

Although she has refused to subscribe to a programmatic feminism or a political ideology, her work has often explored issues of gender, notably in her ground-breaking casting of Fiona Shaw as Shakespeare's Richard II. She was also the first woman director to be given sole charge of a production in the main house of the Royal Shakespeare Theatre.

In January 2026, the Park Avenue Armory Conservancy announced the appointment of Warner as its artistic director, with immediate effect.

=== Theatre ===
In 1987 Warner joined the Royal Shakespeare Company, where she directed Titus Andronicus and where she also began her long-time collaboration with Fiona Shaw. Warner and Shaw have collaborated on many plays, including Electra (RSC); The Good Person of Sezuan (1989, National Theatre); Hedda Gabler (1991, The Abbey Theatre and BBC2); the controversial Richard II, with Shaw in the title role, also at the National Theatre (1995) and televised by BBC2; Footfalls, whose radical staging so enraged the Beckett estate that the production was pulled during its run; The PowerBook, at the National Theatre, a dramatisation of Jeanette Winterson's novel; Medea (2000–2001, Queen's Theatre and Broadway); and Shakespeare's Julius Caesar, in which Shaw played the small part of Portia. The production starred Ralph Fiennes and Simon Russell Beale; first staged at the Barbican Centre, it later toured Europe.

Shaw and Warner toured the world with T. S. Eliot's The Waste Land, which began in Wilton's Music Hall in London's East End. Her work began to focus on the link of drama to places, a theme which was expanded upon in her Angel Project.

In 2007, following negotiations with the Beckett estate, Warner directed Shaw in Happy Days at the National Theatre, which toured internationally including at the ancient amphitheatre at Epidaurus in Greece and Brooklyn Academy of Music in New York, followed in 2009 by Mother Courage and Her Children (with Shaw in the title role) at the Olivier Theatre at the National.

She returned to the Barbican Centre in 2011 to direct The School for Scandal.

=== Opera and classical music ===
Warner has also worked extensively in field of opera and classical music, including a production of The Diary of One Who Disappeared by Janáček starring Ian Bostridge; a staging of the St John Passion at English National Opera; a controversial staging of Mozart's Don Giovanni at Glyndebourne; Wozzeck for Opera North; Death in Venice and Tansy Davies' Between Worlds at English National Opera; and Henry Purcell's Dido and Aeneas with Les Arts Florissants in Vienna, Paris, and Amsterdam.

Other notable productions include opening the 2015/15 season at La Scala, Milan, with Fidelio conducted by Daniel Barenboim and Tchaikovsky's Eugene Onegin at the Metropolitan Opera in New York in the 2013/2014 season.

She frequently collaborates with Canadian set designer Michael Levine.

=== Film ===
Warner directed the 1999 film The Last September, starring Michael Gambon and Maggie Smith.

== Recognition and awards ==
=== Awards ===
- 1988 Laurence Olivier Award for Best Director – Titus Andronicus
- 1992 Laurence Olivier Award for Best Director of a Play – Hedda Gabler
- 1992 Chevalier of the Ordre des Arts et des Lettres
- 2006 Commander of the Order of the British Empire (CBE), "for services to drama"

=== Nominations ===
- 1997 Drama Desk Award for Outstanding Director of a Play – The Waste Land
- 2003 Drama Desk Award for Outstanding Director of a Play – Medea
- 2003 Tony Award for Best Direction of a Play – Medea
- 2008 Drama Desk Award for Outstanding Director of a Play – Happy Days

== Plays and operas ==
Year	Work	Place
1980	The Good Person of Szechwan	Kick Theatre Company: Oxford
1981	Woyzeck	Kick Theatre Company: Edinburgh Fringe
1982	Woyzeck	Kick Theatre Company: Edinburgh Fringe
1983	The Tempest	Kick Theatre Company: Edinburgh Fringe
1984	Measure for Measure	Kick Theatre Company: Edinburgh Fringe
1984	The Tempest	Contact Theatre, Manchester
1985	Measure for Measure	Kick Theatre Company: Glasgow Mayfest; Hemel Hempstead; British Council tour, Israel Festival; Bridge Lane Theatre, London; Wells-next-the Sea
1985	King Lear	Kick Theatre Company: Edinburgh Fringe; Almeida Theatre, London; British Council tour, Yugoslavia and Egypt
1986	Coriolanus	Kick Theatre Company: Edinburgh Fringe; Almeida Theatre, London
1987	Titus Andronicus	Royal Shakespeare Company: The Swan, Stratford
1987	The Tempest	British Council tour, Bangladesh
1988	King John	Royal Shakespeare Company: The Other Place, Stratford
1988	Electra	Royal Shakespeare Company: The Pit, Barbican Centre, London
1988	Titus Andronicus	Royal Shakespeare Company: The Pit, Barbican Centre, London
1989	Titus Andronicus	Royal Shakespeare Company: The Pit, Barbican Centre, London; Madrid; Bouffes du Nord, Paris; Copenhagen; Aarhus
1989	King John	Royal Shakespeare Company: The Pit, Barbican Centre, London
1989	The Good Person of Szechwan	National Theatre, London
1990	King Lear	National Theatre, London: Tokyo; Nottingham; Cardiff; Leeds; Belfast; Schauspielhaus, Hamburg; Teatro Lirico, Milan; Odéon, Paris; Cork Opera House; Cairo Opera House
1991	King Lear	National Theatre, London; National Theatre (Prague); National Theatre Bucharest; Schauspielhaus, Leipzig; Edinburgh
1991	Hedda Gabler	Abbey Theatre, Dublin and Playhouse Theatre, London
1991	Electra	Royal Shakespeare Company / Thelma Holt: MC 93 Bobigny, Paris; Derry; Tramway, Glasgow; Bradford
1993	Wozzeck	Opera North; Leeds; Manchester; Nottingham; Hull; Sheffield
1993	Coriolanus	Salzburg Festival: Felsenreitschule
1993	Hedda Gabler	BBC
1994	Don Giovanni	Glyndebourne
1994	Footfalls	Garrick Theatre, London
1994	Coriolanus	Salzburg Festival: Felsenreitschule
1995	Richard II	National Theatre, London
1995	The Waste Land	Kunsten Festival, Brussels; Dublin Theatre Festival
1995	Don Giovanni	Glyndebourne
1995	The St Pancras Project	St Pancras Chambers, London
1996	Richard II	MC93 Bobigny and Pernel Insel, Salzburg Festival
1996	The Waste Land	École nationale supérieure des Beaux-Arts, Paris; Gooderham and Worts Factory, Toronto; Rialto Cinema, Montreal; Liberty Theatre, New York
1996	Wozzeck	Opera North: Leeds, Manchester; Nottingham; Hull; and Sheffield
1997	Richard II	Film
1997	The Waste Land	Liberty Theatre, New York; Everyman Palace Theatre, Cork; Wilton's Music Hall, London
1997	Jeanne d'Arc au Bucher	BBC Proms at Royal Albert Hall, London
1997	The Turn of the Screw	Royal Opera: Barbican Centre, London
1997	Une Maison de Poupée	Théâtre de l'Odéon, Paris
1998	The Waste Land	Wilton's Music Hall, London; MC93 Bobigny, Paris; Royalty Theatre, Adelaide; Brighton Festival
1998	The Turn of the Screw	Royal Opera: MC 93 Bobigny, Paris
1999	The Last September	Film
1999	The Diary of One Who Disappeared	English National Opera: Coliseum, London; Dublin Theatre Festival; MC 93 Bobigny, Paris
1999	The Angel Project	London International Festival of Theatre
1999	The Diary of One Who Disappeared	English National Opera: National Theatre, London
2000	The Angel Project	Perth International Arts Festival
2000	The Waste Land	His Majesty's Theatre, Perth
2000	Medea	Abbey Theatre, Dublin
2000	St John Passion	English National Opera; London Coliseum
2000	The Diary of One Who Disappeared	English National Opera: Stadsschouwburg, Holland Festival; Musiktheater, Munich
2001	The Waste Land	Bergen International Festival
2001	Medea	Queen's Theatre, London
2001	The Diary of One Who Disappeared	English National Opera: Lincoln Center, New York
2001	Fidelio	Glyndebourne: BBC Proms, Woking; Norwich; Milton Keynes; Plymouth; Oxford; Stoke-on-Trent
2002	The Power Book	National Theatre, London
2002	Fidelio	Théâtre du Chatelet, Paris
2002	The Turn of the Screw	Royal Opera House, London
2002	Medea	Abbey Theatre and Extremetaste: Brooklyn Academy of Music; Ann Arbor, Michigan; Wilbur Theatre, Boston; Kennedy Center, Washington DC; Zellerbach Hall, Berkeley
2003	Medea	Brooks Atkinson Theatre, New York; Théâtre de Chaillot, Paris
2003	The Angel Project	Lincoln Center Festival, New York
2003	The Power Book	National Theatre: Théâtre de Chaillot, Paris; RomaEuropa, Rome
2004	Small Wonder	Charleston Festival
2004	The Rape of Lucretia	Bayerische Staatsoper, Munich
2005	Julius Caesar	Barbican Theatre, London; Théâtre de Chaillot, Paris; Teatro Espanol, Madrid; Luxembourg
2005	Readings	Théâtre de Chaillot, Paris
2006	Dido and Aeneas	Wiener Festwochen, Vienna
2006	La voix humaine	Opera North: Leeds; Salford; Nottingham; Sadler's Wells, London; Newcastle
2006	Readings	Sala Umberto, RomaEuropa Festival
2007	Happy Days	National Theatre, London: Holland Festival, Amsterdam; Théâtre de Chaillot, Paris; Epidavros; Abbey Theatre, Dublin; Brooklyn Academy of Music, New York
2007	Death in Venice	English National Opera: London Coliseum
2007	Readings	Holland Festival, Amsterdam
2008	Dido and Aeneas	Opéra Comique, Paris
2009	Mother Courage and Her Children	National Theatre, London
2009	The Waste Land	Wilton's Music Hall, London
2009	Death in Venice	La Monnaie, Brussels
2009	Dido and Aeneas	Wiener Festwochen, Vienna and Netherlands Opera, Amsterdam
2009	Messiah	English National Opera: London Coliseum
2010	The Waste Land	Madrid Festival
2011	Death in Venice	Teatro alla Scala, Milan
2011	Eugene Onegin	English National Opera: London Coliseum
2011	The School for Scandal	Barbican Theatre
2012	Dido and Aeneas	Opéra Comique, Paris
2012	La traviata	Wiener Festwochen, Vienna
2012	Messiah	Opéra de Lyon
2012	Peace Camp	London 2012 Cultural Olympics, UK: Cuckmere Haven, Sussex; Godrevy, Cornwall; Camaes, Anglesey; White Park Bay, Co Antrim; Mussenden Temple, Co Londonderry; Valtos, Isle of Lewis; Fort Diddes, Aberdeenshire; Dusntanburgh, Northumberland
2013	The Testament of Mary	Walter Kerr Theatre, New York
2013	Eugene Onegin	Metropolitan Opera, New York
2014	The Testament of Mary	Barbican Theatre, London
2014	Fidelio	Teatro alla Scala, Milan
2015	Between Worlds	English National Opera: Barbican Theatre, London
2016	The Tempest (Der Sturm)	Salzburg Festival: Perner Insel
2016	King Lear	The Old Vic, London
2017	Billy Budd	Teatro Real, Madrid
2017	The Testament of Mary	Comédie-Francaise: Odéon, Paris
2017	Eugene Onegin	Metropolitan Opera, New York
2018	Billy Budd	Teatro Costanzi, Rome
2018	Fidelio	Teatro alla Scala, Milan
2018	La Traviata	Théâtre des Champs-Élysées, Paris
2023	Peter Grimes	Opéra national de Paris, Paris
2023	Wozzeck	The Royal Opera House, London

Cultural offices
Preceded by Pierre Audi	Artistic Director, Park Avenue Armory; 2026-present	Succeeded by incumbent
