= Bowen's Court =

Georgian house in County Cork, Ireland

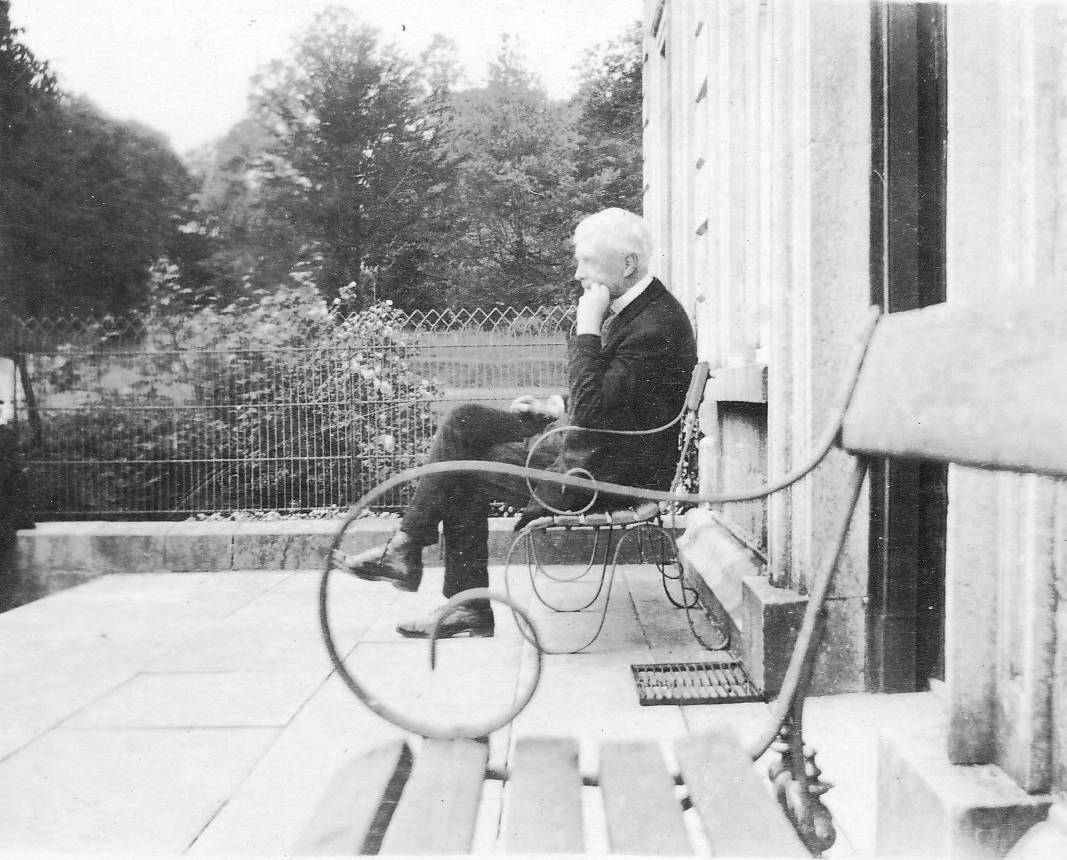
- Henry Bowen on the terrace of Bowen's Court (July 1919)

- Location within Ireland
- Former names: Faraghy

General information
- Status: Private dwelling house
- Type: House
- Architectural style: Georgian
- Classification: Demolished
- Location: Farahy, County Cork, Ireland
- Coordinates: 52.2412°N 8.4628°W
- Estimated completion: 1770
- Demolished: 1959

Height
- Height: 30 m (98 ft)

Technical details
- Floor count: 3 over basement

Design and construction
- Architect: Isaac Rothery
- Developer: Henry Cole Bowen

Bowen's Court was a historic country house or Anglo-Irish big house in the townland of Faraghy near Kildorrery in County Cork, Ireland.

== House ==
The house was built in the 1770s by Henry Cole Bowen (died 1788) and the design has tentatively been attributed to Isaac Rothery or his sons who designed nearby Doneraile Court and was also involved in the completion of Mount Ievers Court. The Bowen family were minor Irish gentry, of Welsh origin traced back to the late 1500s resident in County Cork since Henry Bowen, a "notoriously irreligious" Colonel in the army of the regicide Cromwell, settled in Ireland.

In 1786, the house was referred to as Faraghy, the seat of Mr. Cole Bowen. The house was inherited by his son, Henry Cole Bowen who married Catherine, daughter of Henry Prittie, 1st Baron Dunalley. The house was attacked during the Irish Rebellion of 1798. It was held at one time by Mrs Eliza Bowen (died 1868), wife of Henry Cole Bowen (1808-1841), when it was valued at £75. The house was then inherited by their son Robert St John Cole Bowen.

Bowen's Court remained the Bowen family seat until 1959. The last owner was the novelist Elizabeth Bowen. She had a nervous breakdown in the 1950s and abandoned Bowen's Court, leaving unpaid wages and bills, then sold it and stayed with friends and at hotels, before she rented a flat in Oxford. Bowen's Court was purchased, then demolished, by a developer in 1959. The majority of the contents of the house were sold at auction in April 1960 while the contents of the library were sold in 1961.

== Book ==
Elizabeth Bowen wrote a history of the house, entitled Bowen's Court, in 1942 and it is featured in her 1929 novel The Last September.
