= The Death of the Heart =

1938 novel by Elizabeth Bowen

- Cover of the first US edition
- Author: Elizabeth Bowen
- Language: English
- Publisher: Victor Gollancz Ltd (UK); Alfred A. Knopf (US)
- Publication date: 1938 (UK); January 23, 1939 (US)
- Publication place: London, England (UK); New York City, New York (US)
- Media type: Print (hardcover)
- Pages: 445 (UK)
- OCLC: 479391

The Death of the Heart is a 1938 novel by Elizabeth Bowen set in the interwar period. It is about a sixteen-year-old orphan, Portia Quayne, who moves to London to live with her half-brother Thomas and falls in love with Eddie, a friend of her sister-in-law.

Bowen called it a 'pre-war' novel, "a novel which reflects the time, the pre-war time with its high tension, its increasing anxieties, and this great stress on individualism. People were so conscious of themselves, and of each other, and of their personal relationships because they thought that everything of that time might soon end."

== Synopsis ==
At the beginning of the novel, Portia moves in with Anna and Thomas Quayne after her mother dies. Portia is Thomas's half sister. Mr. Quayne (Thomas's father) had an extramarital affair with Irene (Portia's mother) while married to Thomas's mother. When Irene became pregnant, and Mrs. Quayne learned of it, she was adamant that he do what was the right thing: so, at his own wife's unyielding insistence, Mr. Quayne divorced Thomas's mother and married Irene. Mr. Quayne, Irene, and Portia then left England and travelled through Europe as exiles from society and from the Quayne family, living in the cheapest of lodgings. Irene and Portia continued to live in this fashion until, when Portia was 16, Irene died. Portia was sent to live with Thomas and Anna after Irene's death. The plan is that she is to stay with them for one year at which time Portia will leave and move in with Irene's sister (Portia's aunt).

Portia is a naturally awkward girl, and this aspect of her personality has been intensified by her strange childhood which was one of constant travel, change, and strangers, while at the same time being incredibly isolating. She is uniquely innocent in her observations of people, and is baffled by inconsistencies between what they say and what they do, and wonders why people say things they do not mean. She keeps a diary detailing the lives of those around her, particularly Anna, trying to understand the key to people she thinks she is missing. Anna finds and reads Portia's diary; she is incensed by the idea of the girl observing her every move, and rages about the girl to her friend St. Quentin, a writer and frequent visitor to the Quaynes's home. It becomes clear over the course of the novel that Anna dislikes Portia because she is strange. Anna and Thomas are generally uncomfortable with Portia in their home but try to make do. They send her to classes where she makes friends with a girl named Lilian.

Portia's love interest, if she can be said to have one, is a man named Eddie. Eddie works at Thomas's advertising agency. He also has a flirtatious relationship with Anna prior to Portia's arrival. Eddie does not truly love Portia.

Partway through the novel, Anna and Thomas go on holiday to Italy and send Portia to live with Anna's former governess, Mrs. Heccomb, for the duration of the trip.

The climax of the novel occurs when St. Quentin, a friend of Anna's, tells Portia that Anna has been reading her diary. As a result of this Portia runs away. She first goes to Eddie who becomes overwhelmed by her and sends her away telling her that he is Anna's lover (which is not true). Portia then takes refuge with an acquaintance of Anna's named Major Brutt. Portia goes to Major Brutt's hotel and begs him to run away with her and to marry her. Major Brutt then calls Thomas and Anna to tell them where Portia is. The novel ends with Thomas and Anna sending their maid Matchett to Major Brutt's hotel in order to fetch Portia.

== Literary praise ==
The Death of the Heart has been named as one of the 100 best modern novels, both by Time and the Modern Library.

== Adaptation ==
The novel was adapted into a 1985 TV serial, starring Patricia Hodge and Miranda Richardson.
