= List of Irish women artists =

This is a list of women artists who were born in Ireland or whose artworks are closely associated with that country.

== A ==
- Anne Acheson (1882–1962), sculptor
- Mary Alment (1834–1908), landscape, portrait artist
- Mary Arrigan (born 1943), illustrator, artist and novelist

== B ==
- Ethelwyn Baker (1899–1988), sculptor
- Maude Mary Ball (1883–1969), painter and sculptor
- Ethel Gresley Ball (1886–1959), painter and sculptor
- Moyra Barry (1886–1960), flower painter
- Rose Maynard Barton (1856–1929), painter
- Mary Battersby (fl. 1801–1841), painter, naturalist
- Janie Beamish (1856–1930) landscape painter and etcher
- Frances Beckett (1880–1951), painter
- Edith Anna Bell (1870–1929), sculptor
- Dorothy Blackham (1896–1975), illustrator, painter, educator
- Edith Blake (1846–1926), botanical illustrator, writer
- Norma Borthwick (1862–1934), British artist, writer, Irish language activist
- Alicia Boyle (1908–1997), landscape artist
- Nicola Gordon Bowe (1948–2018), art historian, educator
- Gretta Bowen (1880–1981), painter
- Sarah Bowie (fl. 2010s), illustrator, author, cartoonist
- Muriel Brandt (1909–1981), painter
- Ruth Brandt (1936–1989), painter, educator
- Melanie Le Brocquy (1919–2018), sculptor
- Colleen Browning (1929–2003), realist painter
- Laura Buckley (1977–2022), video and installation artist
- Letitia Bushe (c. 1705/1710–1757), water painter, miniaturist
- Mildred Anne Butler (1885–1941), painter

== C ==
- Margaret Callan (c.1817–c.1883), teacher, nationalist, writer, used the pseudonym Thornton MacMahon
- Maeve Clancy, paper cut artist, illustrator
- Ellen Creathorne Clayton (1834–1900), painter
- Margaret Clarke (1888–1961), portrait painter
- Anne Cleary (born 1965), installation and video artist
- Eileen Coghlan (1909-1990) illustrator and painter
- Annie Colthurst (1855-1930) painter
- Susan Connolly (artist) (born 1976), contemporary artist
- Amanda Coogan (born 1971), performance artist
- Sylvia Cooke-Collis (1900–1973), painter
- Catherine Teresa Cookson (fl. 1830s), botanical artist
- Kathleen Cox (1904–1972), Irish artist, sculptor, mystic
- Mia Cranwill (1880–1972), designer, metal artist
- Dorothy Cross (born 1956), contemporary artist
- Amelia Curran (1775–1847), portrait painter
- Fanny Currey (1848–1917), horticulturalist and watercolour painter

== D ==
- Elinor Darwin (1879–1954), illustrator, engraver, portrait painter
- Lilian Davidson (1879–1954), painter, writer
- Kate Dobbin (1868–1955), watercolour artist
- Phoebe Donovan (1902–1998), flower, landscape and portrait artist
- Anne Donnelly (born 1932), painter
- Susanna Drury (1698–1770), landscape painter

== E ==
- Frances Anne Edgeworth (1769–1865), botanical artist, memoirist
- Diana Conyngham Ellis (1813–1851), botanical artist
- Beatrice Elvery (1881–1970), stained-glass artist, painter

== F ==
- Marianne Fannin (1845–1938), botanical artist
- Genieve Figgis (born 1972), contemporary painter
- Kathleen Fox (1880–1963), painter, enamellist, stained glass artist

== G ==
- Catherine Gage (1815–1892), botanist, botanical and ornithological illustrator
- Wilhelmina Geddes (1887–1955), stained glass artist
- Evelyn Gleeson (1855–1944), embroidery, carpet, and tapestry designer
- Carol Graham (born 1951), contemporary artist.
- Eileen Gray (1879–1976), furniture designer, architect
- Elizabeth Gray (1837–1903), painter, etcher, photographer
- Beatrice Gubbins (1878–1944), watercolour artist
- Althea Gyles (1868–1949), poet, painter, illustrator

== H ==
- Eva Henrietta Hamilton (1876–1960), painter
- Letitia Marion Hamilton (1878–1964), landscape painter
- Marianne-Caroline Hamilton (1777–1861), artist, memoirist
- Marie Hanlon (born 1948), painter
- Alice Hanratty (born 1939), printmaker
- Elayne Harrington (born 1987 or 1988), visual artist
- Sarah Cecilia Harrison (1863–1941), painter
- Gertrude Hartland (1865–1954), illustrator
- Gabriel Hayes (1909–1978), sculptor
- Mercedes Helnwein (born 1979), painter, writer, video artist
- Grace Henry (1868–1953), Scottish landscape artist
- Mary Balfour Herbert (1817–1893), watercolourist
- Katie Holten (born 1975), contemporary artist
- Helen Hooker (1905–1993), sculptor, portrait painter
- Evie Hone (1894–1955), painter, stained glass artist

== J ==
- Alice Jacob (1862–1921), botanical illustrator, lace designer, design teacher
- Joan Jameson (1892–1953), still-life, landscape and figure artist
- Yvonne Jammet (1900–1967), landscape painter, sculptor
- Mainie Jellett (1897–1944), painter
- Debbie Jenkinson, illustrator and comics artist
- Rachel Joynt (born 1966), sculptor

== K ==
- Harriet Kavanagh (1799–1885), artist, traveller, antiquarian
- Frances Kelly (1908–2002), painter
- Martha King (c.1803–1897), botanical artist
- Alice Sarah Kinkead (1871–1926), painter

== L ==
- Elish Lamont (c.1800/1816–1870), miniaturist
- Grania Langrishe (born 1934), botanical illustrator
- Lady Hazel Lavery (1880–1935), artist
- Mary Concepta Lynch (1874–1939), Irish nun and calligrapher

== M ==
- Gladys Maccabe (1918–2018), painter
- Isa Macnie (1869–1958), croquet champion, cartoonist, suffragist and activist
- Anne Madden (born 1932), painter
- Anne Magill, painter, illustrator
- Alice Maher (born 1956), multidisciplinary artist
- Mary Manning (1853–1930), landscape artist, teacher
- Sine MacKinnon (1901–1996), landscape artist
- Kathleen Marescaux (1868–1944), painter
- Sheila McClean (1932–2016), painter
- Siobhan McDonald, multidisciplinary artist
- Norah McGuinness (1901–1980), painter, illustrator
- Yvonne McGuinness (born 1972), contemporary artist
- Eva McKee (1890–1955), craftswoman and designer
- Flora Mitchell (1890–1973), American-born Irish artist
- Dorothy Molloy (1942–2004), poet and artist

== O ==
- Catherine Amelia O'Brien (1881–1963), stained glass artist
- Florence Vere O'Brien (1854–1936), diarist, philanthropist, craftswoman
- Geraldine O'Brien (1922–2014), botanical illustrator
- Kitty Wilmer O'Brien (1910–1983), landscape artist
- Nelly O'Brien (1864–1925), miniaturist, landscape artist, Gaelic League activist
- Harriet Osborne O'Hagan (1830–1921), portrait artist
- Helen Sophia O'Hara (1846–1920), watercolour artist
- Bea Orpen (1913–1980), landscape and portrait painter, teacher
- Catherine Isabella Osborne (1818–1880), artist, writer, patron

== P ==
- Aine Phillips (born 1965), performance artist, writer
- Ellice Pilkington (1869–1936), women's activist and artist
- Katherine Plunket (1820–1932), botanical illustrator
- Caroline Pounds (fl. 1840–1880), watercolour artist
- Rosamond Praeger (1867–1954), artist, sculptor, poet, writer
- Kathy Prendergast (born 1958), artist, sculptor
- Sarah Purser (1848–1943), stained glass artist

== R ==
- Mary Redmond (1863–1930), sculptor
- Nano Reid (1900–1981), painter
- Ethel Rhind (1877–1952), stained-glass and mosaic artist
- Anne Rigney (born 1957), abstract artist, sculptor
- Elizabeth Rivers (1903–1964), stained-glass, painter, engraver, illustrator
- Florence Ross (1870–1949), artist

== S ==
- Caroline Scally (1886–1973), landscape artist
- Susan Sex (born 1947), botanical artist
- Estella Solomons (1882–1968), painter
- Edith Somerville (1858–1949), writer, painter, illustrator, suffragist
- Elizabeth Shaw (1920–1992), illustrator, children's book author
- Everina Sinclair (1870–1966), woodworker and teacher
- Niamh Sharkey, author and illustrator of children’s picturebooks
- Camille Souter (1929–2023), painter
- Stella Steyn (1907–1987), painter, illustrator
- Sophia St John Whitty (1877–1924), woodcarver, teacher, cooperativist
- Imogen Stuart (1927–2024), German-Irish sculptor
- Mary Swanzy (1882–1978), landscape and genre artist
- Mary Rankin Swan (1865–1944), portrait artist

== T ==
- Phoebe Anna Traquair (1852–1936), illustrator, painter, embroiderer
- Helen Mabel Trevor (1831–1900), painter
- Alys Fane Trotter (1862–1961), poet, artist

== V ==
- Dairine Vanston (1903–1988), landscape artist
- Lilla Vanston (1870–1959), sculptor, portrait painter

== W ==
- Sophia Wellbeloved (born 1940), sculptor
- Sophia St John Whitty (1877–1924), woodcarver
- Daphne Wright (born 1963), visual artist
- Gladys Wynne (1876–1968), watercolourist

== Y ==
- Anne Yeats (1919–2001), painter, stage designer
- Lily Yeats (1866–1949), embroiderer
- Mabel Young (1889–1974), artist
