= Eileen O'Faolain =

Irish writer of children's books (1900–1988)

- Born: Eileen Gould; 10 June 1900; Cork, Ireland
- Died: 20 September 1988 (aged 88); St Vincent's Hospital, Dublin
- Occupation: children's writer

Eileen O'Faolain (10 June 1900 – 20 September 1988) was an Irish writer of children's books.

== Early life and family ==
Eileen O'Faolain was born Eileen Gould at 5 Lee Rd, Cork on 10 June 1900. Her parents were Joseph Gould, engineman, and Julia (née O'Connell). She had four siblings. Her mother died young, so O'Faolain and her siblings were raised by their maternal aunt at 4 Walls Terrace, Sunday's Well. She was educated locally and graduated from University College Cork (UCC) with a degree in economics in 1923. O'Faolain spent summer holidays in west Cork with Irish-speaking families and met Seán Ó Faoláin at an Irish language summer school at the Presentation Brothers College. When he followed her to Ballingeary, to an Irish summer school, they started a relationship. They attended UCC together, sharing mutual interests in literature and Irish cultural and republican movements. O'Faolain was an active member of Cumann na mBan during the Irish Civil War, acting as a courier, distributing an underground anti-treaty news sheet. She was arrested in February 1923, and was imprisoned for a number of months. She became disillusioned, believing that many of her fellow republicans were driven by "love for [their] own ruthless selves", which strained relations with Seán but he eventually came to the same conclusion.

O'Faolain taught in a national school in Ballinasloe, County Galway from 1923 to 1925, and then a technical school in Naas, County Kildare from 1925 to 1927. She then finally agreed to requests from Seán to join him in the United States while he was a Harvard postgraduate student from 1927 to 1929. Initially, they lived in a settlement house where she worked, later moving to 10 Appian Way, Cambridge where she took up secretarial work. They married on 3 June 1928 in Boston's Cathedral of the Holy Cross, spending their honeymoon camping across the United States for two months. The couple lived in London from 1929 to 1933, where she taught at a convent school in Isleworth teaching commercial subjects. When they returned to Ireland in 1933, Seán decided to become a full-time writer. They lived at Killough House, County Wicklow from 1933 to 1938, going on to build a house at Knockaderry, Killiney, County Dublin where they lived until 1971. It was here that she created a well-regarded garden. From 1971 to 1988 they lived at 17 Rosmeen Park, Dún Laoghaire, County Dublin. The couple had two children, Julia (born 1932) and Stephen (born 1938).

== Career ==
O'Faolain wrote a number of children's novels in the 1940s which were a critical success and widely read. Her books were illustrated by Nano Reid, Muriel Brandt, Nora McGuinness, Brian Wildsmith, and Eileen Coghlan. The little black hen (1940) was reworked into two books by Parkside Press children's series in 1945, The fairy hen and May Eve in fairyland. Each of O'Faolain's stories centre on a set of ordinary children, either set in rural or suburban Ireland, who set off on unexpected adventures and meet eccentric adults, animals and fairies. For her later books in the 1950s, she draws on Irish history, myth and legend, such as Irish sagas and folk-tales (1954), in which she retells the stories of the Tuatha Dé Danann. Children of the salmon and other Irish folktales (1965) features her translations of stories from Irish recordings by folklorists.

She suffered from near-chronic illness from the 1940s, with some of her ailments being psychosomatic or "stress-maladies" as her daughter characterised them, brought on by her husband's serial infidelities. She suffered from arthritis and stomach ulcers, and tried numerous diets and other fads in an attempt to relieve them. She travelled with her husband as he wrote travel pieces, and lived in the United States again while he was a visiting professor at Princeton University from 1959 to 1961. O'Faolain was admitted to St Vincent's Hospital, Dublin with recurring internal bleeding, where she died of a stroke on 20 September 1988. She left her body to Trinity College Dublin for medical research, with her ashes scattered at the lake of Gougane Barra, west Cork.

== Published works ==
- The little black hen (1940)
- The king of the cats (1941)
- Miss Pennyweather and the Pooka (1942)
- The children of Crooked Castle (1945)
- Miss Pennyweather in the springtime (1946)
- The shadowy man (1949)
- The white rabbit's road (1950)
- Irish sagas and folk-tales (1954)
- High sang the sword (1959)
- Children of the salmon and other Irish folktales (1965)
