= Maura Laverty =

Irish author, broadcaster, and journalist (1907–66)

- Laverty in 1963
- Born: May 15, 1907; Rathangan, Ireland
- Died: July 28, 1966 (aged 59); Dublin
- Occupations: Novelist, playwright, journalist, television presenter

Maura Laverty (née Kelly; 15 May 1907 – 28 July 1966) was an Irish novelist, playwright, journalist, broadcaster and cookery expert known for her work on the Irish television drama serial, Tolka Row. She published several novels, short stories and critical pieces throughout her career.

== Life ==
=== Family ===
Maura Laverty was born Maura Kelly into a farming family in Rathangan, County Kildare, on 15 May 1907. Her father Michael was a farmer and her mother Mary Ann was a dressmaker who had her own shop. She was educated at the Brigidine Convent in Tullow, County Carlow. She had intended to train to become a teacher, but she abandoned these plans after the death of her grandmother. She later moved to Spain in November 1924, taking up the position of governess and later secretary to Princess Bibesco and eventually becoming a journalist for the Madrid-based newspaper, El Debate. Laverty returned to Ireland for the remainder of her career and worked as a journalist and broadcaster in Dublin for the national radio station, Radio Éireann.

Upon her return to Ireland in 1928, she married the journalist James Laverty. They had three children: Maeve, James, and the artist Barry Castle, who illustrated some of her mother's work. By 1960, Maura and James had separated.

=== Activism ===
Laverty was committed to progressive causes, especially improving nutrition, eradicating tuberculosis, and public housing.

In the late 1940s, she was actively committed during her short time as a member of the Irish Republican political party Clann na Poblachta. She served on the party's executive and wrote the script for Ireland's first political campaign film, Our Country, for the 1948 elections.

== Career ==
=== Journalism ===
Maura Laverty was the editor for Woman's Life in 1936, and Ireland's first agony aunt for Woman's Way magazine in 1963. She also contributed regularly to author Seán Ó Faoláin's The Bell magazine. Ó Faoláin wrote the foreword to her first novel, Never No More. Laverty also published various articles and short stories in newspapers at home and abroad during her life.

As a radio broadcaster, she developed a varied and long career, culminating in a weekly programme sponsored by the Electricity Supply Board from 1955 until her death in 1966.

=== Cookery work ===
Laverty published multiple cookbooks, starting with the government-commissioned Flour Economy in 1942, designed to respond to the wartime shortage of flour. She then published Kind Cooking in 1946 (illustrated by her friend Louis le Brocquy) and the very popular Full and Plenty in 1960. Both contain short stories about food peppered in among the recipes, all stemming from the same country environment as her first novel, as well as practical recipes.

=== Novels ===
Her first novel Never No More was published to widespread acclaim in 1942. It was based in County Kildare, drawing heavily on personal experiences during her time in Derrymore House. It was the most popular novel in Ireland during most of the Emergency, the Second World War. Laverty followed this with Alone We Embark (1943), published in the United States as Touched by the Thorn (1943). The novels were favourites of writer Brendan Behan who wrote to Laverty from Arbour Hill Military Prison in 1944 to congratulate her on her first two novels, explaining that Never No More had been passed around the prison.

Her last three novels were banned in Ireland, including her third, the semi-autobiographical No More than Human, a sequel to her first novel, which apparently offended the censor because of its frankness about the female body. Her last novel Lift Up Your Gates (1946), published in the United States as Liffey Lane, was eventually adapted into her first play Liffey Lane (1951) for the Gate Theatre.

The fact that three-quarters of her books were banned in Ireland by the Censorship of Publications Board, despite being regarded as "as wholesome as homemade bread" elsewhere, can be considered indicative of the repressive nature of 1940's Ireland.

Laverty also wrote numerous children's stories including The Cottage in the Bog (1946) and The Green Orchard (1949). The latter became a textbook as part of the national curriculum in Ireland, and an English language textbook in schools in the Netherlands. The first edition of The Cottage in the Bog was illustrated by Eileen Coghlan.

=== Plays ===
The founders of the Gate Theatre in Dublin, Hilton Edwards and Micheál Mac Liammóir, had read and enjoyed Laverty's last novel Lift Up Your Gates, and Edwards suggested that she adapt it into a stage play. It was produced in 1951 and became a massive critical and commercial success. Laverty subsequently wrote two other plays for the Gate, Tolka Row and A Tree in the Crescent, in 1951 and 1952. Tolka Row was the biggest success out of the three: it was revived multiple times and produced by dozens of amateur companies throughout the decades; it is also mainly responsible for keeping the Gate Theatre financially afloat during the 1950s, although Laverty was often forced to chase Edwards and Mac Liammóir for payment for over a year, and she was never paid properly by them for her work, even though her plays were hits.

=== Television work ===
She was the writer of Telefís Éireann's Tolka Row, the new television station's first drama serial that ran between 1964 and 1968, adapted from her second play Tolka Row.

== Death and legacy ==
Laverty died on 28 July 1966 at her home in Dublin, as a result of coronary thrombosis. Her papers are deposited in the National Library of Ireland.

A biography, The Maura Laverty Story, by Seamus Kelly, was published in 2017.

A play based on her life, Maura Laverty–This Was Your Life, by Bairbre Ní Chaoimh and Yvonne Quinn premiered in Dublin in 2019.

== Selected works ==
=== Novels ===
- Never No More - ISBN 0872430138 (1942)
- Alone We Embark (1943), issued in the United States as Touched by the Thorn
- No More than Human (1944)
- Lift Up Your Gates (1946), issued in the United States as Liffey Lane

=== Children's books ===
- Gold of Glanaree (1945)
- The Cottage in the Bog (1946)
- The Green Orchard (1949)
- The Queen of Aran’s Daughter Publisher: Poolbeg Press; New Ed edition (13 March 1997), ISBN 1853717118, ISBN 978-1853717116

=== Plays ===
- Liffey Lane (1951)
- Tolka Row (1951)
- A Tree in the Crescent (1952)

=== Cookery ===
- Flour Economy (1941)
- Kind Cooking (1946)
- Maura Laverty’s Cookery Book (1948) A reprint of Kind Cooking, it was republished by Longman's UK
- Feasting Galore - Recipes and Food Lore from Ireland (1952) – published in the US
- Full and Plenty (1960) – published by the Irish Flour Millers Association

== Critical pieces ==
- Luke Gibbons, 'From Kitchen Sink to Soap; Drama and the Serial Form on Irish Television', in Transformations in Irish Culture (Cork UP 1996), pp. 44–69.
- Maura Laverty, 'Profile', RTÉ Guide, 13 May 1966, p.15; Gibbons, p.56.
- Never No More - Maura Laverty Remembered, RTÉ Radio 1 documentary broadcast on 18 June 2011.
