= Susan Connolly =

Susan Connolly may refer to:

- Susan E. Connolly, Irish fiction and non-fiction writer who has worked in comics, screenwriting, short fiction and novels
- Susan Connolly (poet) (born 1956), Irish poet
- Susan Connolly (artist) (born 1976), Irish artist
