= Eva McKee =

Irish craftswoman and designer

- Born: 28 July 1890; 32 Lothair Avenue, Belfast
- Died: 1955 (aged 64–65)
- Education: Belfast School of Art
- Known for: involvement in the Irish Decorative Art Association

Eva McKee (28 July 1890 – 1955) was an Irish craftswoman and designer, known for her involvement with the Irish Decorative Art Association. She was known for producing objects decorated with Celtic designs in a variety of media including leatherwork, jewellery, painted wood, embroidery, ceramics, repoussé metalwork, and block prints.

== Early life ==
Eva Kathleen McKee was born 28 July 1890, at 32 Lothair Avenue, Belfast. Her parents were James Henry McKee, a builder, and Jane McKee (née Grogan). She began working in the Irish Decorative Art Association (IDAA) in the 1910s, a Belfast craftworkers organisation and later a cooperative society founded by Mina Robinson. Whilst working in the IDAA she attended evening classes in the Belfast School of Art.

== Career ==
After World War I McKee helped in the revival of the IDAA with Eveline McCloy, working from the group's studio at 35 Wellington Place. McKee exhibited at the 6th exhibition of the Arts and Crafts Society of Ireland in Dublin and Cork in 1921, and became a members of the Guild of Irish Art-Workers in 1925. Throughout the 1920s her work featured in all the major Irish arts and crafts exhibitions. She won a medal at the 1922 Tailteann exhibition in Dublin for her decorative leatherwork and pottery. Both McKee and McCloy worked in a Celtic revival style, producing a large body of work in various media, which would become emblematic of the IDAA in the early 20th century.

McKee is seen as having the stronger artistic style, and created most of the studio's designs, particularly in pottery and coloured prints. She used factory made blanks from sources such as Belleek Pottery or Wedgwood, which she decorated with original Celtic designs in bright colours such as deep blue and yellow lustre. Items included jugs, bowls, and candlesticks as well as ceramic tiles and brooches. Prints produced by the IDAA included bookmarks, bookplates, greeting cards and calendars, featuring more Celtic designs with landscapes and fairy themes. These designs drew on traditional illustrated Irish manuscripts, and McKee signed them with her name in Irish: Aoife McAoda. Some of her designs which featured birds drew in elements from Art Nouveau.

McKee also drew up a large number of jewellery designs, which were then executed by local Belfast craftswomen. These designs feature interlace and spiral patterns of Celtic design mixed with the leafy tree motifs of the English arts and crafts movement. Among the items she designed were necklaces, earrings, pendants, and rings which had settings for enamel, ceramic or precious stones. McKee was also well known for her decorative leatherwork, also featuring Celtic design. One example is her book cover for a George William Russell volume of poetry, which was exhibited at the Tailteann exhibition in 1924. Both McKee and McCloy also created a variety of domestic items, utilising decorated woodwork, embroidery, enamelling, and repoussé metalwork. By the 1920s, McKee had a retail space in Belfast, which appeared to continue to trade until the 1960s.

== Later life ==
From 1933, McKee and McCloy stopped using the IDAA, a name which was exclusively associated with their work by this time. The pair moved their studio to Donegall Place and continued their partnership into the 1950s. McKee died in Belfast in 1955. A large collection of her work is held in the Linen Hall Library, Belfast, and the John J. Burns Library in the Boston College where her work has been exhibited.
