= Valentine Ball =

Irish scientist (1843–1895)

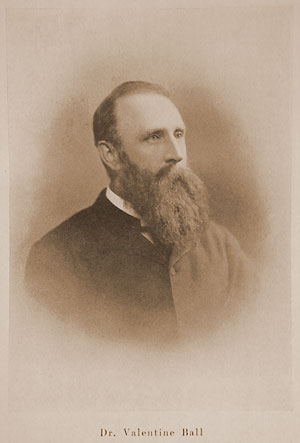
- Born: 14 July 1843; Dublin, Ireland
- Died: 15 June 1895 (aged 51); Dublin

Valentine Ball (14 July 1843 – 15 June 1895) was an Irish geologist, son of Robert Ball (1802–1857) and a brother of Sir Robert Ball. Ball worked in the Geological Survey of India for twenty years before returning to take up a position in Ireland.

== Early life and family ==
Valentine was born in Dublin, the second son of Robert Ball and Amelia Gresley Hellicar. His siblings included Robert Stawell Ball, sisters Mary Agnetta (d. 1868), Amelia Charlotte (d. 1912), Annie Francis and surgeon Sir Charles Ball. He received his early education at Chester and later at the private schools of Dr Henry and Dr Benson at Dublin. He then went to the University of Dublin obtaining a B.A. in 1864, M.A. in 1872 and LL.D. in 1889.

Ball married Mary, the eldest daughter of John Stewart Moore, of Moyarget, Antrim in 1879. They had two daughters, Maude Mary Ball and Ethel Gresley Ball, who became artists while their only son Robert Gordon served in the West African army medical staff and was invalided in Togo.

Ball died on 15 June 1895, having lived at 28 Waterloo Road since 1881. He was buried in Mount Jerome cemetery near the grave of his brother, Charles.

== Career ==
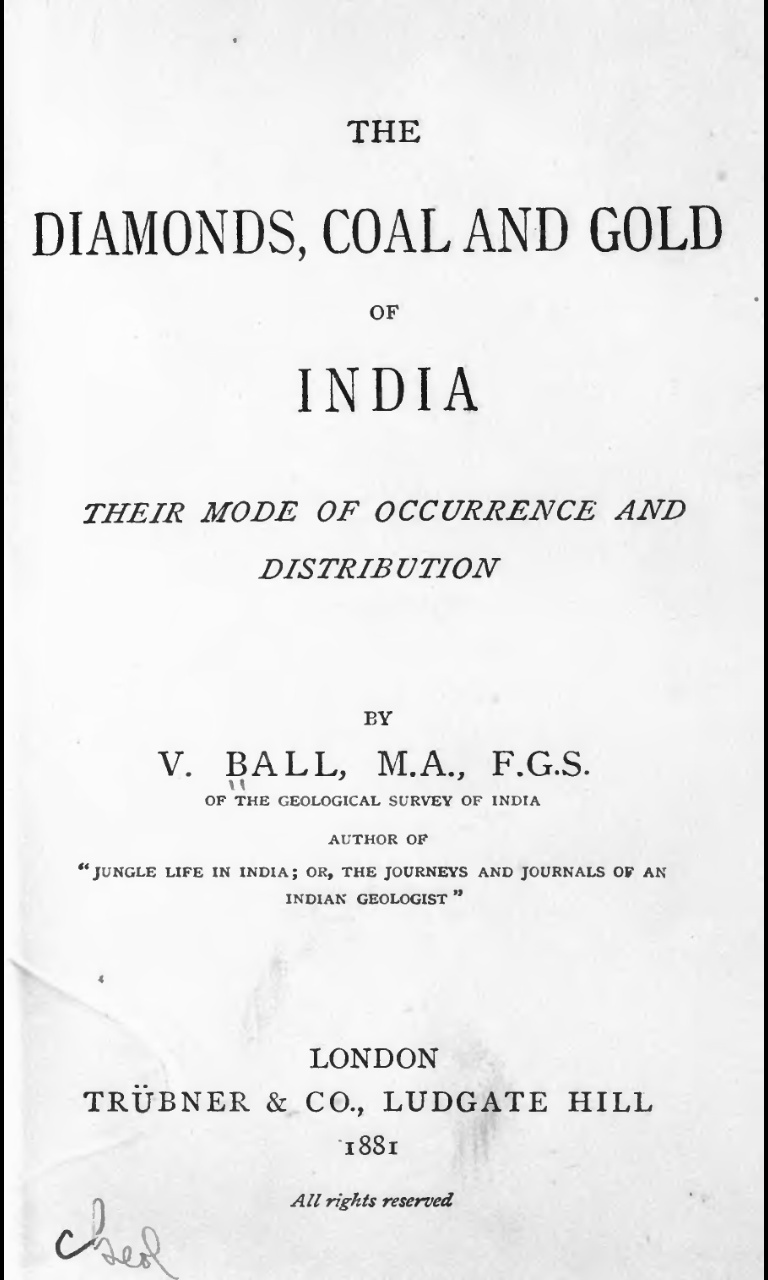

Having worked for 4 years as a clerk in the Four Courts, Ball joined the Geological Survey of India in 1864. He initially worked under Thomas Oldham, and was tasked with surveying coalfields and other minerals of economic value, discovering a number of coalfields in west Bengal and central India. He was made a Fellow of the Calcutta University in 1875. His expertise on central India led to his advice being sought for the alignment of a proposed railway line between Bombay and Calcutta. He was also among the early scientists who visited Narcondam Island in 1873 along with James Wood-Mason. He was elected Fellow of the Geological Society of London in 1874.

Returning to Ireland in 1881, he became professor of geology and mineralogy at the University of Dublin, succeeding Samuel Haughton. In 1883 he became director of the Dublin Science and Art Museum, now the National Museum of Ireland. He was the president of the Royal Geological Society from 1882 to 1883 and served as the honorary secretary of the Royal Zoological Society of Ireland. He was elected to the Royal Society in 1882. As director of the museum, Ball oversaw the completion of the new museum complex on Kildare Street, and produced the first guide to the building. He also contributed to studies in ornithology and anthropology, arranging for his collections of Irish antiquities and Polynesian artifacts previously held in the Royal Irish Academy and Trinity College Dublin to be deposited in the new museum. Ball resigned from the directorship of the museum in 1895 due to ill-health.

Ball was a regular contributor to Stray Feathers, the ornithological journal founded by Allan Octavian Hume. The Andaman scops owl (Otus balli) was named after him by Hume. When collecting bird specimens, he routinely examined the stomach contents and wrote on their diet and habits. His writings included Jungle-Life in India (1880), The Diamonds, Coal, and Gold of India (1881), The Economic Geology of India (1881) and numerous notes to the journals. A list of 62 of his publications was included as an appendix to his book Jungle Life in India. A translation of Tavernier's Travels in India (1889) was published posthumously by his widow.

The National Museum of Ireland holds his collections along with a marble bust of Ball. The National Botanic Gardens hold his collection of Indian lichens, and his letters are held at Kew Gardens.

== Publications ==
- Ball, V. 1874. On the avifauna of the Chutia, Nagpur Division S. W. frontier of Bengal. Stray Feathers 2: 355-440.
- Ball, V. 1877. Notes on birds observed in the region between Mahanadi and Godavari rivers. Stray Feathers 5: 410-420
- Ball, V. 1878. From Ganges to the Godaveri, on the distribution of birds. Stray Feathers 7:191-235.
- Ball, Valentine (1880). Jungle life in India. Thomas de la Rue & Co. London.
- Ball, V. 1881. The Diamonds, Coal and Gold of India.
- Ball, V. 1885. On the identification of the animals and plants of India which were known to early Greek authors. The Indian Antiquary. 14:274-287, 303-311, 334-341.
- Posthumously published translation of Tavernier's writings Travels in India (1889). Volume IVolume II
