= Philip and Barry Castle =

Irish artists duo

Philip and Barry Castle were British and Irish artists. They are considered a pair, as they are in the National Irish Visual Arts Library catalogue, as they worked and exhibited together and shared a painting technique that Philip taught Barry, which concentrated on making the colour look luminous. The Irish Times said of their partnership that "As husband and wife they have lived together a long time, but their artistic partnership spans almost as many years." They use the quattrocento style, building up the painting layer by layer.

== Philip Castle ==
Philip Castle was born in 1929 in the south of England, into a family of engineers. He attended Haberdashers Aske School in London and went on in 1954 to read nuclear physics at Trinity College Dublin where he studied under Ernest Walton, the Nobel Laureate. He met his wife, Barry Laverty, when studying in Dublin and they married in 1963.

After university Philip decided against a career as a nuclear physicist and instead became a painter. The Bank of Ireland Arts Centre and Lavit Gallery records describe Philip Castle as self-taught. Barry told the Irish times that Philip never had any formal art training. 'He taught himself and then he taught me - even though I had been to art school."

When Barry and Philip were first married they spent many months sailing around the Mediterranean, in search of the right light. Subsequently, they lived in a small villa within a carnation farm, overlooking the sea at Villefranche-sur-mer in the South of France. They also spent time in a small house in Gaiole in Chianti, Italy. However, they kept their links to Ireland and owned a small coach house off Grafton Street in Dublin.

Philip's work is catalogued as relating to the built environment. He was much influenced by early Italian Primitive painters, Duccio and Cimabue. He painted huge canvasses in clear pure colours, stippling the paint to create a smooth surface. His city-scapes often included material from the lives of Saints, Popes and historical events. He painted the Italian mediaeval: the Pallio in Siena, Venice and (later in his career) contemporary cities, New York and London. His art connected these interests, finding Florentine lines in the early New York buildings.

Philip and Barry had separate but adjacent studios in Italy and France. They exhibited separately and together (see Exhibitions, below.) Their techniques were similar but their styles were distinguishable. The Irish Times interviewed them in 1999 and they discussed their differences. "I'm interested in what men build and do, rather than in men themselves. What you build is a way of expressing yourself," Philip said. Barry said her approach " has more to do with intuition and emotion and less to do with the intellect, the intellectual being more important to Philip's way of working. Barry's paintings are full of natural and organic forms, quite different concerns to the cityscapes and urban complexities of her husband's canvasses".

Philip sold mostly directly. Rainier III, Prince of Monaco once bought an entire exhibition and the Royal College of Surgeons in Dublin also bought directly from Philip.

Philip Castle died in 2005.

== Barry Castle ==
Barry Laverty, christened Finbar, was born in Dublin in May 1935. Barry was the daughter of the writer and playwright, foreign correspondent and cook Maura Laverty(1907 – 1966) Barry illustrated some of her mother's work, notably The Queen of Aran's Daughter, 1995 and "The Cottage in the Bog", 1992. Her father was the Irish Times journalist, James Laverty.

She attended several schools, including the "gloomy" Holy Faith Convent on Haddington Road, St Louis in Rathmines and, she related, a school under Dr Teller where for two years she kept her coat on in class because no one told her where to hang it up and Loreto Abbey.

Barry attended Dublin Art School at the age of 15 "because I wouldn't go to school" but left after only two years, not really painting again until she was encouraged and taught by Philip Castle. Her teachers included Sean Keating, Maurice MacGonigal and John Kelly. At art school Barry met her lifelong friend, the acclaimed Irish artist Pauline Bewick, ( who also bought a house near the Castle's, in Tuscany) and the RHA president, Tom Ryan.

Her use of Philip's luminous technique was noted in her obituary in the Irish Times which noted the graphic clarity and translucent colouring of her were suited to illustration. She illustrated several books, including one, Cooking for Cats (1985), for which she herself provided the verse text.

Barry had her first major exhibition with London’s Portal Gallery in 1974. Her work can be found in such collections as The National Library of Ireland, The National Self-Portrait Collection in Limerick, University of Limerick, AIB and The Arts Council of Ireland.

Barry mainly painted a combination of landscapes and portraits; sometimes using incidents from the lives of eccentric saints or mythological subjects. For example, she painted her friend, the writer Jillian Becker. Her paintings were also commissioned by publishers for use in children’s books. She also designed postage stamps for the republic of Ireland Barry Castle died in Dublin in August 2006.

== Barry and Philip's Exhibitions ==
- Philip Castle first exhibited with the celebrated Portal Gallery in 1969, (also home to Beryl Cook), having previously exhibited at the Arthur Jeffress Gallery and with the Australian art dealer Clytie Jessop. Philip exhibited alone with the Portal Gallery in 1973 and Barry exhibited again in 1974 and 1979 and the exhibited together in 1998
- Barry exhibited with the Royal Hibernian Academy.
- In 1972 Barry exhibited alone at Oireachtas, the national parliament, Dublin.
- Philip Castle first showed with the celebrated Portal Gallery in 1969, (also home to Beryl Cook), having previously exhibited at the Arthur Jeffress Gallery and with the Australian art dealer Clytie Jessop. Philip exhibited alone with the Portal Gallery in 1973 and Barry exhibited again in 1974 and 1979 and the exhibited together in 1998.
- Philip and Barry exhibited together at the Hilde Gerst gallery on Worth Ave, Palm Beach in February 1977.
- Barry exhibited in 1989 at the National Portrait Exhibition, Arnotts.
- Barry exhibited in 1991 at the RHA Banquet Show. Barry exhibited at the Cork Arts Society since 1986 (including their Thirtieth Anniversary Exhibition)
- Barry and Philip had a joint exhibition at the Pantheon Gallery, Eire, 1995.
- Barry and Philip had a joint exhibition at the Portal Gallery on 5 November 1996, opened by the Irish ambassador, Ted Barrington.
- In 1995, 1996, 1998, 1999, 2000, 2002, 2003 and 2004 they exhibited at the Lavit Gallery in Cork.
- Barry and Philip had a joint exhibition in November 1999 at the Bank of Ireland Arts Centre, "Perspectives and Retrospectives, Barry and Philip Castle", opened by John Rocha.
- Barry Castle and Philip Castle had a major retrospective in Dublin at Trinity College.
- Barry's work is part of public collections in the University of Limerick Bourn Vincent Gallery and the Allied Irish Bank public collection. Barry and Philip also both exhibited in group Portal Gallery exhibitions in New York at the Wally Findlay Galleries, in Chicago at Portals, and at the Ikon Gallery in Birmingham. Both have exhibited at the Bourn Vincent Gallery at the University of Limerick.
- Barry Castle exhibited at the Solomon Gallery in Dublin

== Bibliography, filmography, prizes and publications ==
- Barry was the subject of a book, "Retrospective - 1968-1998" by Frances Ruane, Pat Donlon, Pauline Bewick, Clare Boylan, Sarah Finlay, Thomas Ryan", ASIN B002K61U9C.
- Philip and Barry are both in the book "Portal Painters: Survey of British Primitive Fantasists" by Eric Lister. ISBN 9780933516533; also "Barry Castle, Philip Castle: 27 paintings", 1980.
- In 1995 Barry won the James Adam Salesroom Award.
- A film ‘ Life without Shadows’ was made about their work by David Shaw Smith and RTE in 1985.
- 'Barry and Philip Castle Paintings', 1979, Portal Gallery, London
- Dunne, Aidan, 'Painting Castles in Tuscany.' Social and Personal, August 1995, pp74.
- The Combridge Gallery Award for a work of exceptional merit in watercolour went to Barry Castle
- Irish Arts Review Yearbook, Vol. 18 (2002), pp. XXXVII-XLVII, published by Irish Arts Review

== Illustrated Books (Barry) ==
- "Cooking for Cats" published by Methuen 1985, ISBN 9780416520002
- "Cry Wolf and other Aesop’s Fables" published by Oxford University Press in 1988. Text by Naomi Lewis, ISBN 978-0416000429.

Barry also illustrated children’s stories by her mother, Maura Laverty:

- "The Queen of Aran’s Daughter" published by Poolbeg Press, Dublin in 1995, (ISBN 978-1853717116) and
- "The Cottage in the Bog", also published by Poolbeg Press Ltd, 1992 (ISBN 978-0948524448).
