= Julia O'Faolain =

Irish writer (1932–2020)

Julia O'Faolain (6 June 1932 – 27 October 2020) was an Irish novelist and short story writer.

== Early life and education ==
O'Faolain's parents were Irish writers Seán Ó Faoláin and Eileen Gould. She was educated at University College Dublin, Sapienza University of Rome and the Sorbonne Paris. She worked as a writer, language teacher, editor and translator and lived in France, Italy, and the United States.

== Writing career ==
Her novels include

- Godded and Codded (1970)
- Women In The Wall (1973)
- No Country for Young Men (1980)
- The Obedient Wife (1982)
- The Irish Signorina (1984)
- The Judas Cloth (1992)
- Adam Gould (2009)

Her short story collections include We Might See Sights! (1968), Man in the Cellar (1974), Melancholy Baby (1978) and Daughters of Passion (1982). As Julia Martines, she translated Two Memoirs of Renaissance Florence: The Diaries of Buonaccorso Pitti and Gregorio Dati and Piero Chiara's A Man of Parts. Her No Country for Young Men was shortlisted for the 1980 Booker Prize.

She lived in Los Angeles, where she was married to a historian of the Renaissance, Lauro Martines (1927–2026). They had one son. With her husband, she co-edited Not in God's Image: Women in History from the Greeks to the Victorians (1973).

O'Faolain writes about women's roles in society, power, faith and sexuality, and about Irish dilemmas of female identity. Women in the Wall (1975) is a history of Saint Radegund, who in the sixth century founded a monastery in Gaul. With her husband, O'Faolain edited Not in God's Image: Women in History from the Greeks to the Victorians (1973), and has just produced a new novel, Adam Gould, which is set in a lunatic asylum. Although it's her first book in 17 years, it explores familiar themes: clerical intrigue, family history and farce, with madness added to the mix. 'I like fiction to be a Trojan horse,' she says. 'It can seem to be engineering an escape from alien realities, but its true aim is to slip inside them and get their measure.

— Christopher Fowler, Forgotten authors No. 41: Julia O'Faolain, The Independent on Sunday

O'Faolain died on 27 October 2020, aged 88.

== Reviews ==
- Watson, George (1980), review of No Country for Young Men, in Cencrastus No. 4, Winter 1980–81, p. 48, ISSN 0264-0856
