= Alice Macallan Swan =

British artist (1864–1939)

Alice Macallan Swan R.W.S.
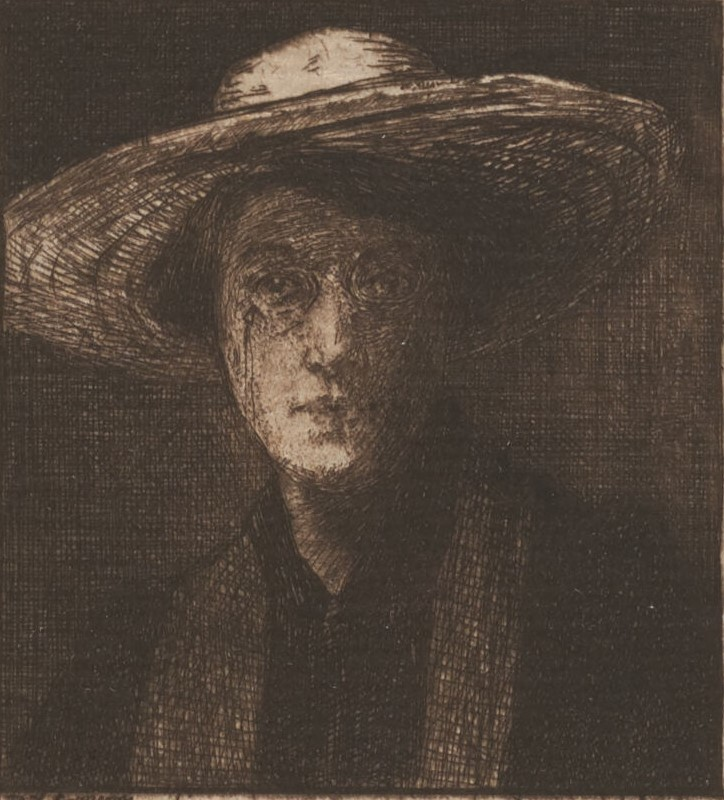
- Born: 1864; Worcester, England
- Died: January 1939 (aged 74–75); London, England
- Occupation: Painter
- Organization: Royal Watercolour Society
- Relatives: John Macallan Swan (brother)

Alice Macallan Swan, R.W.S. (1864– 28 January 1939) was a British artist and a well-known painter of landscapes and other subjects, mostly in watercolour.

== Early life ==
Alice Macallan Swan was born in Worcester, the daughter of Robert Wemyss Swan and Elizabeth Macallan. She was the sister of John Macallan Swan and was raised in an artistic atmosphere. She began painting while still a child and was tutored by her brother.

== Career ==
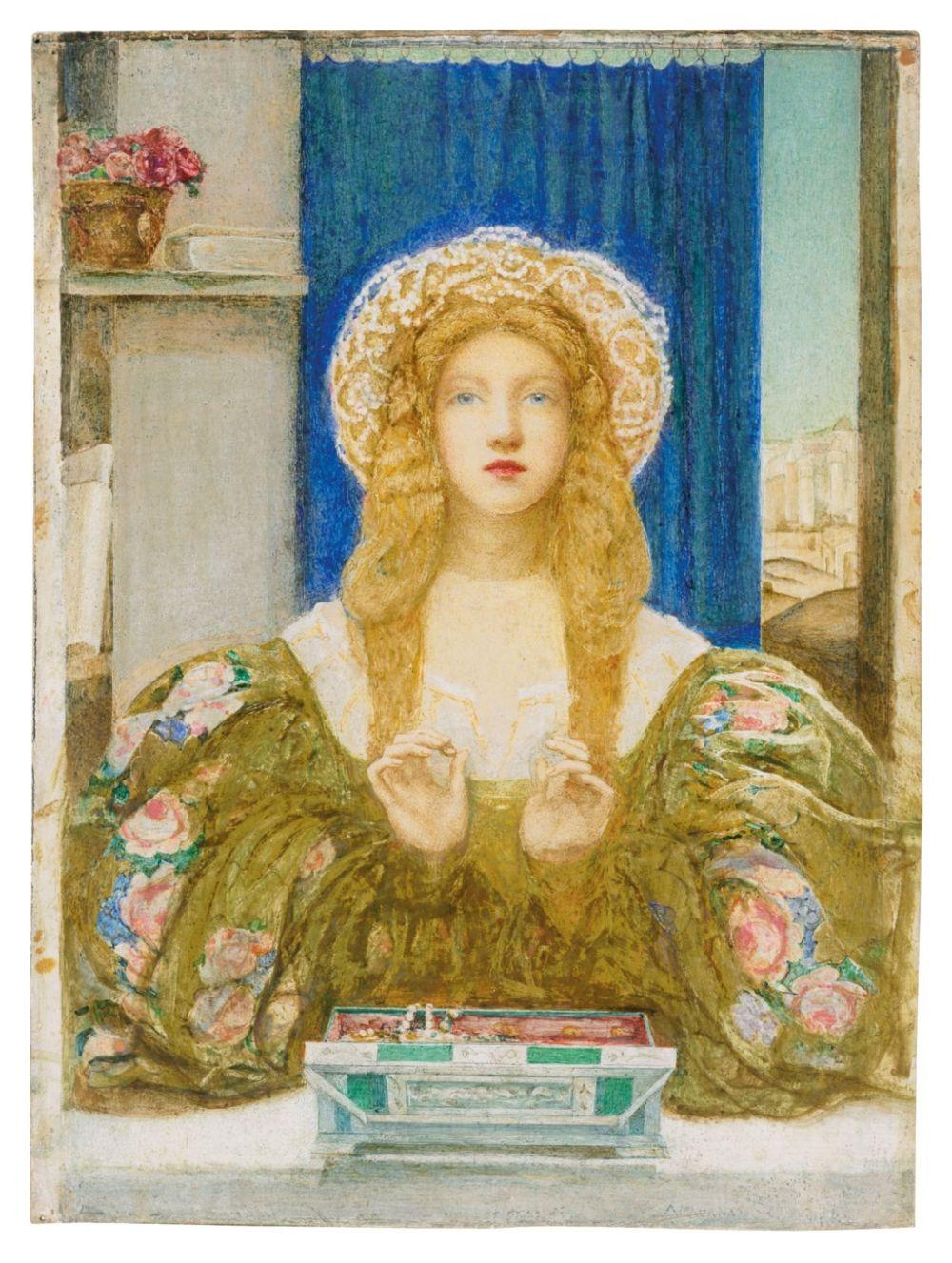
A painting by Alice Macallan Swan

Swan became best known for still-life and flower paintings. She exhibited at the Royal Academy between 1882 and 1898. In 1903, she was elected an Associate of the Royal Society of Painters in Water Colours. Swan was actively involved in the Society, including as a committee member of the Royal Water Colour Society Art Club. She also took part in the judging and hanging of exhibitions. Following her death, The Times suggested that she may have been the first woman member of the Society. However, this was Anne Byrne.

In 1923, Swan was commissioned to paint a watercolour of St Paul's Cathedral from Waterloo Bridge for Queen Mary's Dolls' House, now in the Royal Collection Trust.

The Times described Swan's work as:

remarkable as much for its complete translation of the facts of nature into values of colour as for its charm of sentiment. It was only in matters of execution that she was, so to speak, old fashioned. Whistler thought very highly of her work, and it is said that he tried for years to persuade her to sell him her "Harmony in Yellow and Gold," an early work which was included in the last exhibition of the Royal Society of Painters in Water Colours in November, 1938. Miss Swan... excelled in autumn landscapes of a wistful kind, and it was said that in them she seemed to convey the very fragrance of the season.

A writer for The Connoisseur wrote that Swan was an "artist who exhausts the resources of her palette in attaining strength of tone":

Her Jade Lotus Ship, painted in strident greens, reds, blues, and blacks, compels attention, and her dexterity in combining the colours together into a harmonious and homogeneous composition is commendable, but the effect is not restful.

== Death ==
Alice Macallan Swan died at her Kensington studio on 28 January 1939, aged 75. At the time of her death, a half-finished painting of a bowl of flowers was on her easel. Her Times obituary described her as "an excellent painter in watercolours in the somewhat laboured manner of an earlier generation".

Artist and zoologist Guy Dollman wrote:

Miss Alice Macallan Swan leaves an empty chair in artistic circles which will not be easily filled... The first thing one noticed about Alice Swan was her good nature, passing through life without a trace of artistic jealousy. She was a woman of great heart and willing on all occasions to assist and encourage those who sought her aid.
