= Sophia St John Whitty =

Irish woodcarver, teacher, and cooperativist

- Born: 4 November 1877; Upper Leeson Street, Dublin, Ireland
- Died: 26 February 1924 (aged 46); Drumcondra Hospital, Dublin
- Education: South Kensington School of Art, Dublin Metropolitan School of Art
- Known for: wood carving

Sophia St John Whitty (4 November 1877 – 26 February 1924) was an Irish woodcarver, teacher, and cooperativist. Whitty was part of the Irish Celtic cultural revival and the Irish Art and Crafts movement.

== Early life and education ==
Sophia St John Whitty was born at 69 Upper Leeson Street, Dublin on 4 November 1877. Her parents were Richard Lawrence Whitty and Jane Alicia, the daughter of Hugh Palliser Hickman of Fenloe house, Newmarket-on-Fergus, County Clare. Richard Lawrence Whitty was an active freemason, who served as an assistant secretary of the Dublin Masonic orphan schools from 1876 to 1882, and worshipful master of the grand master's lodge in 1882. The stained-glass artist Catherine Amelia O’Brien was her first cousin. The Whittys lived at Hillcot, Whitechurch, County Dublin near the Dublin mountains in the 1880s, and Whitty would spend her holidays at Fenloe House with the Hickman family. Whitty attended the South Kensington School of Art to study wood carving, continuing her studies at the Dublin Metropolitan School of Art.

== Artistic career ==
Around 1902, Whitty opened a small studio at 43 Sackville Street. Whitty and her sister Dorothy gave lessons in wood carving and other crafts there. She joined Kathleen A. Scott in teaching wood carving at the parochial hall of Christ Church, Bray in 1902. She went to Bruges, Belgium to study figure carving, and after this she visited art sites and schools of carving in Austria and Italy during the summer of 1903. When a new technical school opened in Bray in 1904, Whitty was appointed wood carving teacher, one of the first in Ireland, incorporating her extant carving class into it. Assisted by Scott, the class executed carved walnut woodwork of Christ Church which was designed by Whitty. These two neo-Gothic pieces included figures carved by Whitty, including angels and St Patrick.

Whitty and her students created church and domestic furniture, and were exhibited at a number of venues. Her 1904 Gothic triptych with crucifix received acclaim. At the 1904 Louisiana Purchase Exposition, Whitty contributed examples of leather crafting to the Irish crafts display. Due to the success of the carving class and the volume of orders received, led to Whitty forming a cooperative society in 1905. This society, the Bray Art Furniture Industry, was attached to the technical school, and Whitty acted as manager, designer, and instructor. It received grants for the Department of Agriculture and Technical Instruction for Ireland and was able to employ 12 full-time and up to 50 part-time workers and opened a shop on Bray's Main Street in 1907. Through the society, apprentices were trained in every aspect of wood working, emphasising the use of the highest standard of materials, design, and execution. In 1906, Whitty closed her Dublin studio, and in 1909 she moved from 70 Pembroke Road to Old Bawn, Old Connaught, Bray. She and her mother would live there for the rest of her life. Whitty was nominated to the council of the newly reformed Arts and Crafts Society of Ireland in 1909, and was among the 13 professional artists enrolled into the Guild of Irish Art Workers. After the outbreak of World War I there was a sharp decline in orders and a number of cancellations of outstanding commissions. This resulted in the closure of the Bray Art Furniture Industry in 1914. Although the society was short-lived, it spurred a revival of wood carving in Ireland in association with the contemporary arts and crafts movement.

Whitty was involved in the United Irishwomen, serving as the organising secretary in 1914, 1915 and 1921. The organisation struggled during the political troubles of the Irish Civil War, Whitty resigned her post in 1921. After this she wrote a number of nature articles for various Dublin newspapers. She toured Counties Dublin and Wicklow searching for material, travelling alone by bicycle or with her mother in their car.

== Later life and legacy ==
Whitty died of heart failure after a brief illness and surgery, in Drumcondra Hospital, Dublin, on 26 February 1924. A number of the former Bray wood workers carved the organ case for Christ Church, Bray in her memory in 1924. She developed an interest in the Irish language and literature, demonstrated by an undated monograph, Sea paradises of the Irish imrama. After her death, a collection of her nature essays were published posthumously, The flaming wheel (1924), which included a biographical foreword by Scott. The essays included her observations of animals, plants and birds from her field trips on her own, with her mother and in her youth. The essays are arranged into the 12 calendar months and also include elements of folklore and anecdotes related to Irish flora and fauna.
