= Mina Robinson =

Irish artist (1890–1910)

- Born: Ireland
- Known for: founded the Irish Decorative Art Association

Mina Robinson (fl. 1890 – 1910) was an Irish artist and founder of the Irish Decorative Art Association.

== Life ==
Mina Robinson was most likely born in Belfast, though nothing is known about her early life. From the early 1890s Robinson starts holding art classes from her home in Cliftonville, and then from 1894 from the Garfield Chambers. The classes were known as the Belfast school of pokerwork, and from these classed the Irish Decorative Art Association was created by Robinson and Eta Lowry.

== Irish Decorative Art Association ==
The original purpose of the Association was to promote their work as well as their fellow artists. In July 1894 the group held their first exhibition at Portrush, which became an annual event. This initial exhibition was praised by the Belfast News Letter. Robinson exhibited pokerwork design and a 17th century style chest, with Lowry exhibiting art needlework. In 1895 at the Belfast Art and Industrial Exhibition, Robinson exhibited a decorated oak settle. It is most likely the same piece that she later exhibits at the Arts and Crafts Society of Ireland exhibition in Dublin in the same year. It has been concluded that a settle which is now in the collections of the Ulster Folk and Transport Museum is probably this piece.

Over time the school's scope broadened, with members showing chairs, panels, mantelpieces, music stands and friezes. In the early years, the pieces showed strong influence from Art Nouveau, but from the 1890s more Celtic patterns appear. Some of pieces from the 1903 show were purchased by the group's patron Lady Londonderry for her estate at Mount Stewart, County Down. The group's success continued, moving from Garfield Chambers to Wellington Place by 1910. After this point, no more is known about Robinson's life.
