= Ethel Gresley Ball =

Irish artist

- Born: 24 November 1886; Dublin
- Died: 3 July 1959 (aged 72); Dublin

Ethel Gresley Ball (24 November 1886 – 3 July 1959), was an Irish artist working in both paintings and sculpture. She is best known for her studies of animals at the Royal Zoological Gardens, Dublin.

== Life ==
Ethel Gresley Ball was born on 24 November 1886 to Valentine Ball and his wife Gresley Stewart-Moore in Dublin. Her father was a geologist and Director at Science and Art Museum in Dublin. She was an artist who was a member of the Royal Dublin Society and the Royal Zoological Society of Ireland. Her older sister Maude Mary Ball was also an artist. Ball studied under Oliver Sheppard at the RHA Schools and at the Dublin Metropolitan School of Art.

Ball exhibited annually at Royal Hibernian Academy (RHA) Exhibitions from 1917, showing over 50 pieces cumulatively. In 1922, along with her sister Maude and Dorothy FitzGerald, Ball exhibited works at Mills' Hall, Merrion Row, Dublin. She was also featured at the Exhibition of the Royal Scottish Academy of Painting, Sculpture and Architecture in 1940, in Belfast and at the Royal National Eisteddfod of Wales. The National Museum of Ireland purchased a bronze she completed of a 'Great Irish Deer, formerly known as "Irish Elk" ' in 1927, which had been exhibited at Mills' Hall in 1930. Her last exhibited piece with the RHA was in 1940, Zoo Babies at Play.

She died on 3 July 1959. Dublin Zoo hold three pieces of sculpture by her.

== Works ==
- Mother - Portrait Bust
- Meditation
- Miss Florence Gifford
- Statuette -1917
- Spring - Statuette, 1918
- The New Penny, 1919
- Boy's Head, 1920
- Woman's Head, 1921*
- Miss May Crosbie, 1921 (Circa)
- Lion Finn, 1922*
- Chimpanzee Companions, 1923*
- Chimpanzee Companions, 1923*
- Head of an Old Man, 1924*
- Young Lion - Selim Bey, 1924*
- Caracal, 1925*
- Arabian Baboon, 1925*
- Lynx on Guard, 1925
- Chimpanzee, 1925
- Italian Workman, 1926*
- Baboon Sentry, 1926*
- Snarling Leopard, 1926*
- Lion Cubs, Dathi, Cormac and Aoife, born in Dublin, 1926*
- Lion's Head, 1926
- Leopard, 1926
- Young Tigers, 1927*
- A Little Mischief, 1927*
- A Fishy Meal, 1928*
- The Favourite, 1928*
- The Old Macaw, 1928*
- Young Lions, 1929*
- The Beggar, 1929*
- Mary Devenport O'Neill, 1929*
- Play, 1929*
- Leopard Set, 1930*
- Young Primates - Orang and Chimpanzee, 1931*
- My Kill, 1931*
- Lion Cub, 1931*
- 'A Wise Old Bird was She', 1931*
- Dainty, 1932*
- Ostrich, 1932*
- Young Lion Cubs Settling Down, 1932*
- The Three Sisters, 1932*
- Old Jack the Ratter, 1932*
- The Beggar, 1934*
- Young Donkey Foal, 1934*
- A Young Family, 1934*
- Lion Cubs (The Snuggling Stage), 1934*
- Head of Lioness, 1934*
- Lion, Finn, 1935*
- Donkey Foal, 1935*
- The Twins, 1935*
- Baedan, Bricriu, Breas, Branach and Blanaid, 1935*
- Chimpanzee and Her Baby, 1937*
- Shetland Pony, 1937*
- 'Jackie' - Donkey Foal, 1937*
- Golden Cat Sharpening her Claws, 1938*

Dates marked * are usually the year a work was exhibited.

== Sources ==
- "Person Page". The Peerage. 22 September 2004.
- "Miss Ethel Gresley Ball". Mapping the Practice and Profession of Sculpture in Britain and Ireland 1851-1951.
- "BALL Ethel Gresley". National Irish Visual Arts Libraries.
