= John Macallan Swan =

English painter (1846–1910)

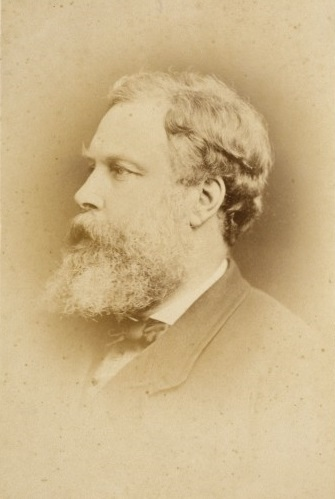
Portrait of John Macallan Swan

John Macallan Swan RA (9 December 1846 – 14 February 1910) was an English painter and sculptor.

== Biography ==
Swan was born in Brentford, Middlesex, on 9 December 1846. His younger sister, Alice Macallan Swan, also became an artist. He received his art training first in England at the Worcester and Lambeth schools of art and the Royal Academy Schools, and subsequently in Paris, in the studios of Jean-Léon Gérôme and Emmanuel Frémiet. He began to exhibit at the Academy in 1878. His picture The Prodigal Son, bought for the Chantrey collection in 1889 (and now in the Tate Britain), established his reputation as an artist. He married artist Mary Rankin Swan in Ireland in 1884 and had two children with her, including sculptor Mary Alice Swan.

He was elected associate in the Royal Academy in 1894 and academician in 1905. He was appointed a member of the Dutch Water-Colour Society in 1885; and associate of the Royal Society of Painters in Water Colours in 1896 and full member in 1899. He was awarded first class gold medals for painting and sculpture in the Paris Exhibition, 1900.

== Work ==
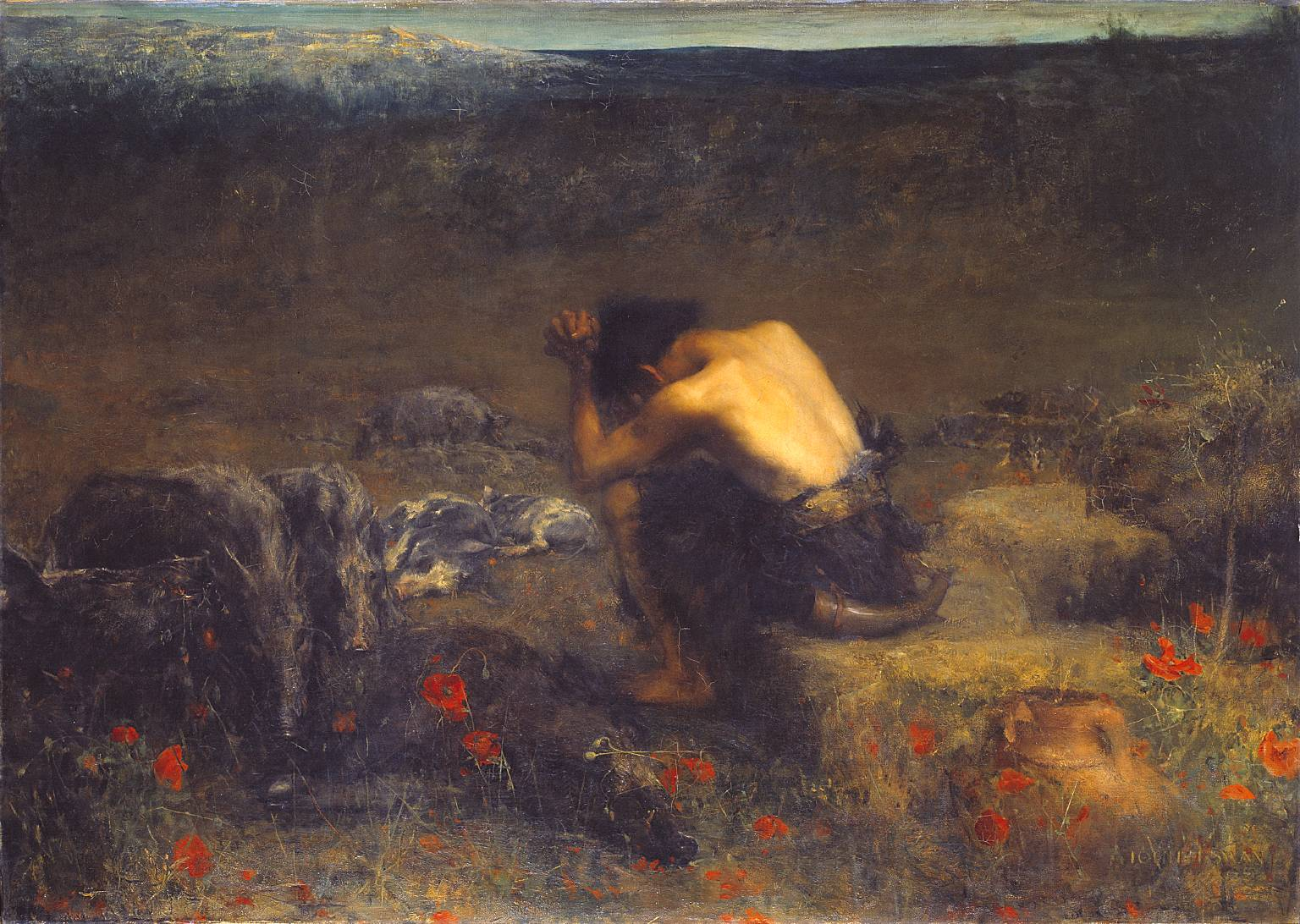
The Prodigal Son, 1888

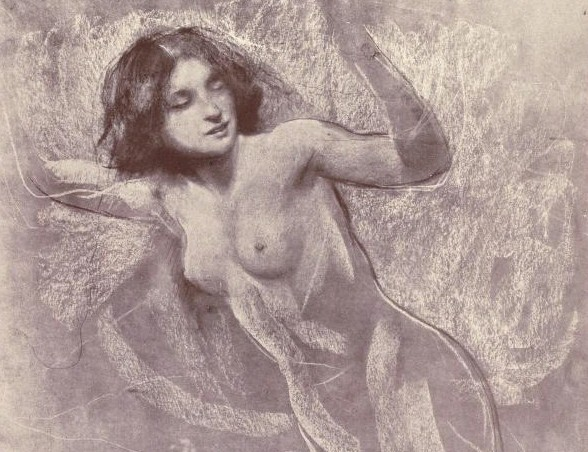
Fata Morgana.

A master of the oil, water-colour and pastel mediums, an accomplished painter and a skilful draughtsman, he ranked also as a sculptor of ability, having worked in nearly every material. He treated the human figure with notable power, but it was by his representations of the larger wild animals, mainly the felidae, that he chiefly established his reputation.

=== Painting ===
His subjects in oil include animals, figures, and landscapes, and are distinguished by massive, simple treatment, and a strongly imaginative element. Noted examples include:

- Ocelot and Fish
- Tigers
- Tigers Drinking
- Ceylon Leopards
- Lions
- Lioness Defending Her Cubs
- Polar Bear Swimming

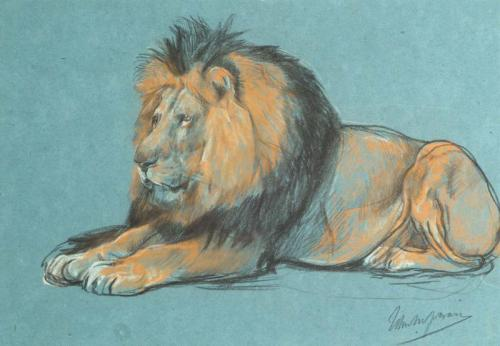
A Black-Maned African Lion - John Macallan Swan in Aberdeen Archives Art Galleries and Museums collection

=== Sculpture ===
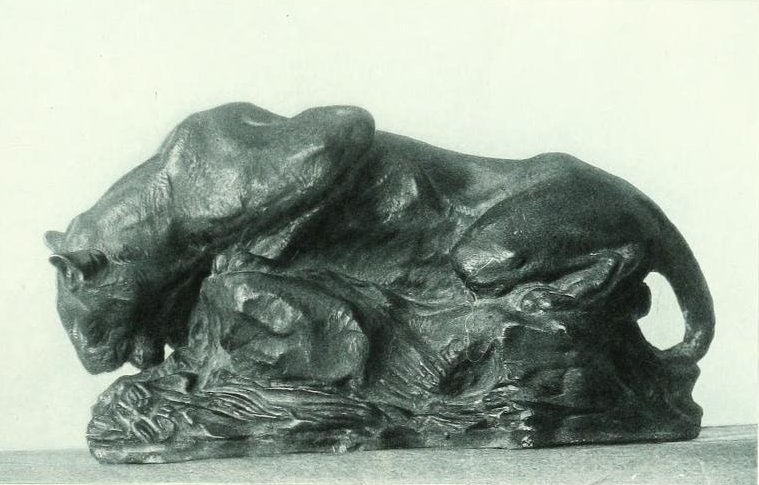
A Lioness drinking, 1894

The modeling in his sculptured works is broad, flexible, and naturalistic. Here he has been compared with Antoine-Louis Barye. Noted examples include:

- The Jaguar
- Puma and Macaw
- Wounded Leopard
- Leopard Running
- The eight bronze lions and bust of Cecil Rhodes at Rhodes Memorial in Cape Town, South Africa
