= Tolka Row =

Irish television drama serial

- Genre: Drama serial
- Created by: Maura Laverty
- Written by: Various
- Country of origin: Ireland
- Original language: English
- No. of series: 5

Production
- Production locations: Studio 1, Television Centre, Donnybrook, Dublin 4
- Camera setup: Multi-camera
- Running time: 25–40 minutes

Original release
- Network: Telefís Éireann
- Release: 3 January 1964 – 31 May 1968

Tolka Row is an Irish television drama serial that aired on Telefís Éireann from 1964 to 1968, set in a fictional housing estate on the northside of Dublin. Based on Maura Laverty's play of the same name, Tolka Row was first broadcast on 3 January 1964 and aired weekly for five series until it ended on 31 May 1968.

As Telefís Éireann's first venture into drama serials, Tolka Row quickly became a staple of the new station's schedule and set the pace for all future home-produced serials. Its popularity also resulted in the station developing a second drama serial, The Riordans, in 1965.

Tolka Row is similar in format to the long-running British serial Coronation Street, from which it borrows its main premise (the everyday life of a number of neighbours). The programme was centred on the Nolans, a typical working-class Dublin family, and their neighbours, the Feeneys. All episodes were filmed in a studio at Telefís Éireann's Television Centre in Donnybrook, Dublin.

== Cast ==
- Jack Nolan – Des Perry
- Rita Nolan – May Oliss
- Seán Nolan – Jim Bartley
- Joan Broderick – Brenda Fricker
- Anastatia Nolan-Doyle – Iris Lawler/Sheila O'Sullivan
- Oliver Feeney – John Molloy
- Assumpta Feeney – Aileen Harte
- Concepta Feeney – Virginia Cole
- Noeleen Feeney – Honor Molloy
- Queenie Butler – May Cluskey
- Mr. Pender – Ritchie Stewart
- Harry Allen – Martin Dempsey
- Andy Kinnear – Gerry Alexander
- Peggy Kinnear – Laurie Morton
- Gabby Doyle – John McDarby
- Paddy Moore – Paddy Long
- Mrs. Moore – Úna McCourt
- Molly Ryan – Patricia Martin
- Jim "Beardie" Toomey – Andrew Irvine

== Production ==
=== Broadcast format ===
During its entire four-year run Tolka Row remained at the centre of Telefís Éireann's prime time schedule. The pilot episode was broadcast at 19:20 on Friday, 3 January 1964. The first two series aired once a week on Fridays at that time. The third series moved to Sunday evenings where it usually aired at 19:45. The last two series returned to Friday evenings with a broadcast time of 20:00. Every episode was pre-recorded in black and white before the broadcast date.

=== Sets ===
For all five series, the complete set of Tolka Row (house interiors and exteriors) was erected inside Studio 1 of Telefís Éireann's Television Centre in Dublin. Sets were constructed and removed on an ad hoc basis. There are a number of reasons for the use of an indoor studio; the main one being that the infancy of production techniques at the time did not allow easy recording and editing of sequences filmed in different locations. In spite of this some scenes were filmed on location in such places as Dublin Airport.

=== Missing episodes ===
Only the final episode, broadcast on 31 May 1968, remains in RTÉ's archives. All other episodes of the series were wiped after broadcast so the videotapes could be reused to make other programmes, and all episodes remain lost.
