= Moila Powell =

British miniaturist and Expressionist artist

- Born: 1895; India
- Died: 1994 (aged 98–99)
- Known for: miniaturist and Expressionist artist

Moila Powell (1895–1994) was a British miniaturist and Expressionist artist.

== Life ==
Moila Powell was born in India in 1895. Her mother was related to the artistic de Angelo family. She married an officer in the Indian Army, Dr William Jackson Powell. The couple lived in India, England, and Dublin, Ireland. Between 1915 and 1939, the couple lived at 10 Cambridge Terrace, Leeson Park, Dublin.

At the beginning of her career, Powell was a miniaturist painting portraits such as of Princess Victoria Melita of Saxe-Coburg and Gotha, Queen Victoria's granddaughter. She met the Irish artist, Norah McGuinness, in Nagpur in 1930. They formed a close artistic friendship. Powell became McGuinness' only pupil, and adopted her Expressionistic style of painting working with mixed media of oil, gouache, wax crayon, pastel and watercolour. Powell travelled extensively, travelling across Europe, Canada and Australia. Returning to Ireland, she frequently visited McGuinness at her studio in Dún Laoghaire.

Her work was exhibited in numerous galleries including, the Paris Salon, the Goupil Gallery, Wertheim Gallery, the Harborough Gallery, Leicestershire and the Duncalfe Galleries, Harrogate. She had at least one daughter, whom Powell visited in the Barossa Valley, Australia. She painted landscapes of the surrounding countryside. Powell painted into her 90s, and died aged 99 in 1994.

The painting by Powell, Norah McGuinness Painting was purchased by the Crawford Art Gallery, Cork in 2021.
