= Oswald Reeves =

British artist (1870–1967)

- Born: Percy Oswald Reeves; 10 August 1870; Birmingham, England
- Died: 12 April 1967 (aged 96); Wicklow, Ireland

Oswald Reeves (10 August 1870 – 12 April 1967) was an English designer, enameller, metalworker, and teacher.

== Life ==
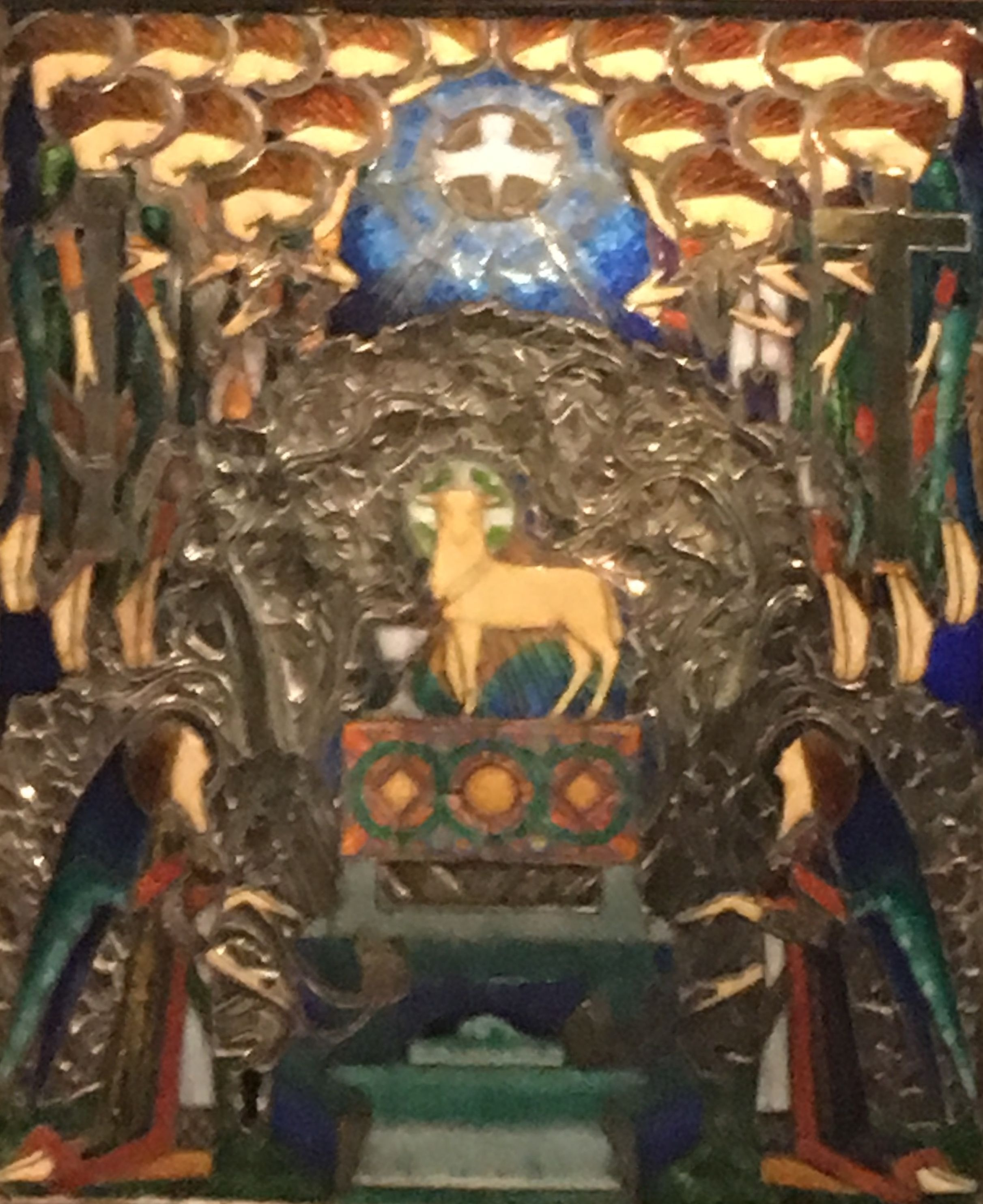
Honan tabernacle (lower) by Reeves

Percy Oswald Reeves was born at 100 Crompton Road, Handsworth (then in Staffordshire, now in Birmingham) on 10 August 1870. His father, John Stanley Reeves, was a schoolteacher. Reeves disliked the name Percy, and was called Peter by his family. He attended night classes in the Birmingham School of Art from age 15, and attained his Art Teacher's Certificate. He later attended the Royal College of Art, South Kensington.

While in London, he joined the studio of Alexander Fisher, and it is believe that he worked with May Morris. Reeves worked as Second Master at the Southport School of Art for 3 years, before being appointed Headmaster of the Camden School of Art, London. Reeves was appointed as "teacher of the Enamelling Class" in October 1903 at the Dublin Metropolitan School of Art. He was re-appointed in 1904, and in 1905 he was also assigned a metalwork class. In April 1919 Reeves took up the position of Second Master. Among his students were Norah McGuinness and Kathleen Fox.

In the 1911 census, he marked his religion as "Follower of the Buddha". In 1913, he married Dora K. Allen (1885-1981), a former pupil and fellow enameller.

Reeves exhibited with Royal Academy, Walker Art Gallery, Arts and Crafts Society, the Royal Hibernian Academy, the Arts and Crafts Society of Ireland, and the Black and White Artists' Society of Ireland. His work was featured at the World's Fair in St. Louis in 1904 and the 1907 Irish International Exhibition in Dublin. He was an active member of the Arts and Crafts Society of Ireland, serving as president from 1955 to 1962. He was a founding member and first master of Guild of Irish Art-Workers. He contributed the tabernacle to the Honan Chapel, Cork. Works from both Reeves and his wife were featured at the Irish art exhibition in Brussels in 1930. He was also commissioned to make various chains of office, badges, and altar candlesticks.

He retired on 31 May 1938, having had an extension past retirement age. Reeves died on 12 April 1967 at his home at Wentworth Place, Wicklow.

== Selected works ==
- The Plunkett Album (1908, destroyed)
- The Response of the Rose (1917)
- Seal of the National Gallery of Ireland (1919)
- War Memorial triptych (1920) All Saints Church, Grangegorman
- Bel-Broid Lingerie shop sign (1921)
- President's Trophy for the Irish Red Cross (1943)
