= Daphne Wright =

Irish artist (born 1963)

- Born: October 1963 (age 62); County Longford, Ireland
- Education: Institute of Technology, Sligo, National College of Art & Design, Newcastle-upon -Tyne Polytechnic
- Awards: Aosdána

Daphne Wright (born 1963) is an Irish visual artist, who makes sculptural installations using a variety of techniques and media to explore how a range of languages and materials can be used to probe unspoken human preoccupations. Recent international exhibition highlights include Hotspot, Galleria Nazionale d’Arte Moderna e Contemporanea, Rome, curated by Gerardo Mosquera; Daphne Wright: Prayer Project, Davis Museum, USA, Portals; the Hellenic Parliament with ΝΕΟΝ, Athens; Infinite Sculpture, Gulbenkian Museum, Lisbon. Wright curated the 2018 exhibition The Ethics of Scrutiny at the Irish Museum of Modern Art as part of the Freud Project. Wright has received the Paul Hamlyn Award, The Henry Moore Foundation Fellowship, and The British School of Rome fellowship. She is a member of Aosdana and is represented by Frith Street Gallery, London.

== Education ==
Wright was born in 1963, in County Longford, Ireland. She studied at the Atlantic Technological University, Sligo, between 1981 and 1985; National College of Art & Design, Dublin, between 1985 and 1987; and between 1989 and 1991 at Newcastle-upon -Tyne Polytechnic.

== Work ==
Wright's work is "concerned with boundaries and the transitory areas of life, exploring the cusp of childhood and adulthood, as well as the spaces and borderlines between life and death." As described by Robert Preece, "Using a wide range of materials and techniques—plaster, tin foil, video, printmaking, found objects, and performance—she creates beautiful and rather eerie worlds that feel like the threshold to somewhere new."

Wright's most recent body of work was shown in A quiet mutiny in Crawford Art Gallery, 2019 and A quiet mutiny – persists, 2020 at Frith Street Gallery London. In this body of work Wright creates worlds that are beautifully eerie: familiar objects from everyday life come under the artist's scrutiny including buggies, houseplants, tall homegrown sunflowers, a fridge and a child's drawing. Expanding on her existing sculptural practice, Wright focuses on the materiality of dry, unfired clay creating a dichotomy of familiarity and fragility. Wright's objects are chosen for their momentary quality, these objects are only fleetingly valued in our daily lives. This work builds on Wrights extensive on-going series of figurative sculpture works, including the pieces Kitchen Table (2014), a Jesmonite cast of the two figures of the artists sons, two chairs and table with oilcloth, hand-painted in watercolour. Other sculpture works such as Stallion (2009) consist of the cast of a dead stallion, positioned by the artist, and rendered in marble dust and resin. Recent video works of note include Is everyone OK? (2019), Song of Songs (2019) and I know what it's like (2012).

== Exhibitions ==
Wright's work is shown in both solo and group exhibitions in Britain and internationally. Recent exhibition highlights include: 2026: Memory and Presence, Gerhard-Marcks-Haus, Bremen; Songs to the Siren, The Model, Sligo (featuring work from the Arts Council of Ireland collection); 2022: Hotspot, Galleria Nazionale d’Arte Moderna e Contemporanea, Rome; No Time to Spare, Tap-gol Museum of Art, Seoul Welfare Center for the Elderly; 2021: Portals, former Public Tobacco Factory – Hellenic Parliament Library and Printing House, a collaboration between the Hellenic Parliament and ΝΕΟΝ, Athens, Greece; 2020: A quiet mutiny – persists, Frith Street Gallery, London (solo); Infinite Sculpture: From the Antique Cast to the 3D Scan, Gulbenkian Museum, Lisbon; 2019: Daphne Wright: a quiet mutiny, Crawford Art Gallery, Cork (solo); Infinite Sculpture: Casts and Copies from the antique to today, Musée des Beaux Arts, Paris; The Size of Thoughts, White Conduit Projects, London; RWA Sculpture Open, Royal West of England Academy, Bristol; Domestic Bliss, Gallery of Modern Art, Glasgow; 2017: Daphne Wright: Prayer Project, Davis Museum at Wellesley College, MA (solo); Emotional Archaeology, Royal Hibernian Academy, Dublin (solo); Kapı Çalana Açılır, Abdülmecid Efendi Köşkü, Üsküdar, Istanbul; 2016: Emotional Archaeology, Arnolfini, Bristol and National Trust, Tyntesfield (solo); 2015: At a time, Limerick City Gallery of Art, Limerick (solo); Qwaypurlake, Hauser & Wirth Somerset, Bruton; Plura (Project Spaces), Irish Museum of Modern Art, Dublin; 2010: Frith Street Gallery, London (solo); 2009: The Prayer Project, The Quad Gallery, Derby, 2006: Sires, Limerick City Gallery of Art, Ireland (solo).

Wright has produced a series of large-scale commissions and her work is housed in many collections internationally; 'Still life' at Hanbury Hall, Worcester, 'Plura', South Tipperary County Council and IMMA Irish Museum of Modern Art, 'Stallion', VISUAL Carlow, Ireland, 'Home Ornaments', Gorbals, Glasgow, in association with CWZG Architects and The Artworks Programme and GOMA, Glasgow, 'Theses Talking Walls ' New Art Centre, Salisbury, 'Prayer Project' Derby with Picture This Bristol, and 'Garden of Reason', Ham House and Garden, Richmond. Her work is housed in the collections of Arts Council of Ireland; Irish Museum of Modern Art, Dublin; Crawford Art Gallery, Cork; Gallery of Modern Art, Glasgow; Hamburger Kunsthalle, Hamburg, Germany; National Gallery of Ireland, Dublin; Towner Art Gallery, Sussex (purchased through Contemporary Art Society and Arts Council of England) and Vehbi Koç Collection, Istanbul, Turkey, amongst many others.

== Recognition ==
Wright has received the following awards and fellowships; Henry Moore Foundation Fellowship, Manchester Metropolitan University, Cheltenham Fellowship, British School at Rome Award in Sculpture and the 1996 Paul Hamlyn Award.
