= Oliver Sheppard =

Irish sculptor

Oliver Sheppard RHA (10 April 1865 – 14 September 1941) was an Irish sculptor, most famous for his 1911 bronze statue of the mythical Cuchullain dying in battle. His work was also part of the art competitions at the 1924 Summer Olympics and the 1928 Summer Olympics.

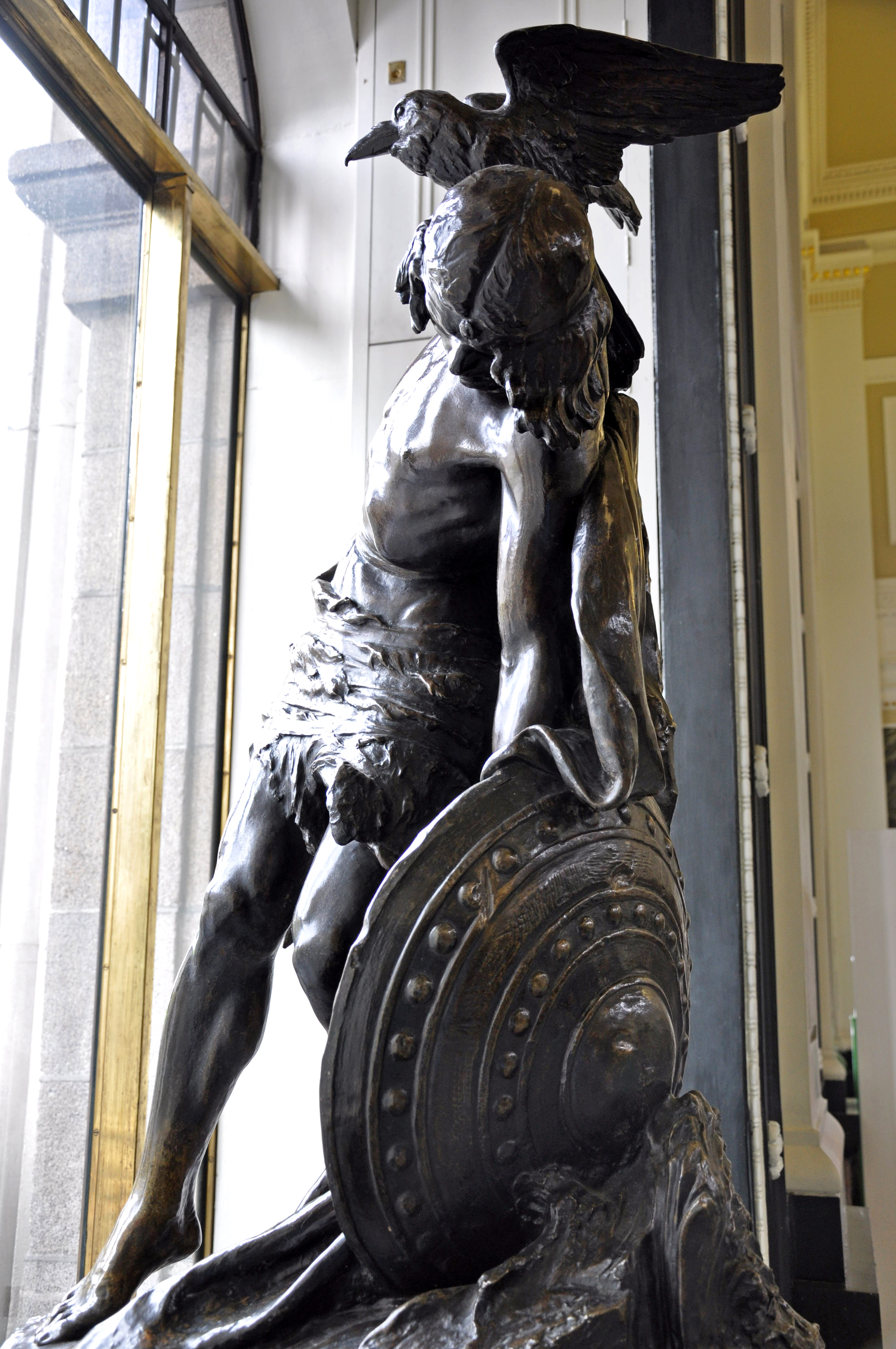
The Dying Cuchulain (1911), now at the GPO, Dublin

== Family ==
Sheppard was born at Old Town, Cookstown, County Tyrone, to Simpson Sheppard, a sculptor, and Ellen White, of Ormond Quay, Dublin.

Sheppard was based in Dublin for almost all of his life, having travelled widely across Europe. He lived with his wife Rosie and their children in Howth and later at 30 Pembroke Road in central Dublin. Rosie died in 1931.

== Education ==
His main influence was the Frenchman Édouard Lantéri who taught him at the Royal College of Art in London, and then at the Dublin Metropolitan School of Art (DMSA) in Dublin (now the NCAD), where he later became a lecturer.

== Teaching ==
From 1902 to 1937 Sheppard taught sculpture at the DMSA, that was renamed the National College of Art in 1936 (today the NCAD). His annual stipend was £250 but for this he only had to lecture on three mornings a week, allowing him plenty of time for work on commissioned projects. Among his students were sculptors James Power and Kathleen Cox.

As a prominent sculptor Sheppard was a member of the Royal Hibernian Academy, the Royal Dublin Society, and was made a governor of the National Gallery of Ireland from 1925–41.

He was generally critical of the low standards of sculpture in Ireland: "For the last sixty years or so thousands of figures and groups have been executed in Dublin for ecclesiastical purposes, and, with one or two exceptions ... was not up to a reasonable standard. The making of a work of art hardly entered into it at all. The sculptor, well trained and properly encouraged, should collaborate with the architect."

Sheppard also exhibited works at European exhibitions in his lifetime, occasionally winning prizes.

== Prominent works ==
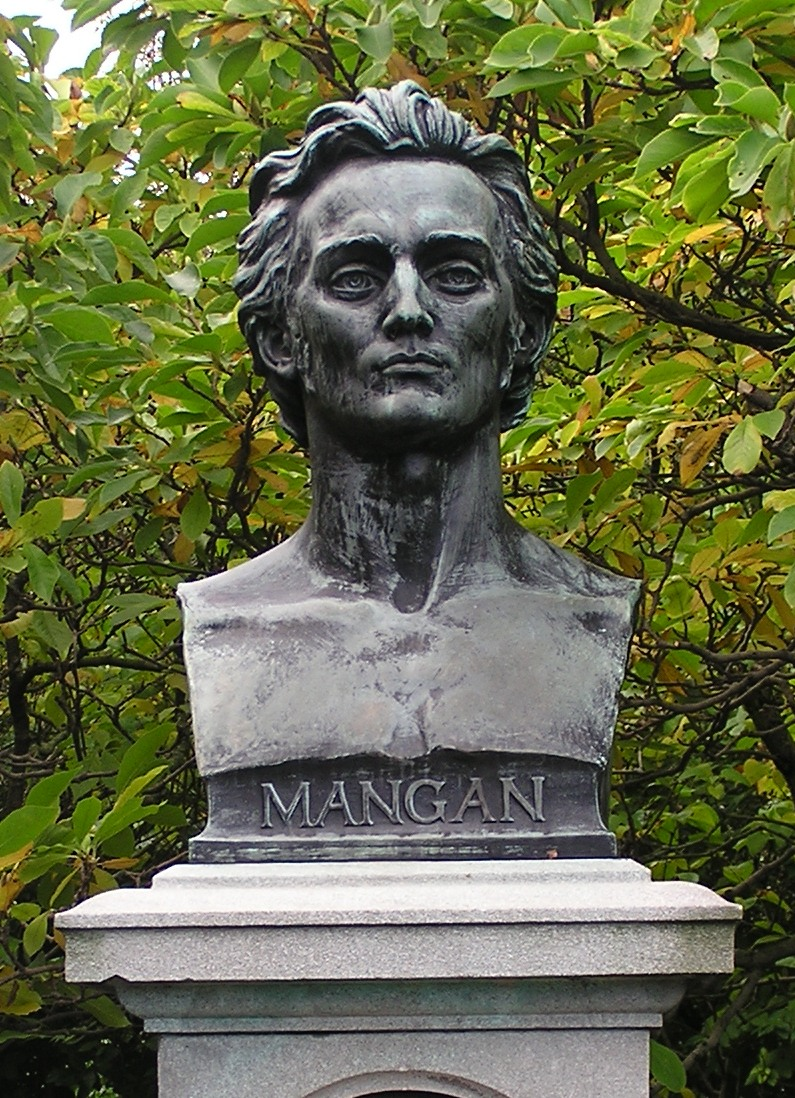
Memorial bust of Mangan.

- 1901; imaginary statue of "Inis Fáil", seeing Ireland as an "island of destiny".
- 1905; statue of a pikeman at Wexford, recalling the rebels in the 1798 rebellion.
- 1908; Another pikeman statue at nearby Enniscorthy.
- 1909; bust of the poet James Clarence Mangan in St Stephen's Green, Dublin.
- 1911; The "Dying Cuchulain" is Sheppard's most iconic piece, inspired in part by the success of "Cuchulain of Muirthemne", the translation by Lady Gregory of most of the Tain saga that was published in 1902.
- 1920; war memorials for the Irish solicitors and barristers who had died in the First World War (1914–18), which includes a bust of Major Willie Redmond.
- 1922, bronze plaque in memory of Dr. James Little at the Royal College of Physicians of Ireland.
- 1926; bust of his lifelong friend George Russell, best known as "Æ".
- 1930; busts of John Joly at Trinity College Dublin and the Royal Dublin Society.
- 1935; Aida, a bust now at the Crawford Gallery in Cork.
- 1935; Installation of The "Dying Cuchulain" at the GPO, Dublin, that had been the rebels' headquarters in 1916, at the request of Éamon de Valera, President of the Executive Council (prime minister) at that time. The statue has had a continuing impact, and in 1966 a 50th anniversary commemoration special coin was struck with an image of it.

== Political influence and opinion ==
Sheppard was in the minority of Irish Protestants who supported independence, starting with support for the Irish Parliamentary Party in the 1880s, when he was an art student.

In 1890–1910 he was a part of the Celtic Revival movement, and, from his works such as Inis Fáil, was admired by his student William Pearse. Through him he met his brother Patrick Pearse who later helped launch the Easter Rising in 1916. While most of the Revival's artists were writers, playwrights and poets, Sheppard could claim to be the main sculptor working on themes similar to theirs.

After the Anglo-Irish war (1919–21) he said: "They thought me too old to fight but I have tried to help in other ways. My politics are simple. I have always thought that this country should be a free country."

Sheppard's opinions were not overly dogmatic, considering his work on the war memorials in 1920.

== Coin designs ==
In the mid-1920s the first series of Irish Free State coinage was planned, and was finally launched in 1928. Sheppard was one of the designers short-listed but his designs were not accepted.

== See also ==
- Protestant Nationalist

== References and sources ==
Notes

Sources

- History Ireland article on his main memorial statue in Wexford of the 1798 rebellion (1998)
- Professor John Turpin biography
- Online biography
- John Turpin; 2-part article on Sheppard in the Dublin Historical Record (1995) vol.18, parts 1 & 2. ISSN 0012-6861.
