= Kathleen Cox =

Irish artist

- Born: Christina Mary Kathleen Cox; 2 July 1904; Wo Sung, China
- Died: September 1972 (aged 68); London, United Kingdom
- Education: Dublin Metropolitan School of Art
- Notable work: sculpture
- Spouse: Alan Palmer
- Awards: Royal Dublin Society Taylor prize (1925, 1926, 1927)

Kathleen Cox (2 July 1904 – September 1972) was an Irish artist, sculptor, and mystic. Cox is considered a pioneer of contemporary Irish pottery.

== Early life and education ==
Christina Mary Kathleen Cox was born in Wo-Sung, China, on 2, July 1904. She was the eldest daughter of Dr R. H. Cox, who was from Dundalk. Dr Cox was the port health officer in Shanghai, who was also an amateur geologist and modelled in clay. In his retirement, he invented a periscope later used during World War I by the Royal Navy. Those years living in China left an impression on the young Cox, visually and culturally. The family returned to Ireland in 1911, first moving to Listowel, County Kerry, and later to Howth, County Dublin. Cox attended Alexandra College, and later the Dublin Metropolitan School of Art in 1921. Whilst there she studied sculpture under Oliver Sheppard and was considered one of his most talented students, winning the Royal Dublin Society Taylor prize for modelling in 1925, 1926, and 1927. The money from these prizes allowed Cox to travel to Paris in 1929.

== Artistic career and later life ==
Cox exhibited in 1924 at the Tailteann exhibitions, and in 1925 submitted textile designs to the Arts and Crafts Society. She established a pottery studio at 7 Schoolhouse Lane, Dublin, with college friend Stella Rayner in 1929. The studio had the first electric kiln in Ireland. The first exhibited piece by Cox shown by the Royal Hibernian Academy (RHA) was in 1930, with a pair of Madonna bookends, and portrait masks of the daughter of Dermod O'Brien, Brigid O'Brien, and writer Norris Davidson. Davidson was a friend and neighbour, who commissioned Cox to design the poster for his 1929 film, Suicide. Cox exhibited with the RHA from 1931 to 1933, and the Tailteann 1932, whilst also holding exhibitions in her studio. During this period Hilda Roberts painted her portrait, Strange Spirit. Kathleen Cox in her studio. The theme of womanhood was prominent in her work, including in the sign of her studio.

In 1932, Cox began producing a line of more commercial figurines, drawing influence from the Royal Doulton Burslem factory, where she worked for a time. One such figurine was The lavender man, modelled on Michael Clifford, a Dublin street trader. In the mid 1930s, Cox developed a frustration with her work and with her lack of impact on the wider world. In attending the Chinese exhibition in London in 1935, it was confirmed to her that pottery should be practical rather than ornamental. It spurred her to destroy all her moulds and sell her kiln upon her return to Dublin. She married Alan Palmer in 1937, the couple had two daughters and relocated to England. Palmer was a conscientious objector during World War II, with the couple running a farm at Meopham, Kent, returning to London after the war. Cox died in early September 1972 in London. Some of her work is held in the collections of the National Museum of Ireland and with four works featured in the exhibition Not Just Pots: Contemporary Irish Ceramics of the 21st Century.

== Mysticism ==
It was during the 1920s that Cox began to question mainstream religion, and became a vegetarian. Finding that her personal philosophy was similar to that of theosophy, she joined the movement and spoke at meetings. She was heavily influenced by the founder of the Order of the Great Companions, the Rev. William Hayes, who was living in Dublin in the 1930s. Cox wrote and illustrated a children's book on world religions, A story of stories, which she published under the pseudonym C.M. Kay in 1970.
