= Sine MacKinnon =

Irish painter

- Born: 11 February 1901; Newcastle, County Down, Ireland
- Died: 1996 (aged 94–95); Paris, France
- Education: Slade School of Fine Art
- Known for: Landscapes

Sine MacKinnon (11 February 1901 – 1996) was an Irish landscape artist.

== Early life ==
Selina Mairi Sine MacKinnon was born in Newcastle, County Down to Ranuld Edmund Eliot MacKinnon of Binfield, Surrey and Clementina Alicia née D'Arcy. Her father was a clerk in the law courts in London.

She was educated in the Slade School of Fine Art in London between 1918 and 1924. Her mentor was Henry Tonks. Her portrait was painted by a fellow student Allan Gwynne-Jones in 1922.

== Work ==
MacKinnon exhibited twice in Paris in the 1920s and then in the Goupil Gallery in London in 1928. It was about this time she met her future husband Rupert Granville Fordham. She exhibited 29 paintings at the Fine Art Society in London in 1929. Mackinnon had a daughter, Jan Fordham, born in August 1935. The Tate Gallery purchased her painting, Farm Buildings in Provence (1934) in 1940.

By 1949 she had works in the Leicester Galleries, two works in the Tate Gallery and paintings in the Galerie nationale du Jeu de Paume, Paris, Gallery Oldham, Brighton and Manchester City Galleries. She had exhibited in the New English Art Club, the London Group, the Royal Academy, the Salon d'Automne, the Lefevre Gallery, the Redfern Gallery and Arthur Tooth & Sons Gallery.

Her work was critiqued by Thomas MacGreevy.

When her husband was ill, MacKinnon reduced her painting. He died in 1974. After that she began to show in exhibitions again. She was a member of the French women artists group « Art et Regard des Femmes ». Mackinnon died in Paris in 1996.
