= Eileen Coghlan =

Irish illustrator

- Born: 18 May 1909; Kilbeggan, County Westmeath, Ireland
- Died: 13 April 1990 (aged 80); Midland General Hospital, Tullamore, County Offaly
- Known for: illustrations and painting

Eileen Coghlan (18 May 1909-13 April 1990) was an Irish illustrator and painter.

== Life ==
Eileen Coghlan was born on 18 May 1909 in Kilbeggan, County Westmeath. Her parents were William, a merchant tailor, and Mary Coghlan (neé McClelland). She had three sisters, Mary, Una, and Josephine, and five brothers Michael, Des, Gerald, John, Fergus and Dermot. Coghlan attended the Dublin Metropolitan School of Art for a short time.

In her early career she worked in commercial art, before moving almost exclusively to book illustration, particularly for children's books and schoolbooks. She worked for Browne and Nolan Ltd, The Educational Company of Ireland, and Folens Publishers. She illustrated the Fact and Fancy readers, Mary Flynn's Cornelius Rabbit of Tang (1944), John D. Sheridan's Paradise Alley, Maura Laverty's The Cottage in the Bog, Francis McManus' Statue for a Square, Eileen O'Faolain's Miss Pennyfeather and the Pooka, and Patricia Lynch's Strangers at the Fair. Lynch's book was also published as a Puffin Story Book. Coghlan also illustrated three books by Sinéad de Valera.

Coghlan lived in Dublin, which resulted in her also contributing the occasional cartoon to the Dublin Opinion. For a time in the 1960s, she wrote and illustrated for a weekly humorous topical column in The Irish Press. Her illustrations also appeared in the Irish Digest. She occasionally exhibited with the Water Colour Society of Ireland, painting portraits, landscapes, as well as town and cityscapes. She continued to work and paint up to the 1980s.

She died on 13 April 1990 in Midland General Hospital, Tullamore, County Offaly. She is buried in Kilbeggan Cemetery. Longford-Westmeath County Library hold three watercolours by Coghlan.
