= Maude Mary Ball =

Irish painter and sculptor

- Born: 5 April 1883; Dublin
- Died: 7 April 1969 (aged 86); Dublin

Maude Mary Ball (5 April 1883 – 7 April 1969), was an Irish artist working in both paintings and sculpture.

== Life ==
Maude Mary Ball was born on 5 April 1883 to Valentine Ball and his wife Mary Stewart-Moore in Dublin. Her father was a geologist and Director at Science and Art Museum in Dublin. Her younger sister Ethel Gresley Ball was also an artist. She was educated privately, and went to study at the Royal Hibernian Academy Schools and at the Dublin Metropolitan School of Art, winning prizes at both institutions.

She was an artist who was a member of the Royal Dublin Society and the Royal Zoological Society of Ireland. She exhibited at RHA Annual Exhibition from 1910 until 1935, showing 50 pieces in that time. She took sketching trips to France with fellow artist, Dorothy FitzGerald. In 1922, she exhibited with FitzGerald and her sister Ethel, at Mills' Hall, Merrion Row, Dublin, and again with her sister in 1930. Ball was a friend of the Belgian painter, Marie Howet, having met her on Achill Island in 1929. Ball exhibited with the Salon des Artistes Francais in 1938 and 1939. She was also a close friend of Mainie Jellett, and was a supporter of her when her abstract painting drew criticism and helped her in hanging some of her exhibitions.

Ball died in a nursing home on 7 April 1969.

== Sources ==
- "Person Page". The Peerage. 22 September 2004.
- "Miss Maude Mary Ball". Mapping the Practice and Profession of Sculpture in Britain and Ireland 1851-1951. Archived from the original on 16 November 2018.
- "BALL Maude Mary 1883-1969". Artist Biographies.
