= Frances Beckett =

Frances "Cissie" Beckett (1880–1951) was an Irish artist. She was a contemporary of Estella Solomons and Beatrice Elvery, with whom she studied at Académie Colarossi. She was part of the Young Irish Artists exhibition and exhibited at the Royal Hibernian Academy. She was also the paternal aunt of Nobel laureate Samuel Beckett.

== Artistic life ==
Beckett studied art at the Dublin Metropolitan School of Art and in Paris at Colarossi's studio, where she went with Estella Solomons and Dorothy and Beatrice Elvery. In 1903 she exhibited with the Young Irish Artists group with the same group of friends. She exhibited at the Royal Hibernian Academy between 1897 and 1908.

A portrait by her of Solomons, which had once belonged to Kathleen Goodfellow, is in the Model Niland collection in Sligo. Another work, a portrait of Israel Leventon, is at the Irish Jewish Museum. Some of her work is also in the Solomons archive held by the library of Trinity College Dublin.

== Personal life ==
Beckett's father was William Beckett and she has four brothers. Her brother William, was Samuel Beckett's father. Beckett was known as 'Cissie'.

She married an antique dealer called William 'the Boss' Sinclair. They lived in Howth and had several children one of whom, Ruth Margaret (1911–33), known as Peggy, was one of two women who are both identified as having been Samuel Beckett's 'first love', the other being poet and medical doctor Ethna McCarthy. In the early 1920s the Sinclairs went to live in Germany, where they were often visited by Samuel Beckett. Cissie is said to have fostered his artistic sensibilities. The Sinclairs' business interests suffered under the Nazi persecution of the Jews in Germany and they returned to Ireland.

Cissie Beckett found family life encroached on her artistic activities. She was further restricted in her work by arthritis towards the end of her life.
