= Mary Rankin Swan =

Irish painter

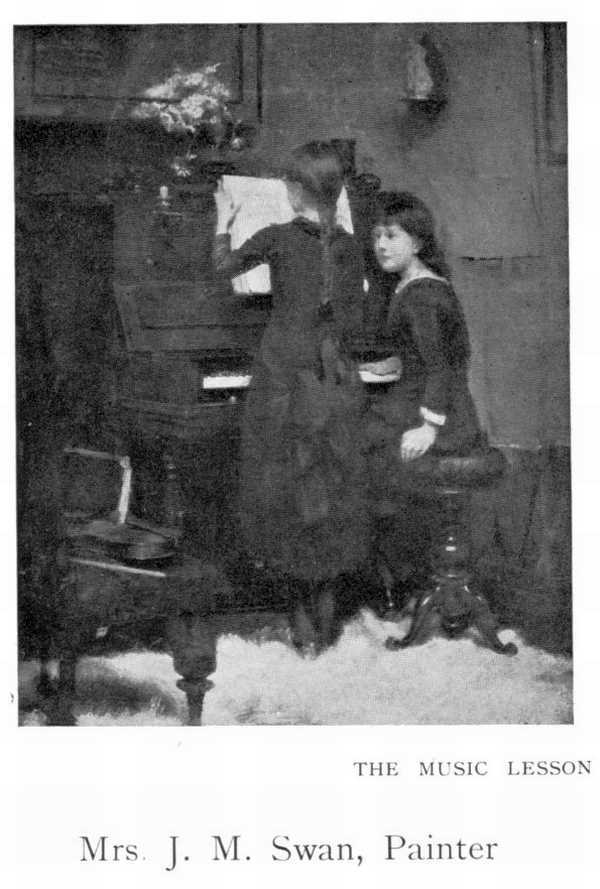
- Born: Mary Ann Rankin; 1865; Ireland
- Died: 1944 (aged 78–79)
- Known for: Portraits of Children
- Notable work: Sunbeams, The music Lesson

Mary Rankin Swan (1865–1944), also Mrs John Macallan Swan, was an Irish portrait artist.

== Life ==
Born Mary Anne Rankin in Coleraine, Ireland, in 1865. Her father was Hamilton Rankin of Camdonagh, County Donegal, he was an inspector of waterworks. She married the artist John Macallan Swan in Cork in 1884. She was an artist who specialised in depictions of children and occasionally sculptures.

Together, they had two children, John Barye Rankin, an engineer who served as a Naval Volunteer Reserve in the First World War, and Mary Alice, who went on to become a sculptor and medalist.

The family lived in London. She died in 1944.
