= Janie Beamish =

Irish landscape painter

- Born: Jane Eliza Beamish; 26 July 1856; Bandon, County Cork, Ireland
- Died: 26 November 1930 (aged 74); Bangor, County Down

Janie Beamish (26 July 1856–26 November 1930) was an Irish landscape painter and etcher.

== Life ==
Across the bay at Timoleague (1913)

Janie Beamish was born Jane Eliza Beamish on 26 July 1856, in Bandon, County Cork. Her father was Henry Beamish. She lived in Ballymodan House, from where she taught music and painting. She was also the organist for the local Bandon Methodist Church.

Beamish is known for her landscapes, particularly around Bandon, the Cork coast, Ennis and along the River Boyne. She also painted in Ulster, including landscapes in County Down. She exhibited with the Royal Hibernian Academy (RHA) from 1905 and the Royal Society of Painter-Printmakers. She exhibited over 50 works with the RHA over the course of 20 years. Between 1908 and 1930, she exhibited 90 works with the Water Colour Society of Ireland. Her paintings were among those loaned to the Belfast Museum and Art Gallery in 1913 for an exhibition of "modern paintings". She also exhibited with the Munster Fine Art Club, alongside artists such as Hugh Charde, Michael Holland, Nellie Welply, Samuel Williams and Kathleen Murphy O'Connor.

Beamish moved from Cork to 21 Waverly Drive, Bangor, County Down. She died there on 26 November 1930. The Crawford Art Gallery hold some of her works.
