= Ruth Brandt =

Irish artist

- Born: 22 June 1936; Dublin, Ireland
- Died: 13 August 1989 (aged 53); Dublin, Ireland
- Education: Dublin Metropolitan School of Art
- Known for: illustration
- Spouse: Michael Kane
- Awards: Royal Dublin Society Taylor Prize (1957)

Ruth Brandt (22 June 1936 – 13 August 1989) was an Irish artist and teacher, who was known for drawing inspiration from nature for her work.

== Early life and education ==
Ruth Brandt was born in Dublin on 22 June 1936. She was the eldest child of graphic designer of Frank Brandt and artist Muriel Brandt (née McKinley). Brandt attended the Dominican convent, Santa Sabina, Sutton, Dublin. She spent time in Paris, around 1953, teaching English in a convent on Rue de la Santé, Paris, after which she enrolled in the National College of Art and Design (NCAD) with a three-year scholarship. Brandt spent a year in Florence, funded through an Italian government grant, and whilst there met fellow Irish artist Michael Kane. Brandt married Kane in 1961, and had a son and a daughter.

== Artistic career ==
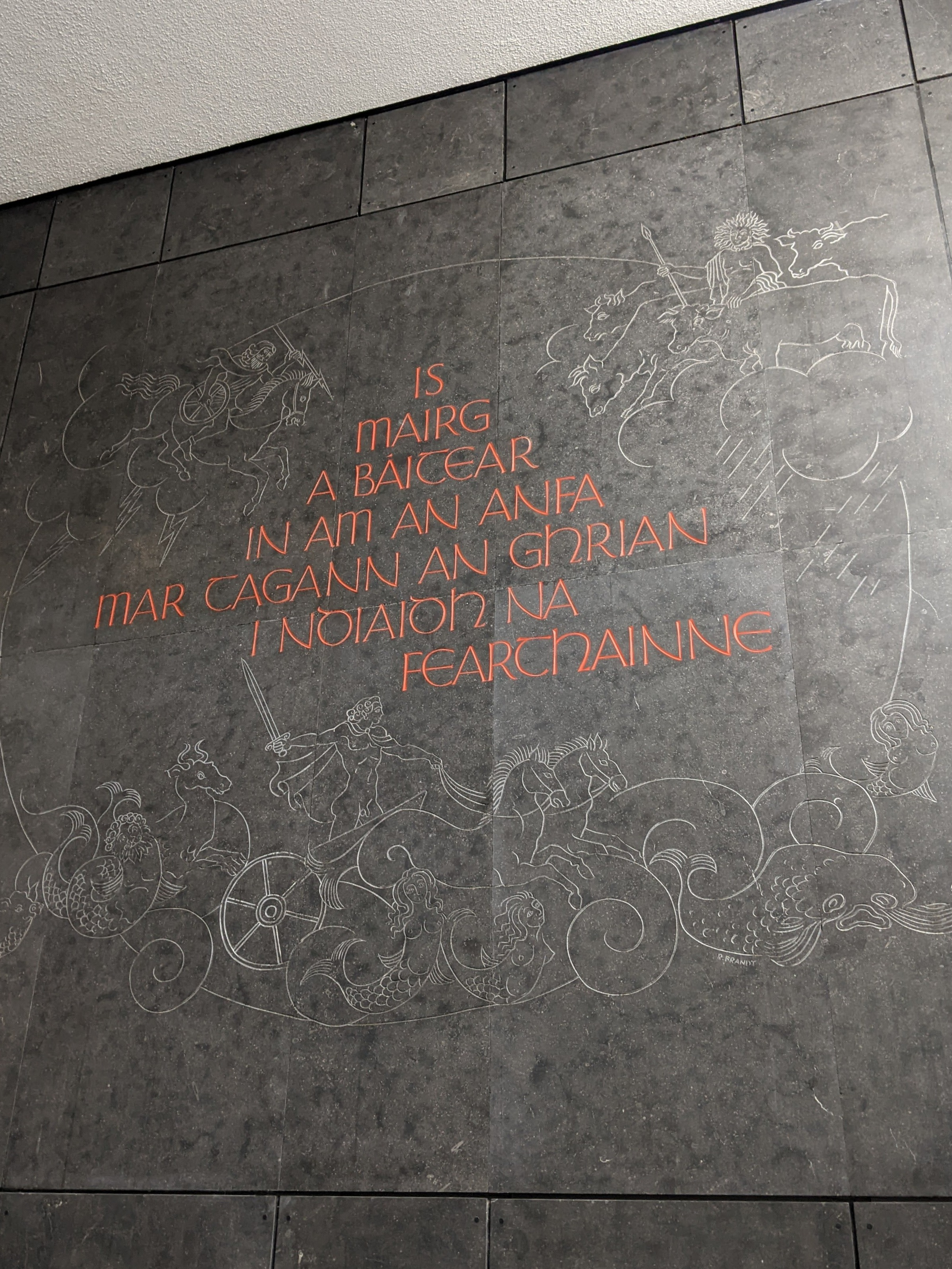
Mural by Brandt in the lobby of the Met Éireann headquarters, Glasnevin.

Brandt first exhibited with the Royal Hibernian Academy in 1958, with the painting At the jazz band ball. She was also featured in the Irish Exhibition of Living Art in 1961, with three works. After this point, Brandt divided her time between teaching at NCAD and summer classes for children with her husband, and freelance lettering and illustration. Such illustration is her work in Sheelah Kirby's 1962 The Yeats country and John Irvine's 1964 A treasury of Irish saints. Brandt designed the devices for the Dolmen Press and Poetry Ireland in the 1960s. The 1965 National Gallery of Ireland centenary exhibition about W. B. Yeats, ten black-ink drawings of Yeats' London homes by Brandt were displayed.

Brandt began to collaborate with the architect Liam McCormick from the early 1970s, with her contributing to work to his County Donegal churches, St Michael's, Creeslough and St Conal's, Glenties. Other McCormick buildings that Brandt worked on include the stained-glass window design for the Oratory of the Resurrection of Our Lord, Artane, Dublin, and a mural for the atrium of the Met Éireann head quarters, Glasnevin. The inscription of the Met Éireann mural, inscribed into black granite, reads in Irish: "Is mairg a báitear in am anfa mar tagann an ghrian i ndiadh na fearthainne" (Pity the person who drowns in storm, for the sun always follows the rain).

The parish of St Brigid's, Blanchardstown, commissioned Brandt to design a plaque in commemoration of the parish priests. She was amongst the initial contributors to the magazine Structure, which was founded by Kane in 1972. From 1973, Brandt worked at the Graphic Studio Dublin returning to etching. She was involved in the running of the associated Gallery until her death. Brandt was exhibited extensively from the mid-1970s, at shows such as United Arts Club, Dublin in 1975, Kenny Gallery, Galway in 1975, the Emmet Gallery in 1976, and the Setanta Gallery, Dublin in 1978. She was featured in a group exhibitions in Nottingham, and the 1976 Belfast Creative women exhibition. From 1976, Brandt became a full-time lecture at NCAD. Her work was exhibited at the Five contemporary artists at Tara Galerie, Zürich in 1981. Brandt held solo exhibitions at the Lincoln Gallery, Dublin in 1982, and at the James Gallery, Dalkey in 1985. She was awarded prizes by the Royal Hibernian Academy, for her graphics in 1986, and watercolours in 1989.

== Later life ==
Brandt was a convert to Buddhism, attending Kagyu Samye Ling Monastery and Tibetan Centre retreat in 1979. Much like her mother, Brandt was a keen gardener, and used nature as an inspiration for her work. Brandt moved to Sherrard Avenue in Dublin after separating from Kane, and she also owned a cottage in County Wicklow. Declining health led to Brandt's retirement in 1988. She died at her home on 13 August 1989. Her work was part of the collection of Charles Haughey, sold in 2009.
