= Everina Sinclair =

Irish woodworker and teacher

- Born: Everina Mary Caroline Sinclair; 21 May 1870; Dublin, Ireland
- Died: 1966 (aged 95–96); Ireland
- Occupations: Teacher, artist

Everina Sinclair (21 May 1870 – 1966), was an Irish woodworker and teacher.

== Early life and career ==
Everina Mary Caroline Sinclair was born into a landowning family, of Bonnyglen, Inver, County Donegal. The Sinclair family had been based in Holyhill, Strabane, County Tyrone from the mid seventeenth century but had bought Bonnyglen in 1848. Her father was James Montgomery Sinclair who became a Justice of the Peace and high sheriff of County Donegal in 1899. Her mother was Mary Everina Barton, youngest daughter of Lieutenant Colonel Hugh Barton of the 2nd Life Guards. She had a brother, William Hugh Montgomery Sinclair (1868–1930) who was a barrister from 1897 before joining the consular service in 1900. She also had a sister Rosabelle.

Little is known about her life but she began to receive notice for her woodwork especially when she won a prize for a folding chair at the 1890 show of the Royal Dublin Society. She taught woodwork in Bonnyglen, Dunkineely, and Donegal town. Her students were regular exhibitors at the RDS shows. several Lancaster arts and crafts. Lady Bective began a series of shows and exhibitions in Lancaster in 1897. Sinclair's Donegal students' work was selected in a number of different media to represent Irish work at the shows.

Sinclair was one of Ireland adherents of the Arts and Crafts movement, bringing it to Ireland, and developing a native, Celtic style.

== Personal life ==
Sinclair got married on 18 April 1900 to Charles Leonard Dobbin Maxwell in South Africa. They had one daughter Edith Heather who was born in New Zealand. By 1911 home was Inishcoo Island in Donegal. She seems to have stopped teaching after her marriage. Sinclair died in 1966.
