= Seán Ó Faoláin =

Irish writer

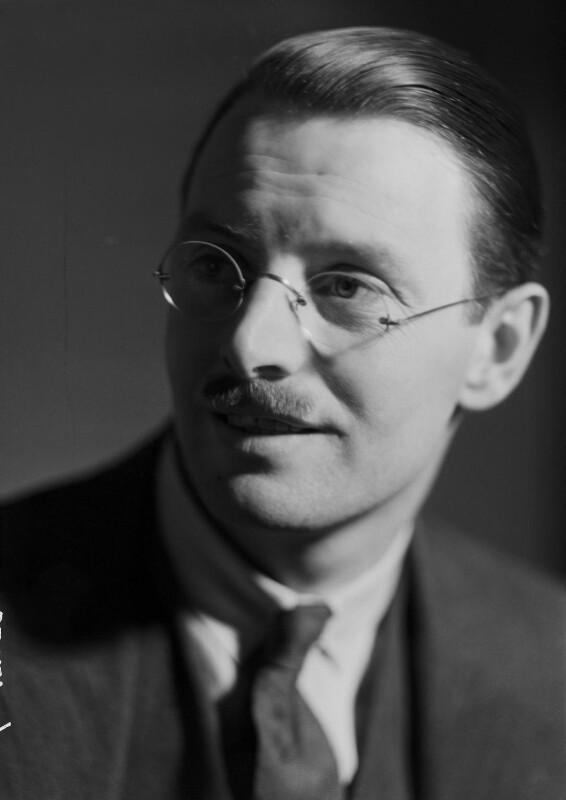
- Portrait of Seán Ó Faoláin by Howard Coster, 1930's
- Born: John Francis Whelan; February 27, 1900; Cork, Ireland
- Died: April 20, 1991 (aged 91); Dublin, Ireland
- Occupation: Writer

Seán Proinsias Ó Faoláin (27 February 1900 – 20 April 1991) was one of the most influential figures in 20th-century Irish culture. A short-story writer of international repute, he was also a leading commentator and critic.

== Biography ==
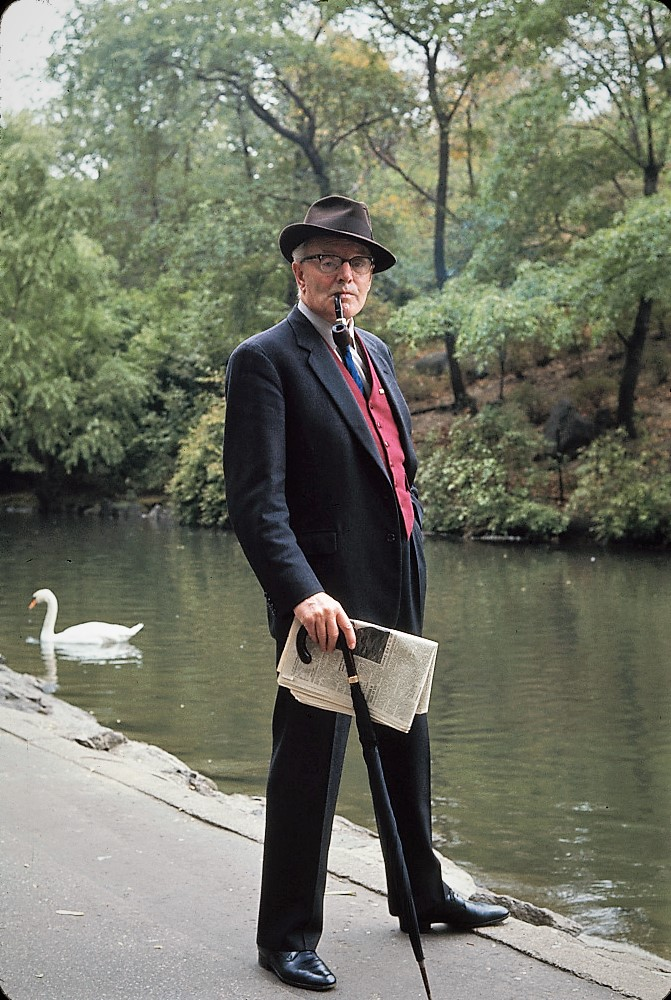
Ó Faoláin in 1964

Ó Faoláin was born as John Francis Whelan in Cork City, County Cork, Ireland. He was educated at the Presentation Brothers Secondary School in Cork. He came under the influence of Daniel Corkery, joining the Cork Dramatic Society, and increasing his knowledge of the Irish language, which he had begun in school. Shortly after entering University College, Cork, he joined the Irish Volunteers. He fought in the Irish War of Independence. He supported the anti-treaty forces during the Irish Civil War, serving as Censor for the Cork Examiner and on publicity issues for the IRA. After the Republican loss, he received M.A. degrees from the National University of Ireland and from Harvard University where he studied for three years. He was a Commonwealth Fellow from 1926 to 1928; and was a Harvard Fellow from 1928 to 1929.

He wrote his first stories in the 1920s, eventually completing 90 stories over a period of 60 years. From 1929 to 1933 he lectured at the Catholic college, St Mary's College, at Strawberry Hill in Middlesex, England, during which period he wrote his first two books. His first book, Midsummer Night Madness, was published in 1932: it was a collection of stories partly based on his Civil War experiences. He afterwards returned to Ireland. He published novels; short stories; biographies; travel books; translations; literary criticism—including one of the rare full-length studies of the short story: The Short Story (1948). He also wrote a cultural history, The Irish, in 1947.

He served as director of the Arts Council of Ireland from 1956 to 1959, and from 1940 to 1946 was a founder member and editor of the Irish literary periodical The Bell. The list of contributors to The Bell included many of Ireland's foremost writers, among them Patrick Kavanagh, Patrick Swift, Flann O'Brien, Frank O'Connor and Brendan Behan.

His Collected Stories were published in 1983. He died on 20 April 1991 in Dublin.

== Publishing ==
Over the course of a long publishing career, Ó Faoláin wrote eight volumes of short stories, the first of which, Midsummer Night Madness, appeared in 1932; his last volume, Foreign Affairs, was published over forty years later, in 1976. Ó Faoláin also wrote four novels, three travel books, six biographies to include Constance Markievicz, Cardinal Newman, Daniel O'Connell, and Wolfe Tone, a play, a memoir, a history book, and a so-called "character study." He produced critical studies of the novel and the short-story form, introduced texts of historical and literary merit, and contributed scores of articles, reviews, and uncollected stories to periodicals in Ireland, Britain, and America.

Most famously, he co-founded and edited the influential journal The Bell from 1940 to 1946. Under Ó Faoláin's editorship, The Bell participated in many key debates of the day; it also provided a crucial outlet for established and emerging writers during the lean war years. A recurring thread in Ó Faoláin's work is the idea that national identities are historically produced and culturally hybrid; an additional thesis is that Irish history should be conceived in international terms, and that it should be read, in particular, in the context of social and intellectual developments across Europe.

Ó Faoláin was a controversial figure in his lifetime and two of his books were banned for "indecency" in Ireland—his debut collection of short stories and his second novel, Bird Alone (1936). His legacy has proved divisive. If some consider him a social liberal cosmopolitan who challenged "proscriptive" definitions of Irish culture, others see him as a chauvinistic snob who paradoxically restricted the development of Irish writing. Proto-revisionist or nascent postcolonial, Ó Faoláin has been considered both, sometimes within the same critical survey. Either way, his work was central to the evolution of a post–Literary Revival aesthetic, and his voice was one of the most prominent, and eloquent, in the fight against censorship in Ireland.

== Personal life ==
Ó Faoláin married Eileen Gould, a children's book writer who published several books of Irish folk tales, in 1929. They had two children: Julia (1932–2020), who became a Booker-nominated novelist and short story writer, and Stephen (born 1938).

== Books ==
=== Novels ===
- A Nest of Simple Folk (Jonathan Cape/Viking, 1933)
- Bird Alone (Jonathan Cape/Viking, 1936)
- Come Back to Erin (Jonathan Cape/Viking, 1940)
- And Again? (Constable, 1979)

=== Short fiction ===
- Midsummer Night Madness and Other Stories (Jonathan Cape/Viking, 1932)
- A Purse of Coppers (Jonathan Cape/Viking, 1937)
- Teresa and Other Stories (Jonathan Cape, 1947)
- The Man Who Invented Sin and Other Stories (Devin-Adair, 1948)
- The Finest Stories of Sean O’Faolain (Little, Brown, 1957)
- I Remember! I Remember! (Little, Brown, 1961)
- The Heat of the Sun and Other Stories (Little, Brown, 1966)
- The Talking Trees and Other Stories (Little, Brown, 1971)
- Foreign Affairs and Other Stories (Little, Brown, 1976)
- Selected Stories of Sean O’Faolain (Little, Brown, 1978)
- The Collected Stories of Sean O'Faolain, Volume 1 (Constable, 1980)
- The Collected Stories of Sean O’Faolain, Volume 2 (Constable, 1981)
- The Collected Stories of Sean O’Faolain, Volume 3 (Constable, 1982)
- The Collected Stories of Sean O’Faolain (Little, Brown, 1983)

=== Memoir ===
- Vive moi! (Little, Brown, 1964)

=== Biography ===
- Constance Markievicz, or The Average Revolutionary (Jonathan Cape, 1934)
- The Autobiography of Theobald Wolfe Tone (Thomas Nelson, 1937)
- King of the Beggars: A Life of Daniel O’Connell (Thomas Nelson, 1938)
- De Valera (Penguin, 1939)
- The Great O'Neill (Duell, Sloan and Pearce, 1942)
- Newman's Way: The Odyssey of John Henry Newman (Devin-Adair, 1952)

=== Other ===
- The Silver Branch (1938)
- An Irish Journey (1940)
- The Story of Ireland (1943)
- The Irish: A Character Study (1947)
- The Short Story (1948)
- The Story of the Irish People (1949)
- A Summer In Italy (1949)
- An Autumn in Italy (1953)
- With the Gaels of Wexford (1955)
- The Vanishing Hero: Studies in Novelists of the Twenties (1956)

== Reviews ==
- Ritchie, Harry (1981), Collected O'Faolain, review of Collected Stories of Sean O'Faolain I in Murray, Glen (ed.), Cencrastus No. 6, Autumn 1981, p. 40.
