= Florence Ross =

- Born: 6 December 1870; Ulster, Ireland
- Died: 10 July 1949 (aged 78); Royal City of Dublin Hospital, Dublin
- Occupation: Artist
- Years active: 1906–48

Florence Agnes Ross (6 December 1870 – 10 July 1949) was an Irish painter and the cousin of John Millington Synge.

== Life and family ==
Florence Ross was born in Ulster on 6 December 1870. She was the youngest of three children of the Rev. William Steward Ross and Agnes Ross (née Traill). Very soon after, the family moved to 3 Orwell Park, Rathgar, Dublin to live with her maternal grandmother, Mrs Annie Traill. Mrs Traill other daughter, the widow Mrs Kathleen Synge, lived next door at 4 Orwell Park.

Ross and her cousin, John Millington Synge, grew up close together. They shared an interest in natural history and kept a joint notebook of their animal observations and drawings. In his autobiography, he wrote about his friendship with her, noting their childhood was the happiest time of his life. They did not remain as close in adulthood, but she and his sister attended his Trinity College, Dublin graduation.

In 1891 Ross lived with the Synges in Dún Laoghaire following the death of her mother, spending the summers with them at Castle Kevin, Annamoe, County Wicklow, passing the time drawing. She joined her brother in Tonga in 1895, where he was a doctor and she was his housekeeper. Over the next eleven years she visited New Zealand, Australia and Argentina, returning to Ireland in 1906.

Whilst in Ireland, Ross lived in Greystones, Clonlea, at various addresses in Dublin and finally Blackrock. She ran a sketching club near Glendalough. She died in the Royal City of Dublin Hospital on 10 July 1949.

== Artistic work ==
From 1906 onward, Ross dedicated her life to painting, primarily landscapes in watercolours. As she spent a great deal of time in County Wicklow with her cousin Elizabeth Synge, a large portion of her work is from there. She also travelled and sketched in counties Antrim, Donegal, Dublin, Galway and Kerry. Whilst on Great Blasket Island, she sketched the house Synge stayed in the "King's house". She exhibited with the Watercolour Society of Ireland from 1927 to 1948, showing around 90 paintings. From 1929 and 1938, her work was exhibited by the Belfast Art Society and Ulster Academy of Arts, plus eight paintings by the Royal Hibernian Academy. Her works were mostly landscapes, many including buildings. Her work has not been the subject of much critical attention. South Tipperary county museum and art gallery, Hugh Lane Gallery and the Waterford municipal collection all have examples of her work.
