= Muriel Brandt =

Irish artist (1909–1981)

- Muriel Brandt in 1976
- Born: 16 January 1909; Belfast, Ireland
- Died: 10 June 1981 (aged 72); Dublin, Ireland
- Known for: Painting
- Family: Ruth Brandt (daughter)

Muriel Brandt (16 January 1909 – 10 June 1981) was an Irish artist known for her portraiture and murals.

== Early life and family ==
Muriel Brandt was born Muriel McKinley in Colenso Parade, Belfast on 16 January 1909. Her parents were Florence Ann (née Furness) and Hugh McKinley. Her father was a post-office official. She had an older sibling. She studied at the Belfast College of Art from 1932 to 1933, and at the mural decoration department of the Royal College of Art in London, having won the Sorelba scholarship in 1934.

In 1935 she married Frank Brandt. He was a freelance designer. The couple had three children, including Ruth, who was also an artist. The couple returned to Ireland, and lived in Sutton, Dublin. Brandt was a keen gardener, with her fellow artist, James Nolan recalling her "passionate concern for the arts and the environment."

== Career ==
She was elected Associate Royal College of Art (ARCA) in 1937. Brandt began exhibiting with the Royal Hibernian Academy (RHA) in 1938, and went on to exhibit 145 paintings with them. Among her more notable works are child portraits and studies of her family and children. She was commissioned to produce murals for a number of religious buildings including the St Anthony's shrine in the Franciscan church of Adam and Eve in Dublin (1938–40). the Franciscan friary, Rossnowlagh, County Donegal (1954), and the Franciscan friary, Athlone (1975). In the Athlone mural, she included a portrait of herself, echoing the medieval tradition. She also created the stations of the cross for the Church of the Holy Cross, Sacramento, California and a church in Leeds. She also painted the Seven signatories for a pub in Ballymun.

Brandt was commissioned to design a postage stamp in 1949 to mark the international recognition of the new Irish Republic. In 1953 she exhibited with the Oireachtas, and in 1967 her painting Carrick Fergus won the gold Douglas Hyde medal at the Oireachtas. In 1965 the National Gallery of Ireland (NGI) featured her drawing of W. B. Yeats' home, Thoor Ballylee, as part of the Yeats centenary exhibition. She was appointed associate to the RHA in 1948 and full membership in 1962. She was commissioned to paint the portraits of many Dublin notables, among them Sir Alfred Chester Beatty and George O'Brien. One of her most famous works is the group portrait which hangs in the foyer of the Gate Theatre, Dublin which features Christine Longford, Hilton Edwards, and Micheál Mac Liammóir. Brandt also produced drawings for periodicals including Dublin Opinion and Ireland of the Welcomes, as well as illustrating Terence de Vere White's Leinster (1968). She was also a member of the United Arts Club, Dublin and a governor of both the RHA and NGI.

== Death and legacy ==
Brandt died in Dublin on 10 June 1981, and is buried in St Fintan's Cemetery, Sutton. Among the institutions which hold work by Brandt are the Art Gallery Society, Kilkenny, Crawford Municipal Gallery, Cork, Garter Lane arts centre, Waterford and the NGI. The National Self-Portrait Collection of Ireland in Limerick holds a self portrait of Brandt from 1954.
