= Susan Connolly (artist) =

Irish artist

- Born: 1976 (age 49–50)

Susan Connolly (born 1976), is a contemporary Irish abstract artist.

== Life and career ==
Born Susan Joy Connolly in 1976, she grew up in Sallins, Co Kildare and graduated from Limerick School of Art and Design before going on to complete an MFA in the University of Ulster. She then attended the National College of Art and Design in Dublin to complete her master's degree. She is working on a PhD in Ulster University where she works as an associate lecturer. She also lectures in Waterford Institute of Technology. She is currently based out of Belfast. Connolly has won a number of art awards including from Kildare County Council (2014), the WARP artist residency in Belgium (2010), a Travel and Training Award (2009), the DCR Guesthouse Residency in The Hague, Holland (2009) and the Golden Foundation in New York (2017).
