= Norah McGuinness =

Irish artist

- Born: Norah Allison McGuinness; 7 November 1901; Derry, County Londonderry, Ireland
- Died: 22 November 1980 (aged 79); Monkstown, County Dublin
- Education: Metropolitan School of Art, Chelsea Polytechnic
- Known for: Painting, Illustration
- Movement: Modern movement

Norah Allison McGuinness (7 November 1901 – 22 November 1980) was an Irish painter and illustrator.

== Early life and education ==
Norah McGuinness was born in Derry, County Londonderry on 7 November 1901. Her parents were coal merchant and shipowner, Joseph Allison of Lawrence Hill, Derry, and Jessie McGuinness. McGuinness was educated at Victoria High School. She attended life classes at Derry Technical School and, from 1921, having won a three-year scholarship, she studied at the Dublin Metropolitan School of Art under Patrick Tuohy, Oswald Reeves (1870–1967), and Harry Clarke. Through Clarke, she obtained a commission to illustrate Laurence Sterne's A Sentimental Journey (London, 1926). She attended the Chelsea Polytechnic in London where she was exposed to cubism and impressionism. In 1923, she won a medal from the Royal Dublin Society, and in 1924 another medal for drawing at the Tailteann competition.

She married the editor Geoffrey Phibbs in 1925, and they settled in Wicklow. They divorced in 1930 after Phibbs had left her more than once, notably for the poet Laura Riding.

== Career ==
and was involved in the literary and theatrical life of Dublin, designing for the Abbey and Peacock theatres including The only jealousy of Emer and Deirdre. She also illustrating W. B. Yeats’s Stories of Red Hanrahan (London, 1927). Yeats' was so impressed with her work that he dedicated the opening poem, Sailing to Byzantium, to her.

When her marriage broke down, her close friend Mainie Jellett suggested that she travel and study, beginning in Paris. She lived in Paris for two years to study under André Lhôte, adopting a form of cubism, but also influenced by George Braque, Maurice de Vlaminck, Raoul Dufy, and Jean Lurçat. In 1931, McGuinness spent time in Nagpur, India, with her sister where she met Moila Powell. Powell was an artist, and she became a friend and McGuinness' only pupil. Powell took up her Expressionistic style.

From there, she moved to Hammersmith, London, where she was a member of Lucy Wertheim's 'Twenties Group' and of the avant-garde London Group. From 1937 to 1939, she lived in New York, where she exhibited her paintings, created illustrations for Harper's Bazaar, and designed windows for Altman's department store on Fifth Avenue, having been inspired by Salvador Dali's window displays. Her work was shown alongside Jack Yeats and Nano Reid in an exhibition of Irish art at the gallery of Mrs Cornelius J. Sullivan. Her work was also shown at the Paul Reinhardt gallery. During her time in Dublin and London, she would spend every summer at her cottage in Rathmullan, County Donegal.

After New York, she returned to Ireland in 1939, settled in Dublin, and primarily painted. She designed windows for Brown Thomas from 1939 for over thirty years. She also returned to stage design, designing the set for the first production of Waiting for Godot by Samuel Beckett at the Abbey Theatre. Her work in the 1940s was more decorative and romantic, returning to a renewed exploration of cubism from the 1950s and 1960s. She was inclined to abstraction, but never painted fully abstract works.

McGuinness She helped found the Irish Exhibition of Living Art in 1943 and became its president in 1944 after the death of Mainie Jellett. She served as president until 1972. With Nano Reid, she represented Ireland in the 1950 Venice Biennale. This was the first time Ireland participated in this international exhibition. By 2017, the official list of artists representing Ireland since 1950 showed that the majority of artists chosen in the years since McGuinness and Reid's participation were women. She was elected an honorary member of the Royal Hibernian Academy in 1957 but later resigned.

In 1968, Trinity College Dublin mounted a major retrospective of her work, and the college awarded her a Litt.D. in 1973. In 1976, the Keys Gallery, Derry held the first exhibition of her work in her native city.

== Death and legacy ==
McGuinness died on 22 November 1980, in Monkstown, County Dublin. Her work featured in Irish Museum of Modern Art's 2013 "Analysing Cubism" exhibition.

== Work in collections ==
- Crawford Art Gallery, Cork
- Irish Museum of Modern Art
- National Gallery of Ireland
  - Portrait of Michael Scott
  - Portrait of Denis Johnston
  - The Startled Bird
- Dublin City Gallery The Hugh Lane
- Victoria and Albert Museum London
- Arts Council of Ireland
- Arts Council of Northern Ireland, including
  - Inlet (1976)
- Meath County Council, including
  - The Ochre Mines, Avoca (1955?)
- National Library of Ireland
