= Arts and Crafts Society of Ireland =

Fine Arts

The Arts and Crafts Society of Ireland was formed in Ireland in 1894 to promote Irish decorative and fine arts. The society held exhibitions to showcase these Irish arts.

== History ==
The Arts and Crafts Society of Ireland (ACSI) was founded in 1894, instigated by Dermot Bourke, 7th Earl of Mayo, with the aim of encouraging and sponsoring the development of artistic industries in Ireland. It held its first exhibition in 1895, opening on 7 November in the Royal University Buildings, Earlsfort Terrace, Dublin. It was broadly modelled on its British counterpart, the Arts and Crafts Exhibition Society. Along with holding exhibitions, the society also held lectures for both members and non-members. It also published exhibition catalogues, pamphlets, and reports.

In 1907, the ASCI founded the Guild of Irish Art Workers for professional craftspeople. The society was disbanded in 1925, after its seventh exhibition that year.

Amongst the member of the society were Harry Clarke, Richard Orpen, Robert Arthur Dawson, Rosamond Praeger, Oswald Reeves, Evelyn Gleeson, Alice Brittain and Alice Shaw. The members worked in varying media including leather, lace, metal, wood, stone, marble, stained glass and porcelain.
