= List of Irish botanical illustrators =

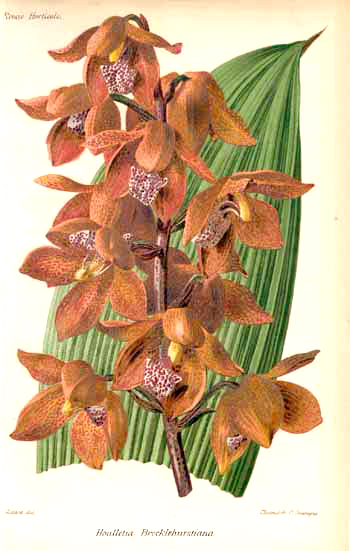
Botanical print of Houlletia brocklehurstiana

This is a list of botanical illustrators born or active in Ireland. Botanical illustration involves the painting, drawing and illustration of plants and ecosystems. Often meticulously observed, the botanical art tradition combines both science and art, and botanical artists throughout the centuries have been active in the collecting and cataloguing a huge variety of species.

== Irish botanical illustrators ==
=== A ===
- Lady Mabel Annesley (1881–1959 New Zealand)
- William Ashford (born England c.1746–1824)

=== B ===
- Anne Elizabeth Ball (1808–1872)
- Eileen Barnes (1876–1956)
- Moyra Barry (1886–1960)
- Rose Barton (1856–1929)
- Mary Battersby (c.1804–1841)
- Lady Edith Blake (née Bernal Osborne) (1845–1926)
- Samuel Frederick Brocas (c. 1792–1847)
- Mildred Anne Butler (1858–1941)

=== C ===
- Catherine Teresa Cookson (née Catherine Teresa Murray), also known as Mrs James Cookson
- Clare Cryan
- Lady Charlotte Wheeler Cuffe (née Williams) (born England 1867–1967), see also Irish plant collectors
- Fanny Currey (1848–1917)

=== D ===
- Mary Delany (1700–1788), born in England
- Samuel Dixon (c. 1748–1769)
- [[Andrew Doyle]] (1774–1841)
- George Victor Du Noyer (1817–1869)

=== E ===
- Frances Anne Edgeworth (1769–1864)
- Diana Conyngham Ellis (née Monsell) (1813–1851)
- John Ellis (c.1705–1776 England)

=== F ===
- Marianne Fannin, later Mrs Roberts (1848–1938)
- Robert David FitzGerald (1830–1892 Australia), see also Irish plant collectors
- Kathleen Fox (1880–1963)

=== G ===
- Barbara Gage (1817–1859)
- Catherine Gage (1815–1892)
- Robert Gibbings (1889–1958), grandson of Robert Day
- Elizabeth Gray (née Sharpe) (d. 1903)
- James Gwim (c. 1720–1769)

=== H ===
- Fr. Jack Hanlon (1913–1968)
- Gertrude Hartland (1865–1954)
- Grace Henry (1868–1953), born in Scotland
- William Henry Harvey (1811–1866 Torquay)
- Gerard Manley Hopkins (1844–1889), born in England
- William Howis (1804–1882)
- Philip Hussey (1713–1783)
- Ellen Hutchins (1785–1815), see also Historic Cork Gardens#Ardnagashel House

=== I ===
- Hans Iten (1874–1930), born in Switzerland

=== J ===
- Alice Jacob (1862–1921)
- Patricia Jorgensen (born 1936)

=== K ===
- William Kilburn (1745–1818)
- Martha King (c.1803–1897 New Zealand)

=== L ===
- Deborah Lambkin (born 1970)
- Sir John Langham (1894–1972)
- Grania Langrishe
- Susan Lecky (1837–1896)

=== M ===
- James Mannin (died 1779)
- Kathleen Marescaux (1868–1944)
- Samuel McCloy (1831–1904)
- Edward Henry Murphy (c.1796–1841)
- Rev Desmond P. Murray (1887–1967), born in England

=== N ===
- Andrew Nicholl (1804–1886 London)

=== O ===
- Dermod O'Brien (1865–1945)
- Geraldine O'Brien later Hely-Hutchinson (born 1922)
- Helen Sophia O'Hara (1846–1920)

=== P ===
- Raymond Piper (1923–2007), born in England
- Frederica Plunket
- Katherine Plunket (1820–1932)
- Caroline Pounds (née Elam) (fl.c.1846–c.1880)
- Sophia Rosamond Praeger (1867–1954)
- Frances Poskitt, (born 1944), born in England
- Sarah Purser (1848–1943)

=== Q R S ===
- Susan Sex
- Lydia Shackleton (1828–1914)
- Holly Somerville
- James Stuart (c.1802–1842)

=== T ===
- John Templeton (1766–1825)
- William Edward Trevithick (1899–1958)

=== U V W ===
- Wendy F. Walsh (1915–2014)
- Mary Ward (1827–1869)
- John White (c. 1577–1590), born in England
- Isaac Whitehead (c.1819–1881)
- David Wilson (1873–1935)

=== X Y Z ===
- Elizabeth Yeats (1868–1940)

== See also ==
- Irish National Botanic Gardens
- List of Irish artists
- List of Irish plant collectors
- The Ferns of Great Britain and Ireland
