= Charles Lamb (painter) =

Irish painter (1893–1964)

- Born: 30 August 1893; Portadown, County Armagh
- Died: 15 December 1964 (aged 71); Carraroe, County Galway
- Education: Belfast School of Art
- Alma mater: Dublin Metropolitan School of Art
- Known for: Landscapes & Portraits
- Style: Academic Realism

Charles Vincent Lamb (30 August 1893 – 15 December 1964) was an Irish landscape and portrait painter.

== Early life ==
Charles Vincent Lamb was born in Portadown, County Armagh on 30 August 1893. He was the son of a painter and decorator, and a Justice of the Peace, John Lamb. He was the eldest of seven children, having three sisters and three brothers. Lamb served an apprenticeship with his father where he won a gold medal as Housepainter of the Year in 1913.

He attended Portadown Technical School before studying life drawing at Belfast School of Art in the evenings. In 1917 he won a teaching-scholarship which took him to the Dublin Metropolitan School of Art for four years where he came under the tutelage of Seán Keating. Whilst studying Lamb befriended the Galway writer Pádraic Ó Conaire who encouraged him to visit, and paint the West of Ireland.

== Artistic career ==
Lamb was engaged as an art teacher at the Dublin Metropolitan School of Art in the summer of 1920. That same year, he showed six paintings, including Peasants of Clare, at the Gaelic League's Oireachtas exhibition, and he joined with Paul and Grace Henry, Letitia Hamilton, Harry Clarke, Mainie Jellett, Edward O'Rourke Dickey and Clare Marsh to form the Society of Dublin Painters. Their first exhibition was held at the St. Stephen's Green Gallery, Dublin, in August.

In 1921, Lamb debuted at the Fortieth Annual Exhibition of Belfast Art Society with five works including A Lough Neagh Fisherman, A Northern Cross-road Dance (previously on display at the Royal Hibernian Academy in the spring of 1921), and a portrait of fellow Ulster artist John Hunter. In review of Lamb's A Northern Cross-road Dance, one critic wrote,

"It is a wonderfully worked out conception, instinct with life and motion, and at the same time full of inherent grace. The line drawing is splendid and the colouring excellent, while in regard to detail, no feature of importance is overlooked."

In August 1921 Lamb was elected an Associate of the Belfast Art Society. He exhibited with the Belfast Art Society in two subsequent years, showing four watercolours in 1922 and six oils in 1923.

In 1923 Lamb was elected as Associate at the Royal Hibernian Academy, where he was accorded full membership in 1938.

Lamb was profoundly affected by the nationalism arising from the failed Easter Rising in 1916. Lamb first visited Carraroe in the Connemara Gaeltacht in 1921, where he found what he termed the 'National essence'. He returned to Carraroe in 1923 and visited the area frequently thereafter. In 1935 he built a cottage there where he remained until his death.

In the 1922 he travelled to Kent, Down, Donegal and Waterford, where he refined his landscapes into the style we are familiar with today. He also voyaged to Brittany where he found similarities with the west of Ireland.

Lamb returned to the Dublin Painters' Stephen's Green Gallery in early 1923 with his first solo exhibition where he presented landscapes from Carraroe and the West of Ireland, including Two Young Girls From Carraroe, and portraits of John Hunter and Mrs H Flood. The critic in the Dublin Evening Telegraph was concerned by Lamb's use of colour and the modernist brushstroke,

"To let a young artist loose in the West is an experiment not without its risks. The more sensitive he is to colour and form, the more difficult it is to keep his head, and, with pictures on all sides waiting to be painted concentration is no easy thing. That Mr Lamb has not escaped this temptation is not a grievous fault. Like a child given the run of a sweet shop, he often contents himself with a hasty summary where the effect he aims at depends upon the patient working out of technical problems."

In 1924, a solo show of Lamb's works was hosted by the John Magee Gallery in Belfast. Between 1926 and 1928 he divided his time betwixt a caravan on the Aran Islands and a house in Brittany. In 1926 Lamb exhibited with the Radical Painter's Group, of which little is known, but amongst his fellow exhibitors were Margaret Clarke, Jack B Yeats, Leo Whelan, Patrick Tuohy, Seán Keating and Paul Henry.

In the following year the Stephen's Green Gallery was once more a venue for a solo exhibition of Lamb's work. He showed around fifty works in total, with the majority "reflecting the light, life and atmosphere of the coast of Brittany", with a few from Connemara. Lamb showed at the same venue annually and in 1932 he displayed a further fifty oils in an exhibition dominated by works from the Gaeltacht, including A Connemara Woman. Writing of Lamb's 1934 exhibition at the Stephen's Green Gallery the Irish Times critic commented, "Better than the propagandists and politicians is Charles Lamb, the artist, as an advocate of the attractions of the Gaeltacht."

In 1928 Lamb exhibited in Boston for the first time. In each of the following two years he showed in New York, before exhibiting in London in 1931.

Lamb was included in an exhibition of modern Irish paintings and lace which travelled to Brussels as part of a trade mission in 1930. Lamb was joined by works from William Orpen, John Lavery, Dermot O'Brien, and James Humbert Craig. Upon their return to Ireland the paintings were displayed at the premises of the Irish Cottage Industries on Dawson Street Dublin before being broken up. In October 1930 Lamb was elected an honorary Academician of the Ulster Academy of Arts.

Lamb was amongst 540 artists from 31 countries who submitted work as part of the art competitions at the 1932 Summer Olympics in Los Angeles, where he showed A Galway Fisherman. Amongst his competitors where fellow countrymen John Lavery, Leo Whelan, Jack B Yeats, and James Humbert Craig. Lamb also competed in the 1948 Summer Olympics at the Victoria and Albert Museum, with the Curragh Races, Connemara, where Letitia Hamilton took bronze in the Oil and Water colours event with Meath Hunt Point-to-Point Races.

Lamb built a house in Carraroe in 1935 and also arranged his first annual exhibition and summer school in the same year. In 1936 Lamb showed A Connemara Woman Knitting at the Royal Academy of Arts in London.

Before the outbreak of World War II Lamb spent the winter of 1938 to 1939 in Germany. Thomas Bodkin cited Lamb as one of Twelve Irish Artists whose influence was important to the development of a distinct and 'modern school' of Irish painting, in a Victor Waddington publication of 1940.

When the Council for the Encouragement of Music and the Arts was formed in February 1943, Lamb was one of nineteen artists included in a loan exhibition entitled Living Irish Artists. Lamb was also included in The Collection of Zoltan Frankl exhibition organised by CEMA at the Belfast Museum and Art Gallery in the following year, which also included paintings by R O Dunlop and George Clausen. The CEMA Gallery at Donegall Place, Belfast was the venue for a solo exhibition of Lamb's work in autumn 1947.

The artist returned to his birthplace for an exhibition of landscapes and figure painting at his Father's business premises on Bridge Street, Portadown in December 1948.

In 1949 Lamb illustrated Máirtín Ó Cadhain's book Cre na Cille, often considered one of the greatest novels written in the Irish language.

Lamb's work was part of a collection sent to Boston and Ottawa by the Cultural Relations Committee in a 1950 exhibition entitled Contemporary Irish Paintings.

In 1951, as part of a national celebration of the Festival of Britain, fifty of Lamb's work featuring Irish scenes and people were exhibited in Portadown's town hall.

Lamb was represented by six oils at the 1954 annual exhibition of the Royal Hibernian Academy, where he showed with fellow Ulster Academicians William Conor and Frank McKelvey.

== Death and legacy ==
Charles Vincent Lamb died at his home in Carraroe on 15 December 1964. He was survived by his wife Katharine, two daughters and two sons. A retrospective was held at the Hugh Lane Municipal Gallery in Dublin in 1969.

His works can be seen in many public and private collections including the Ulster Museum, Hugh Lane Municipal Gallery, and the National Gallery of Ireland.
