= Una Watters =

Irish artist and librarian (1918-1965)

- A self-portrait
- Born: Una McDonnell; 4 November 1918; Dublin, Ireland
- Died: 20 November 1965 (aged 47)
- Occupations: librarian and artist

Una Watters (4 November 1918 – 20 November 1965) was an Irish artist and librarian. She was the artist who created the Claíomh Solais (Sword of Light) image used to commemorate the 50th anniversary of the Easter Rising in 1966.

== Life ==
Una Watters was born Una McDonnell in Dublin on 4 November 1918. She attended the Holy Faith Convent in Glasnevin and then the National College of Art and Design, where she was mentored by artist Maurice MacGonigal. During this time she also worked part-time as a librarian. Her husband was Eugene Watters a poet and writer known as Eoghan Ó Tuairisc whom she met at the Teacher's Club on Parnell Square. They were married on 10 March 1945.

Watters exhibited with the Royal Hibernian Academy between 1956 and 1965, alongside fellow artists William Leech, Louis le Brocquy, Harry Kernoff, Muriel Brandt, and her cousin Sean O’Sullivan. She was a member of the Society of Dublin Painters. Her work Annunciation was exhibited at the 1949 Irish Exhibition of Living Art. Her early works focus on religious subjects, with later subjects focusing on the everyday. She painted in the kitchen of the cottage she lived in with her husband at Cappagh Cross, Finglas. She primarily worked in oils and watercolours painting portraits and landscapes.

Later on in her career, she developed an angular, cubist style with her later works becoming more abstract showing modernist influences. As well as painting she was a draughtswoman and calligrapher, designing greetings cards and illustrating annuals and journals. In the 1960s she illustrated a series of booklets of religious meditations by her uncle Brian O'Higgins. Watters is known to have signed her paintings with a large, often italicised "UW" in capitals in the bottom left or right hand of the work.

Watters won an Arts Council Award in 1965 for which she produced her best-known work the Claíomh Solais. The image became the emblem of the 50th-anniversary commemoration of the Easter Rising. The image was used on badges, brooches, and tie pins as well as being featured on all of the official publications, featured on a first-day stamp and stickers to commemorate the events. Watters died suddenly on 20 November 1965; the £100 cheque from the Arts Council arrived on the morning of her funeral.

Watters was also a member of the Society of Dublin Painters alongside other female members such as May Guinness, Grace Henry, Mary Swanzy, Mainie Jellett and Evie Hone.

A year after her death, her husband organised a posthumous exhibition of 37 oil paintings at the Dublin Painters Gallery on St Stephen's Green. The Hugh Lane Gallery hold her painting The People’s Garden, and the library in which she worked, Phibsboro, still displays her painting The Four Masters. Navan Library also holds a painting which she painted of her Uncle, Brian O'Higgins. In an essay analysing Watters's work and the decline of her reputation after her death, Mary Morrissy suggested that "an ill-judged gesture by her distraught husband conspired to keep her work out of the public eye for over half a century." Following the 1966 exhibition, Ó Tuairisc gave away most of Watters's work to family, friends, and acquaintances, effectively dissipating her legacy.

In 2022, Morrissy curated a retrospective exhibition of Watters's work at the United Arts Club, Dublin, exhibiting 20 of the original 37 paintings from the 1966 memorial show alongside some newly discovered watercolours. In 2023, Watters's painting, Girl Going by Trinity in the Rain (1965), was gifted to the National Gallery of Ireland by Colbert Kearney.
