= May Guinness =

Irish painter

- Born: Mary Catherine Guinness; 11 March 1863; Rathfarnham, County Dublin
- Died: 16 July 1955 (aged 92); Dublin
- Style: Fauvism

May Guinness (11 March 1863 – 16 July 1955) was an Irish painter, noted as "the first practising artist to introduce a modernist sensibility into Irish art".

== Early life and education ==
Mary Catherine or May Guinness was born in Rathfarnham, County Dublin on 11 March 1863. She was the third of the seven children of solicitor, Thomas Hosea Guinness and Mary Davis, the only daughter and heiress of Charles Davis of Coolmanna, County Carlow. Through her father, she was a descendant of Arthur Guinness. She was educated at home, by both French and German governesses, and attending Mrs Power's school, leaving to teach her younger siblings. This responsibility resulted in her not pursuing art until she was in her 30s. She travelled with Mildred Anne Butler in 1894 to Newlyn in Cornwall to study under Norman Garstin.

== Career ==
Guinness was a member of the Water Colour Society of Ireland from 1892. She exhibited with the Royal Hibernian Academy in 1897, continuing to show with them until 1911. She spent a period of time painting in Florence from 1902 to 1903, and then in Paris in 1905. While there she saw the early work of Henri Matisse and the Fauves, which left a lasting impression on Guinness. Techniques such as free brushwork start to appear in her paintings, including Procession at Josselin and Cathedral at Diest. She studied with Kees van Dongen and Hermenegildo Anglada Camarasa between 1905 and 1922.

Guinness left Dublin in 1915 to enlist as a nurse in the French army. She worked from near the village of Vadelaincourt at Hospital No 12. While there, she recorded her experiences in a diary. In 1917 she was awarded the Croix de Guerre for her bravery during the Battle of Verdun. After the end of World War I she also received the Medal of French Gratitude. She spent winters in Paris from 1922 to 1925, working with the cubist artist André Lhote. Through Lhote, Guinness became close friends with Mainie Jellett and Evie Hone. Amongst her most well known works from this time is Still life, held in the Hugh Lane Gallery. She held a solo exhibition at the Galerie Visconti, Paris in January 1925. By the 1930s, she had returned to a more fauvist style.

A chronology of her work is difficult to establish as she never dated her works. Therefore her work is grouped into three periods: pre-1922, 1922 to 1925, and post-1925. This is further complicated by the fact she often assumed the style of other artists, but this openness seemed to make her work unique in Ireland. She continued to travel into her 70s, exposing herself to broad and new artistic influences and collecting modernist paintings including Matisse and Pablo Picasso. She painted local landscapes in Ireland, but also places such as Toledo, Greece and Palestine. This broad experience was influential on younger Irish artists such as Grace Henry and Mary Swanzy.

== Later life and legacy ==
Guinness was a private person, and became more reclusive in her later years. Her artistic output appears to have overcome this however. She lived in the family home in Tibradden after World War I. Following the death of her mother in 1925, she moved into an annexe at the home of Evie Hone at Marlay House, Rathfarnham. She moved back to Tibradden in 1933, living there until her death. Guinness died on 16 July 1955 in Dublin. The following year a memorial exhibition was held at Dawson Hall, Dawson Street. Her art collection was auctioned off after her death, with the funds raised being donated for the repair of the roof of St Patrick's Cathedral, Dublin.
