= Water Colour Society of Ireland =

Watercolour society in Ireland founded in 1870

Water Colour Society of Ireland (WCSI) is a watercolour society in Ireland, founded in 1870. The Society held its first exhibition in the Courthouse, Lismore, County Waterford in May 1871.

== History ==
The Water Colour Society of Ireland (WCSI) was founded in 1870 as the Amateur Drawing Society by an informal group of six well-connected women from County Waterford, Baroness Pauline Prochazka, Harriet Keane, Frances Keane, Henrietta Phipps, Fanny Currey and Fanny Musgrave. Eight years after its founding, the organisation briefly became the "Irish Fine Art Society" before settling to its current name in 1888. The stated objective of the Society is "to promote and develop nationally the use and appreciation of watercolour and associated media among artists, students and the general public."

== Exhibitions ==
The society held the first exhibition in 1871 at the courthouse in Lismore, County Waterford, and went on to exhibit at Clonmel, Carlow, and finally in 1891 the society begun an annual Spring Exhibition at Molesworth Hall, Dublin. The national collection for the society which consists of painting by 122 members was founded in 1993, and is housed at the Concert Hall of the University of Limerick. In 2004 the National Gallery held an exhibition, 150: The Watercolour Society of Ireland's Exhibitions. In 2009, the university published an illustrated book, The Silent Companion – An illustrated History of The Water Colour Society of Ireland. Almost 25,000 works by 1,200 artists are listed in the societies Exhibition List 1872–1994 (1994).

- Hugh Lane Municipal Gallery 1975 to 1980
- Bank of Ireland Exhibition Hall on Baggot Street from 1981 to 1988.
- Royal Hibernian Academy Gallagher Gallery, Ely Place, Dublin in 1989.
- Concourse Arts Centre at the Dún Laoghaire County Hall, County Dublin 1990–present.

== Notable members ==
Past members include:

- Elizabeth Thompson, Lady Butler
- Frederick William Burton
- Rose Maynard Barton
- Mildred Anne Butler
- Harry Clarke
- Gerald Dillon
- Lilian Davidson
- Phoebe Donovan
- Percy French
- Lady Ardilaun
- May Guinness
- Nathaniel Hone RHA
- Evie Hone
- Walter Osborne RHA
- Norah McGuinness
- Letitia Hamilton
- Paul Henry
- Mainie Jellett
- Harry Kernoff
- Frank McKelvey
- Grania Langrishe
- Flora Mitchell
- Sir William Orpen
- Bea Orpen
- Kitty Wilmer O'Brien PRHA
- Sarah Purser RHA
- Nano Reid
- Æ (George William Russell)
- Susan Sex
- Gladys Wynne
- Jack B. Yeats
- Anne Yeats

== See also ==
- List of Irish artists
- Royal Watercolour Society
- Royal Scottish Society of Painters in Watercolour
- Royal Hibernian Academy
