= Eva Henrietta Hamilton =

Irish artist

- Born: 28 June 1876; Dunboyne, County Meath, Ireland
- Died: 14 March 1960
- Education: Metropolitan School of Art, Slade School of Fine Art
- Known for: painting

Eva Henrietta Hamilton (1876–1960), an Irish artist, was a portrait, landscape, and watercolour painter.

== Life ==
Eva Henrietta Hamilton was born in Dunboyne, County Meath. She was a daughter of Charles Robert Hamilton of Hamwood, eldest of her sisters Amy (b. 1879) and Letitia Marion, and cousin of Rose Barton, the watercolourist. Eva was the great-granddaughter of the artist Marianne-Caroline Hamilton. Eva and her sister Letitia painted, exhibited and travelled together. Eva specialised in portraiture, particularly of children. She turned to landscape painting when she moved to Castleknock.

Eva was educated at Alexandra College, Dublin. She began exhibiting with the Water Colour Society of Ireland (WCSI) at the age of 22. Eva studied under Sir William Orpen at the Metropolitan School of Art. She went on to study under Henry Tonks at the Slade School of Fine Art. In 1904 she showed two portraits of her sisters at the Royal Hibernian Academy (RHA). She exhibited around 120 works at the Royal Hibernian Academy from 1904 to 1945, and also at the Irish International Exhibition in 1907. She belonged to the Ladies' Athenaeum Club in London although she was mainly based in Dublin. She also exhibited in London, Paris and Philadelphia. She died in Co. Dublin on 14 March 1960.

She painted such people as Lady Isabella Augusta Gregory. The National Gallery bought an oil painting of hers, called Rose Dorothy Brooke for £1,806.25, in 1997. She has a piece at the Model Arts Centre in Sligo.

== Works ==
- Moret sur Loing.
- Ceilidh at Dunboyne, 1919.
- Summer's day in the west.
- The canal bridge.
- View over Sligo Bay.
- Children on a grassy sand bank.
- Fiesole.
- Cottage in the West.
- SELF PORTRAIT, c.1906.
- On the Malahide Shore, 1921.
- FOREST WITH STREAM AND BRIDGE.
- Achill Street Scene.
- Portrait of her Sister Amy.
- Children at Portmarnock
- Holy Island from Mountshannon House, County Claire, 1947.
- A cottage on the Irish coast oil on board.
- Portrait of a girl standing
- Under a shady tree
- Castleknock
- Sheep in a Meadow.
- Mother and child.
- Driving Cattle at Ash Hill, the Maynooth to Dunboyne Road.
- The canal bridge.
- Girl on a Beach.
- Maynooth from the Duke's Pool on the Rye Water River, Co Kildare.
- The Estuary, Malahide
