= Charlotte Isabel Wheeler-Cuffe =

Irish botanical artist, collector and gardener

Lady Charlotte Isabel Wheeler-Cuffe
- Born: Charlotte Isabel Williams; 24 May 1867; Wimbledon, Surrey, England
- Died: 8 March 1967 (aged 99); Leyrath, County Kilkenny, Ireland
- Spouse(s): Otway Fortescue Luke Wheeler-Cuffe, 3rd Baronet (m. 1897; died 1934)
- Relatives: Pauline Prochazka (cousin-in-law)

Charlotte Isabel Wheeler-Cuffe, Lady Wheeler-Cuffe (née Williams; 24 May 1867 – 8 March 1967) was an Irish amateur botanical artist, collector and gardener active in British Burma.

== Early life and family ==
Wheeler-Cuffe was born Charlotte Isabel Williams on 24 May 1867 in Wimbledon, Surrey (present-day London) to William Williams, a solicitor and former president of The Law Society, and Rose Isabella Williams (née Langrishe). The maternal granddaughter of the politician and clergyman Sir Hercules Richard Langrishe, 3rd Baronet of Knocktopher, Wheeler-Cuffe was the niece of the architect and engineer Richard Langrishe (1834–1922). The youngest of two sisters, Wheeler-Cuffe was raised at the family home in Wimbledon and at Upperfold House in West Sussex. Frequently visiting Ireland during her childrenhood, Wheeler-Cuffe was nicknamed "Shadow" following a serious childhood illness. Wheeler-Cuffe was educated at home by a governess, and later studied painting under W. Frank Calderon.

On 3 June 1897, Wheeler-Cuffe married Otway Fortescue Luke Wheeler-Cuffe (later Sir Otway Fortescue Luke Wheeler-Cuffe, 3rd Baronet), a civil-engineer for the Public Works Department in British Burma. In 1915, following the death of Otway's uncle, Sir Charles Frederick Denny Wheeler-Cuffe, 2nd Baronet, Wheeler-Cuffe became Lady Wheeler-Cuffe.

== Career ==
Following her marriage, Wheeler-Cuffe settled in British Burma with her husband. Wheeler-Cuffe would sometimes accompanied her husband went on official inspection tours of the roads in remote regions. She described these tours in some of the hundreds of weekly letters to her mother. After her mother's death in 1916, she continued the routine of writing once a week to her husband's cousin, Baroness Pauline Prochazka (1842–1930) who then lived at Leyrath, Kilkenny. Another correspondent was Frederick William Moore, the Keeper of the Royal Botanic Gardens, Glasnevin, Dublin.

In 1911, on Mount Victoria – also called Nat Ma Taung – Charlotte Wheeler-Cuffe found two new species of rhododendron: Rhododendron burmacium, a low, busy shrub with pale yellow flowers and a second species, later named Rhododendron cuffeanum, which has white flowers and grows on pine trees. Living plants of both species were sent to the Royal Botanic Gardens, Glasnevin, where they grew and bloomed. Another plant from the mountain, known as Shadow's buttercup, was the blue-flowered Anemone obtusiloba f. patula. She was a keen gardener and would collect living plants in the wild and bring them into her garden, sometimes also sending material to family and friends in England and Ireland, including the exquisite Shan lily (Lilium sulphureum).

Wheeler-Cuffe was invited by the authorities to undertake the formation of a botanical garden at Maymyo (now Pyin U Lwin). She readily agreed and worked on the layout and planting of this garden between 1916 and 1921 when she and her husband left Burma. Around 1920 Wheeler-Cuffe published The Burma alphabet, a book illustrated by her watercolours. This was sold at five rupees a copy to raise funds for a new hospital, the Queen Alexandra's Children's Hospital, in Mandalay.

The couple later returned to Europe, and settled in the Cuffe family home at Leyrath, outside Kilkenny, Ireland.

== Personal life ==
On 8 March 1967, Wheeler-Cuffe died at Leyrath 11 weeks short of her one hundredth birthday.

== Legacy ==
Wheeler-Cuffe instructed that her watercolours of Burmese orchids and other plants should remain "indefinitely" in the National Botanic Gardens, Glasnevin. Later, her correspondence with her mother and Polly Prochazka was also deposited there by Captain Anthony Tupper, as well as a number of her sketchbooks. However, watercolours (landscapes of Ireland and Burma) and miscellaneous other items were sold when the contents of Leyrath were auctioned in September 1993, and so are widely scattered.

== See also ==
- List of Irish botanical illustrators
- List of Irish plant collectors
- Patricia Butler, Irish Botanical Illustrators, Antique Collectors Club, London 2000 ISBN 1-85149-357-3
