= Trevithick =

Trevithick (/trəˈvɪθɪk/ trə-VITH-ik) is a Cornish surname. Notable people with the surname include:

- Francis Trevithick (1812–1877), British locomotive engineer
- Jeremy Trevithick (born 2002), Spanish rugby union player
- Jonathan Trevethick (1864–1939), New Zealand politician
- Matthew Trevithick, American student, writer and researcher
- Paul Trevithick (born 1959), American inventor, engineer and entrepreneur
- Richard Trevithick (1771–1833), British inventor, mining engineer and locomotive engineer
- William Edward Trevithick (1899–1958), Irish botanical illustrator
