= Phoebe Donovan =

Irish artist (1902–1998)

Phoebe Donovan (1902 – May 1998) was an Irish flower, landscape and portrait artist.

== Biography ==
Phoebe Donovan was born in Wexford in 1902. She was educated privately before being sent to a French school in Wexford. Donovan began painting as part of a local art group. She then traveled to Rome and London. Donovan grew up on a farm and raised animals and sold eggs to gather the money needed to attend art college. Eventually Donovan attended the Dublin Metropolitan School of Art in 1927 and also the Royal Hibernian Academy Schools on St Stephen's Green. Seán Keating taught her portraiture.

Her first exhibition was with the RHA in 1931. She exhibited again in 1933 with the Water Colour Society of Ireland. In 1948 she was elected a member and served on the committee from 1954 to 1987. Throughout the 1930s and 1940s Donovan was a member of the Society of Dublin Painters.

She died in her childhood home, Ballymore, County Wexford, in May 1998.

== Solo exhibitions ==
- Old Stables Gallery, Ballymore, Camolin, Permanent Display
- Stephen O'Mara Gallery, Dún Laoghaire, 1990
- Corish Picture Gallery, Wexford, 1958, 1965, 1970
- Ritchie Hendricks Gallery, Dublin, 1956
- Charles Pilkington Showrooms, Dawson Street, Dublin, 1955
- Dublin Painters Gallery, 1951
- The Country Shop Dublin, 1950

== Group exhibitions ==
- Dún Laoghaire Arts Week, 1988
- Setanta Gallery, Dublin, 1977
- Graphic Studio retrospective Exhibition, 1976
- Dalkey Community Council, 1976 & 1987
- Municipal Gallery, Dublin, 1964
- Painters Group, 1961 & 1966
- Kilkenny Arts Society, 1961
- Munster Fine Art club, Cork, 1946
- Pastel Society, London, 1936
- Dublin Sketching Club, 1930
- Irish Watercolour Society, 1933 – 1997
