= Robert Manning (engineer) =

Irish surveyor and civil engineer (1816–1897)

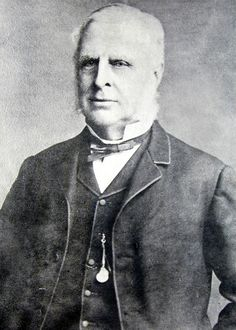
- Manning in 1872
- Born: 22 October 1816; Azincourt, Kingdom of France
- Died: 9 December 1897 (aged 81); 4 Ely Place, Dublin, Ireland
- Occupations: Surveyor; civil engineer
- Known for: The Manning formula
- Spouse: Susanna Manning (m. 1848)
- Children: 8, including: Mary Manning; Geraldine Manning

Robert Manning (22 October 1816 – 9 December 1897) was an Irish surveyor and civil engineer, best known for creation of the Manning formula.

== Early life and education ==
Manning was born on 22 October 1816 in Azincourt, Kingdom of France (present-day France) to William Manning (1783–1826), a lieutenant in the Wicklow Militia, and Ruth Manning (née Stephens; 1792–1854). The third of eight siblings, the family returned to Ireland following the death of his father in 1826. Settling in the village of Dromina, the family lived with Manning's maternal grandmother and uncle, John Stephens. Manning was privately educated in Kilkenny and Waterford.

== Career ==
From 1834 to 1845, Manning worked at his uncle's estate performing surveys, valuations and accounting. During this period Manning received instruction in civil engineering. Following the passing of the Drainage (Ireland) Act 1846, Manning entered into the Commissioners of Public Works in Ireland in January 1846. Working under Samuel Ussher Roberts, Manning was promoted to assistant engineer in October 1846.

In January 1848, Manning succeeded Roberts as district engineer for Ardee and Glyde in County Louth. As district engineer, he read "Traité d'Hydraulique" by d'Aubisson des Voissons, after which he developed a great interest in hydraulics. Entering into private practice in 1855, Manning was employed the following year by Arthur Hill, 4th Marquess of Downshire as the Marquess' personal engineer-surveyor. Between 1856 and 1858, Manning conducted a topographical survey of the Marquess 120,000 acres of land in County Down, County Wicklow and King's County (present-day County Offaly). Following the completion of the topographical survey, Manning continued to work for the Marquess until his death in August 1868. During this period Manning also supervised the construction of the Dundrum Bay Harbour in County Down and designed a water supply system for Belfast. On 2 August 1869, Manning rejoined the Commissioners of Public Works as second engineer to the chief engineer William Forsyth.

Manning succeed Forsyth as chief engineer on 1 April 1874, and remained in the role until his retirement in 1891. In 1866, Manning was awarded the Telford Medal by the Institution of Civil Engineers for his paper "On… the flow of water off the ground in the Woodburn District near Carrickfergus".

=== Manning Formula ===
Manning did not receive any education or formal training in fluid mechanics or engineering. His accounting background and pragmatism influenced his work and drove him to reduce problems to their simplest form. He compared and evaluated seven best known formulae of the time for the flow of water in a channel: Du Buat (1786), Eyelwein (1814), Weisbach (1845), St. Venant (1851), Neville (1860), Darcy and Bazin (1865), and Ganguillet and Kutter (1869). He calculated the velocity obtained from each formula for a given slope and for hydraulic radii varying from 0.25 m to 30 m. Then, for each condition, he found the mean value of the seven velocities and developed a formula that best fitted the data.

The first best-fit formula was the following:

$V = 32 \left[ RS \left( 1 + R^{1/3} \right)\right]^{1/2}$

He then simplified this formula to:

$V = C R^{x} S^{1/2}$

In 1885, Manning gave $x$ the value of 2/3 and wrote his formula as follows:

$V = C R^{2/3} S^{1/2}$

In a letter to Flamant, Manning stated: "The reciprocal of C corresponds closely with that of n, as determined by Ganguillet and Kutter; both C and n being constant for the same channel."

On 4 December 1889, at the age of 73, Manning first proposed his formula to the Institution of Civil Engineers (Ireland). This formula saw the light in 1891, in a paper written by him entitled "On the flow of water in open channels and pipes," published in the Transactions of the Institution of Civil Engineers (Ireland).

Manning did not like his own equation for two reasons: First, it was difficult in those days to determine the cube root of a number and then square it to arrive at a number to the 2/3 power. In addition, the equation was dimensionally incorrect, and so to obtain dimensional correctness he developed the following equation:

$V = C (gS)^{1/2} \left[ R^{1/2} +\left( \dfrac{0.22}{m^{1/2}} \right)\left( R - 0.15 m \right) \right]$

where $m$ = "height of a column of mercury which balances the atmosphere," and $C$ was a dimensionless number "which varies with the nature of the surface."

However, in some late 19th century textbooks, the Manning formula was written as follows:

$V = \left(\dfrac{1}{n}\right) R^{2/3} S^{1/2}$

Through his "Handbook of Hydraulics," King (1918) led to the widespread use of the Manning formula as we know it today, as well as to the acceptance that the Manning's coefficient $C$ should be the reciprocal of Kutter's $n$.

In the United States, $n$ is referred to as Manning's friction factor, or Manning's constant. In Europe, the Strickler $K$ is the same as Manning's $C$, i.e., the reciprocal of $n$.

== Personal life ==
In 1848, Manning married his second cousin Susanna Gibson . The couple had 8 children, including the painter and teacher Mary Manning and the suffragette Geraldine Manning.

Manning died in his home at 4 Ely Place on 9 December 1897 and was buried at Mount Jerome Cemetery.
