= Pauline Prochazka =

Irish water-colourist (1842–1930)

Pauline Harriet Prochazka Baroness
- Born: 1842; Prague, Bohemia, Austrian Empire
- Died: 1930 (aged 87–88); Kilkenny, Ireland

Pauline Prochazka (1842–1930) was a water-colourist and one of the founders of the Water Colour Society of Ireland.

== Life ==
Baroness Pauline Prochazka was the daughter of Ottokar, Baron Prochazka, Field Marshal Lieutenant in the Austrian Army, and Leopoldine Henrika Gersch, step-daughter of the late Baron Stuart de Decies, of Dromana, County Waterford. Although born in Prague, she left Bohemia very young and was brought up in Ireland.

She founded the Water Colour Society of Ireland in 1870 with a group of six women in Waterford. It was founded initially as the Amateur Drawing Society. Eight years later it was renamed to the "Irish Fine Art Society".

Prochazka was an accomplished and award-winning water-colourist and became manager of the Royal Irish School of Art Needlework in 1886. She ran the school for twelve years.

She was a niece to Sir Charles Wheeler Cuffe and thus related to the illustrator Charlotte, Lady Wheeler-Cuffe. She lived in Lyrath house in County Kilkenny. Her death was announced in the Irish Times of 24 April 1930.
