= Letitia Marion Hamilton =

Irish artist

- Born: 30 July 1878; Dunboyne, Ireland
- Died: 11 August 1964 (aged 86); Dublin, Ireland
- Education: Dublin Metropolitan School of Art, Slade School of Fine Art

Medal record

Art competitions

Representing Ireland

Olympic Games
Bronze medal – third place	1948 London	Oils and watercolours

Letitia Marion Hamilton (30 July 1878 – 11 August 1964) was an Irish landscape artist. She was awarded a bronze medal in the Art competitions at the 1948 Summer Olympics.

== Life ==
Letitia Marion Hamilton was born in Hamwood House, County Meath on 30 July 1878. She was the daughter of Charles Robert Hamilton and Louisa Caroline Elizabeth Brooke. She attended Alexandra College. Letitia and her sister Eva were great-granddaughters of the artist Marianne-Caroline Hamilton, and cousins of watercolourist Rose Maynard Barton. The sisters' father could only afford one dowry, so Letitia and Eva remained unmarried, with their artistic careers helping to support the household. Both Hamilton and her sister studied at the Dublin Metropolitan School of Art under William Orpen. Hamilton studied enamelling there also, winning a silver medal in 1912 by both the School and the Board of Education National Commission. Her work showed elements of Art Nouveau, foreshadowing her later modernist leanings. Hamilton also studied in Belgium with Frank Brangwyn and the Slade School of Fine Art.

== Artistic career ==
Slieve Donard, County Down, circa 1935

Hamilton first exhibited in 1902, she would go on to become a prolific painter of the Irish countryside, exhibiting more than 200 paintings at the Royal Hibernian Academy (RHA). Both sisters travelled widely in Europe, with Letitia being influenced by modern European artistic trends of the early 20th-century. Hamilton was internationally exhibited, Royal Academy of Arts, Burlington Gallery and Kensington Art Gallery in London, in Scotland, and Paris. Her exposure to impressionism came from studying with Anne St John Partridge in France. Hamilton's style matured in the 1920s. That year, she was one of the founding members of the Society of Dublin Painters, along with Paul Henry, Grace Henry, Mary Swanzy, and Jack Butler Yeats. It was around this time that she changed her signature from MH (May Hamilton) to LMH, reflecting her full name. Hamilton worked on small oil sketches, which would later develop into finished works. Her style was rapid, with loose, fluid brush strokes. In the early 1920s, Hamilton travelled to Venice, painting on a gondola studio lent to her by artist and friend Ada Longfield. The works from this trip are considered amongst her best, with her exploring light effects, pastel shades, and strong outlines. Hamilton later employed these elements into her works on Irish landscapes.

She became a member of the RHA in 1943. In 1948 she became the last person to win a bronze medal at the art competitions at the London Olympic Games. Hamilton served as president of the Society of Dublin Painters in the late 1950s. Despite her failing eyesight later in life, Hamilton continued to paint, mounting her final exhibition in 1963, a year before her death. She was also a committee member of the Water Colour Society of Ireland.

Examples of Hamilton's work are held in a number of collections, including Hugh Lane Gallery, Limerick City Gallery of Art, Crawford Art Gallery, Ulster Museum, National Gallery of Ireland, and Waterford Art Gallery. Her painting Canal Scene In Venice attained the highest price for a Hamilton work in 2004, which sold at Sotheby's, in London, for £33,600. One of her paintings, the View of Lough Mask was expected to be sold for €9,000 to €12,000 in 2004.
