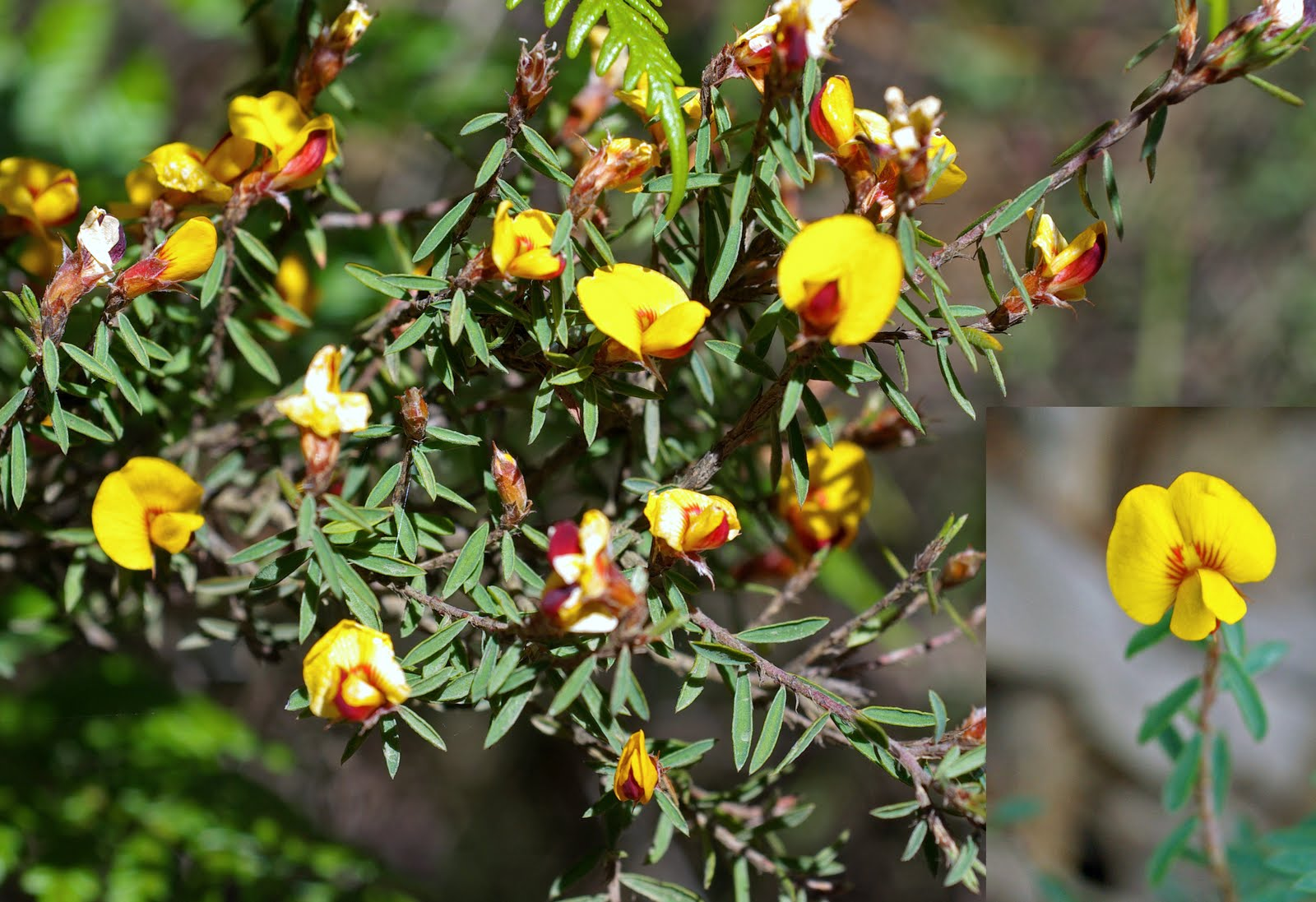

Scientific classification
- Kingdom: Plantae
- Clade: Tracheophytes
- Clade: Angiosperms
- Clade: Eudicots
- Clade: Rosids
- Order: Fabales
- Family: Fabaceae
- Subfamily: Faboideae
- Genus: Pultenaea
- Species: P. reflexifolia

Binomial name
- Pultenaea reflexifolia (J.H.Willis) de Kok

Synonyms
- Pultenaea muelleri var. reflexifoliaJ.H.Willis

= Pultenaea reflexifolia =

Wombat bush-pea

Species of flowering plant

Pultenaea reflexifolia, commonly known as wombat bush-pea, is a species of flowering plant in the family Fabaceae and is endemic to isolated parts of Victoria. It is an erect shrub with its foliage covered with tangled hairs, and has elliptic to narrow egg-shaped leaves with the narrower end towards the base, and yellow and red pea-like flowers arranged singly or in pairs on the ends of short side branches.

== Description ==
Pultenaea reflexifolia is an erect shrub that typically grows to a height of up to 1 m (3 ft 3 in) and has its foliage covered with tangled hairs. The leaves are elliptic to narrow egg-shaped with the narrower end towards the base, 5–10 mm (0.20–0.39 in) long and about 1 mm (0.039 in) wide and turned downwards with stipules 3–4 mm (0.12–0.16 in) long at the base. The flowers are yellow and red, arranged in one or two leaf axils on the ends of short side branches with papery, broadly egg-shaped bracts 1–3 mm (0.039–0.118 in) long at the base. The sepals are 5–6 mm (0.20–0.24 in) long with glabrous, broadly egg-shaped bracteoles 3–5 mm (0.12–0.20 in) long at the base of the sepal tube. Flowering occurs in November, the standard petal is 6–9 mm (0.24–0.35 in) wide and the fruit is a hairy pod.

== Taxonomy and naming ==
Pultenaea muelleri was first formally described in 1864 by George Bentham in Flora Australiensis from specimens collected by Ferdinand von Mueller and by "W.S. Whan" near Skipton in about 1860. James Hamlyn Willis considered that specimens found in the mountains of Gippsland were "strikingly dissimilar", being a "small wiry shrub" rather than a "tall shrub with spreading foliage" of the typical form. He considered these dissimilar plants to be a variety he named Pultenaea muelleri var. reflexifolia, published his description in The Victorian Naturalist and since it was found in the Skipton-Wombat Forest, proposed the common name wombat bush-pea. In 2003, Rogier Petrus Johannes de Kok raised the variety to species status as Pultenaea reflexifolia in Australian Systematic Botany.

== Distribution and habitat ==
Wombat bush-pea is restricted to scattered areas of dry forest west of Melbourne.
