= Mabel Young =

British artist

- Born: 18 August 1889; Ryde, Isle of Wight
- Died: 8 February 1974 (aged 84); Bray, County Wicklow, Ireland
- Resting place: St Patrick's churchyard, Enniskerry, County Wicklow
- Spouse: Paul Henry

Mabel Young (18 August 1889 – 8 February 1974) was a British artist, who spent her career painting in Ireland.

== Early life ==
Mabel Florence Young was born in Ryde, Isle of Wight, on 18 August 1889. She was the youngest of seven children of Emma and William Henry Young, owner of a coaching business. Young was educated in Ryde, but due to a decline in her father's coach business after the advent of the motor car, she became a seamstress. She moved to Dublin in 1914 to work as an assistant to her sister, the housekeeping manager of the Shelbourne Hotel. She evaded gunfire on Easter Monday 1916 as she walked home from a day the Phoenix Park via O'Connell Bridge. During the civil war, on 1 July 1922 Young barely escaped a stray bullet that was shot through her living-room window and lodged in the wall. In 1924, Young met Paul Henry whilst holidaying in Kilmacanogue, County Wicklow, becoming his student and lover, until she discovered he was married to Grace Henry. She then went to run a guesthouse at Carrigoona Cottage, Kilmacanogue. A frequent visitor was the writer Mary Manning, who later used her time in the cottage as inspiration for the play Storm over Wicklow (1933).

== Artistic career ==
In 1928, Young exhibited for the first time with the Royal Hibernian Academy (RHA) with the painting, Sugar Loaf mountain. She continued to exhibit with the RHA until 1961, showing 32 works in total. The Sugar Loaf mountain was also exhibited at the Helen Hackett Gallery, New York as a show of Irish paintings in 1928. Henry moved in with Young at Carrigoona Cottage in 1929, building a studio there. She contributed to the Tailteann Games exhibition of Irish art in 1932. Young went on to hold her first solo exhibition in 1933 at the Country Shop, St Stephen's Green, Dublin. During the summer of 1938, she and Henry visited the Twelve Bens area of Connemara, where Henry was collecting material for his autumn exhibition. In 1939 she exhibited Summer flowers in a vase in Dublin at a solo show. The Combridge Fine Art Gallery at the Shelbourne Hotel showed her a number of her paintings in 1940, primarily of Wicklow scenes, such as Lough Dan and the Sally Gap, and some areas of the south of France. Young's painting, The white rocks, Killarney, was exhibited at the Hotel in 1942. In 1944, she exhibited The beech wood in November with the RHA, and in the same year was featured in a show at Goodwin Galleries, Limerick, Irish Artists.

When Henry lost his sight, Young transcribed the manuscript of his autobiography from his dictation around 1946 and 1947. The resulting book, An Irish portrait (1951), was dedicated to her. The couple moved to 1 Sidmonton Square, Bray, County Wicklow in 1950. After the death of Grace Henry in 1953, Young and Paul married in 1954. Young was featured in the An Tóstal exhibition at the International Hotel, Bray in 1954, with paintings such as Lough Mask and Dingle Bay, Co. Kerry. She continued to paint after Henry's death in 1958, holding a solo show at the Ritchie Hendriks Gallery, Dublin in 1962.

== Later life and legacy ==
Young was a relatively unknown artist, painting in a loose impressionistic style. She specialised in watercolour and oil studies of Wicklow woods and glens, but there is a lack of depth in her work. Young died in a private nursing home on 8 February 1974, and is buried in St Patrick's churchyard, Enniskerry, County Wicklow. The Ulster Museum holds her notebooks, and the Hugh Lane Gallery holds a watercolour, Autumn beech trees, and an oil-on-board flowerpiece. The majority of her watercolours are held in private collections.
