= Mary Manning =

Mary Manning may refer to:

- Mary Manning (artist) (1853–1930), Irish painter and teacher
- Mary Manning (writer) (1905–1999), Irish novelist, playwright and film critic
- M. Lisa Manning (born 1980), American physicist
- Mary Emma Manning (1869–1936), better known as May Lillie, American sharpshooter and equestrian
- Mary Manning, shop worker who led the 1984 Dunnes Stores strike against the sale of produce from apartheid South Africa

== See also ==
- Mary Mannering (1876–1953), English actress
- Marie Manning (disambiguation)
