= List of Irish plant collectors =

This article is a list of historical Irish plant collectors. An important part of taxonomy and botany is the collection of samples from different locales.

- John Ball (1818–1889), first president Alpine Club, 1858–1860
- Evelyn Booth (1897–1988), parts of her collection are in the National Botanic Gardens, Glasnevin
- Patrick Browne, doctor and botanist in Jamaica
- Thomas Coulter (1793–1843), collected plants in North and Latin America
- Lady Charlotte Wheeler Cuffe (née Williams) (1867–1967)
- Michael Pakenham Edgeworth (1812–1881), born in Edgeworthstown, County Longford; namesake of genus Edgeworthia
- Eugene Fitzalan (1830–1911), born in Derry; collector, nurseryman, and poet
- Robert D. FitzGerald (1830–1892), born in Tralee; botanist, artist, collector; collected orchids
- Dr. A. Gogarty, sent plants, seeds, orchids, ferns and bulbs to the Irish National Botanic Gardens
- William Henry Harvey (1811–1866), born in Limerick, collected plants in South Africa 1848–66
- Augustine Henry
- James Keys (1841–1916), born in Irvinestown, County Fermanagh
- Edward Madden, from Kilkenny
- John Madden (1837–1902), Clones, County Monaghan; claimed in his North American expeditions to have introduced the Douglas fir
- Robert Patterson (1802–1872), Belfast, collected in Ireland, Australia
- Samuel Alexander Stewart
- Whan William Taylor (1829–1901), born in Moneymore, County Londonderry
- William Thomas Locke Travers (1819–1903), born in Dundalk

== See also ==
- List of Irish botanical illustrators
- The Ferns of Great Britain and Ireland
