= Geraldine Manning =

Irish suffragette (1864–1956)

Geraldine Eleanor Manning (Note: Also cited as Georgina.) (10 January 1864 – 1956) was an Irish suffragette. In 1913, Manning vandalised a bust of John Redmond at a Royal Hibernian Academy exhibition in protest of the Irish Parliamentary Party failure to support the Women’s Franchise Bill in the House of Commons.

Manning was born on 10 January 1864 in Hillsborough, County Down to Robert Manning, a surveyor and civil engineer, and Susanna Manning (née Gibson; died 1894). One of eight siblings, Manning was the sister of the painter and art teacher Mary Manning. In 1956, Manning died in Dublin aged 92.
