= Four Element Composition =

Painting by Mainie Jellett

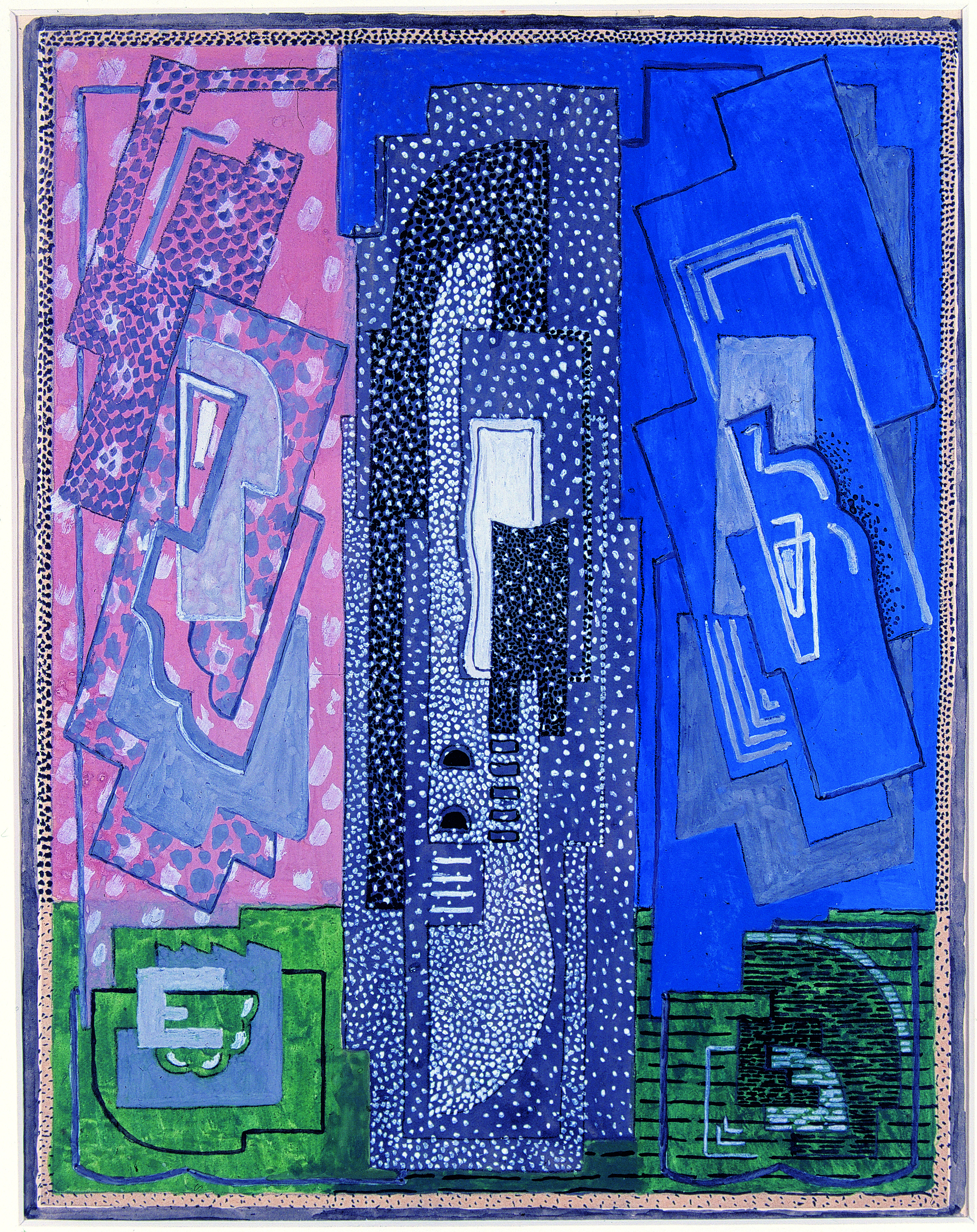
- Artist: Mainie Jellett
- Year: 1930
- Type: gouache on paper
- Dimensions: 28 cm × 21.5 cm (11 in × 8.5 in)
- Location: Irish Museum of Modern Art; Dublin

Four Element Composition is a gouache on paper by Mainie Jellett from 1930.

== Description ==
The gouache measures 28 × 21.5 centimeters. It is in the collection of the Irish Museum of Modern Art in Dublin.

== Analysis ==
Four Elements suggests an influence from the four Evangelists from the Book of Kells. Jellett combined Celtic illuminated manuscripts and Cubism.
