= Marie Manning =

Marie Manning may refer to:

- Marie Manning (writer) (1872–1945), American newspaper columnist and novelist
- Marie Manning (née de Roux)

== See also ==
- Mary Manning (disambiguation)
