= Rose Maynard Barton =

Irish artist

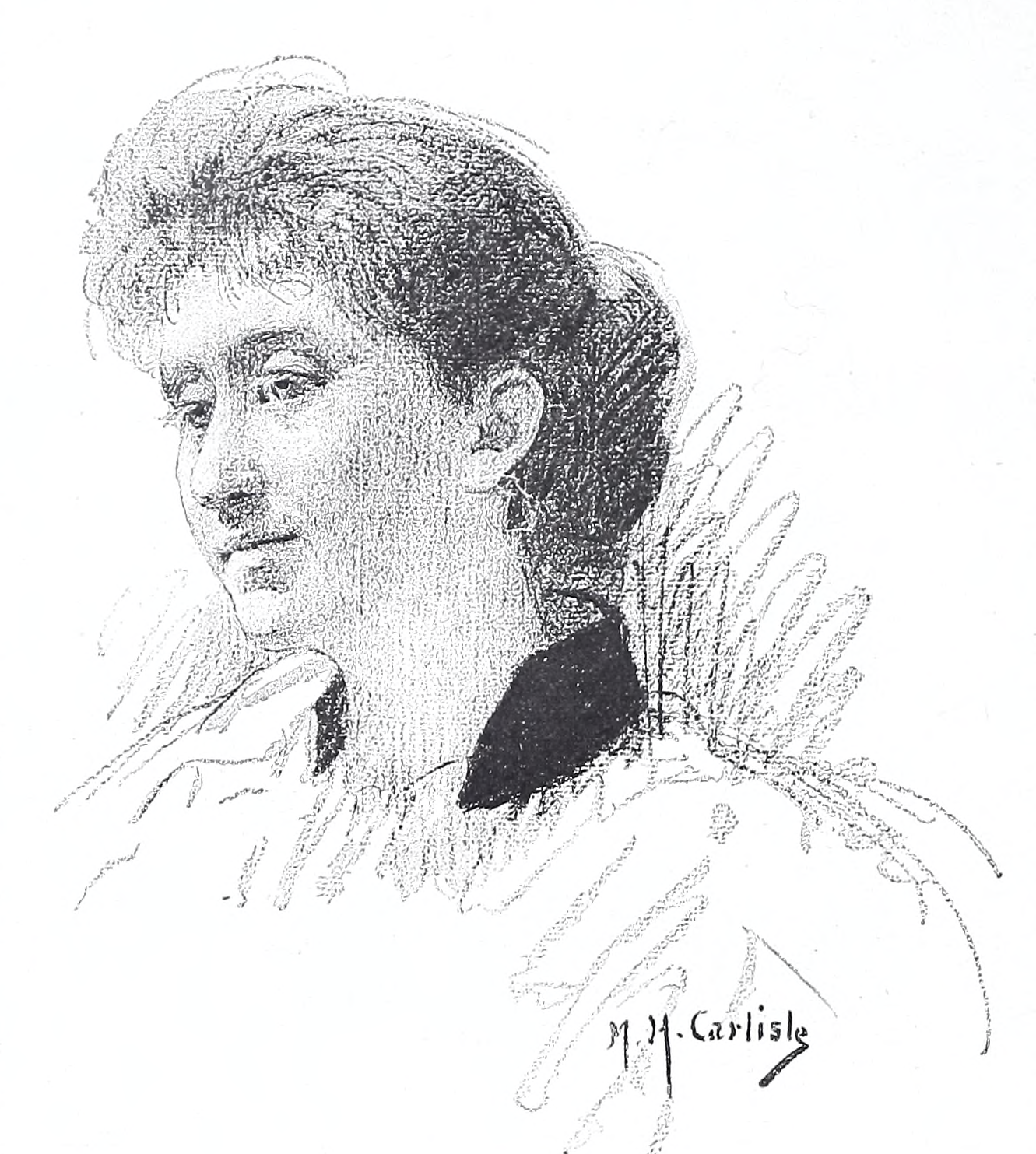
- portrait by Mary Helen Carlisle
- Born: 21 April 1856; Rochestown
- Died: 10 October 1929; Knightsbridge
- Occupation: Painter

Rose Mary Barton RWS (Dublin 21 April 1856 – 1929) was an Anglo-Irish artist; a watercolourist who painted landscape, street scenes, gardens, child portraiture and illustrations of the townscape of Britain and Ireland. Barton exhibited with a number of different painting societies, most notably the Watercolour Society of Ireland (WCSI), the Royal Academy (RA), the Royal Hibernian Academy (RHA), the Society of Women Artists and the Royal Watercolour Society (RWS). She became a full member of the RWS in 1911. Her paintings are in public collections of Irish painting in both Ireland and Britain, including the National Gallery of Ireland and Dublin City Gallery The Hugh Lane in Dublin, and the Ulster Museum in Belfast.

== Life ==
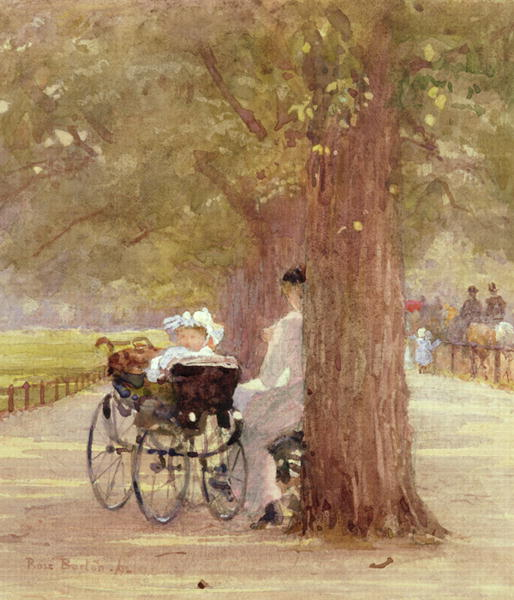
"A rest in rotten row" - 1892 watercolour by Rose Maynard Barton (1856 - 1929). The painting shows a nurse and child resting on Rotten Row, Hyde Park, London.

Rose Barton was born in Dublin in 1856. Her father was a lawyer from Rochestown, County Tipperary, and her mother family was from County Galway. Educated privately, she was a liberal in social affairs. Her interests included horseracing. She was cousins with sisters, Eva Henrietta and Letitia Marion Hamilton. She began exhibiting her broad-wash watercolours painting with the Watercolour Society of Ireland (WCSI) in 1872. Rose and her sister Emily visited Brussels in 1875, they received drawing tuition in drawing and fine art painting under the French artist, Henri Gervex. There along with her close friend Mildred Anne Butler she began to study figure painting and figure drawing. In 1879, she joined the local committee of the Irish Fine Art Society. Afterwards she trained at Paul Jacob Naftel's art studio in London. Rose like Butler, studied under Naftel. In 1882 she exhibited her picture Dead Game, at the Royal Hibernian Academy (RHA). In 1884, she exhibited at the Royal Academy (RA). Later, she showed at the Japanese Gallery, the Dudley Gallery and the Grosvenor Gallery in London. In 1893, she became an associate member of the Society of Painters in Water Colours, attaining full membership in 1911.

Barton's watercolours and townscapes were becoming well known in both Dublin and London. This was helped by her illustrations in books of both cities including Picturesque Dublin, Old and New by Francis Farmer and her own book Familiar London.

== Works ==
- The Garden of Lindsey House, London. 1917
- Going to the Levée at Dublin Castle. 1897
- Hop Pickers in Kent Returning Home. 1894
- A Rest in Rotten Row. 1892
- Charing Cross Bridge, London. 1896
- The Carlyle statue, Chelsea
- The Carlyle statue, Chelsea
- College Green, Dublin
- Evening On The River Liffey With St. John's Church In Distance
- Hyde Park Corner, With Household Cavalry
- Nelson's Column In A Fog
- Westminster Abbey

== Cited ==
- Huish, Marcus B. (1904), "Rose Barton, A.R.W.S", British water-colour art (First ed.), The Fine Art Society, A. & C. Black, p. 82, ISBN 978-1-4437-6842-9.
- McCormack, W. J. (2001), "Barton, Rose (1856-1929) Watercolourist", The Blackwell companion to modern Irish culture, Wiley-Blackwell, p. 82, ISBN 978-0-631-22817-2.
- Kelly, John S. (2005), John Kelly; Ronald Schuchard (eds.), The Collected Letters of W.B. Yeats: 1905-1907, vol. 4, Oxford University Press, ISBN 978-0-19-812684-3, OCLC 0198126840.
