= Henry Rosborough Swanzy =

Irish ophthalmic surgeon

Henry Rosborough Swanzy (1843 - 12 April 1913) was an Irish ophthalmic surgeon. He was a former President of the Royal College of Surgeons in Ireland and was influential in the merger of St Mark's Ophthalmic Hospital with the National Eye and Ear Infirmary to become Royal Victoria Eye and Ear Hospital. He was connected to the Adelaide Hospital, Dublin.

Swanzy was born in 1843, the son of John Swanzy. He attended University of Dublin, completing studies with a master's degree then took further studies in medicine at Trinity College. He also studied in Germany and thereafter worked for Albrecht von Graefe, a famous oculist. During the Austro-Prussian War and Franco-German War, he served as a surgeon for the German army.

In 1888, he gave a speech at the Bowman lecture which enhanced his reputation within the medical community. Thereafter, he wrote a well received article on the relation between eye symptoms with spinal cord and brain diseases. In 1906, he became the President of the Royal College of Surgeons.

== Personal life ==
In August 1874, Swanzy married Mary Knox Swanzy (née Denham; died 1909). Together they had five children, of which two died in infancy, including the painter Mary Swanzy. The family resided at 23 Merrion Square, Dublin.

On 12 April 1913 Swanzy died at his Dublin home and was later buried at Mount Jerome cemetery.
