= Clare Marsh =

Irish artist

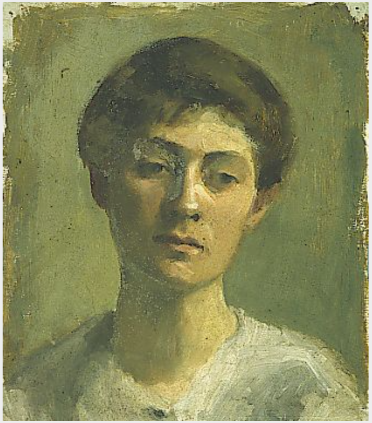
- Born: 13 January 1875; Bray, County Wicklow, Ireland
- Died: 5 May 1923 (aged 47)

Clare Marsh (13 January 1875 – 5 May 1923) was an Irish still life and portrait artist.

== Early life and family ==
Clare Marsh was born Emily Cecil Clare Marsh 13 January 1875 at New Court, Bray, County Wicklow, the house of her maternal grandfather, Andrew McCullagh, a wine merchant. Her parents were Arthur and Rachel Marsh (née McCullagh). She had 4 siblings. Her family were descended from the Anglo-Irish aristocracy, specifically from Francis Marsh of Edgeworth in Gloucester with his wife the great-aunt of James II's first wife. The family later moved to Raheen, Clondalkin, and later to Cappaghmore, Clondalkin. There is little information about her early life. She was involved in the suffrage movement.

== Career ==
Marsh met Mary Swanzy at May Manning's art classes, with Swanzy remembering Marsh as being from "a background of impecuniosity, which did not apparently worry them in spite of a more affluent upbringing". Marsh was influenced artistically by her aunt and John Butler Yeats, with whom she became close friends. In summer of 1898, Yeats painted Marsh's portrait at Manning's studio. Marsh was more drawn to the work of Yeats than of his son, Jack, and modelled her portraits on that of the older Yeats. He mentored her, encouraging her to see other artists' work as much as possible and saying "to produce a picture will force you to think." He urged her to paint more industriously. She exhibited with the Royal Hibernian Academy (RHA) for the first time in 1900 with East wind effect and Roses. Yeats later claimed that Marsh helped him with "line drawing or sketching, by putting him on the track of bulk drawing."

Alongside Manning's classes, she took night classes in sculpture with John Hughes and Oliver Sheppard at the Metropolitan School of Art. Aside from a trip to Paris in 1910 or 1911, Marsh seems to have been taught exclusively in Dublin throughout her 20s. She took a course at Norman Garstin's studio in Penzance, and stayed in North Wales in 1914, painting two Trearddur Bay scenes. Marsh painted still life and portraits, including one of Lily Yeats. It appears that her portraits of children and dogs were popular based on her submitted works to the RHA, exhibiting without a break from 1900 to 1921. The Hugh Lane Gallery holds her portrait of Lord Ashbourne, which demonstrates her painting style of loose brush strokes with an air of informality. Yeats suggested that she spend some time in the United States, where he was living at the time. She spent two months in New York, staying with cousins at White Plains and then moved into a room neighbouring that of Yeats in Petitpas. Her uncle strongly disproved of this living arrangement, so she left and returned to Ireland in January 1912, which upset Yeats greatly.

Upon her return from New York, Marsh started holding classes at her studio at South Anne Street which Swanzy recalled were "well liked and always full", with Mrs Susan Yeats becoming a pupil. Marsh became the Professor of Fine Arts at Alexandra College in 1916. In the same year, Marsh painted the fires and destruction of the 1916 Easter Rising. She painted a portrait of Jack Butler Yeats in 1918, which is now held by the Highlanes Gallery. John Butler Yeats later sympathised with her in a letter that she and other women were not elected members of the RHA. Knowing that Yeats was in financial difficulty, she sold some of his drawings and sent the money to him. It appears that over time, Marsh worked more with colour, as demonstrated in her portrait of Mrs Susan Yeats. Her final paintings were night studies, some of which show a possible influence from Swanzy with whom she shared a studio in autumn 1920. She is also believed to have been one of the founding members of the Society of Dublin Painters.

== Death and legacy ==
Marsh died on 5 May 1923. A posthumous exhibition of her work was held in October 1923. Due to her early death, Marsh largely fell into obscurity until one of her works was included in the 1987 "Irish Women Artists from the Eighteenth Century to the Present Day" exhibition and publication from the National Gallery of Ireland. The National Gallery of Ireland holds a selection of sketches and paintings by Marsh, and a sketch of her by Swanzy. She was included in an exhibition of art by women artists at the Highlanes Gallery in 2012.
