= Susan Lecky =

Irish botanical artist

- Born: 27 September 1837; Cork, County Cork, Ireland
- Died: 22 October 1896 (aged 59); London, England
- Known for: flower painting

Susan Lecky (27 September 1837 - 22 October 1896) was an Irish artist and flower painter.

== Life ==
Susan Lecky was born in Cork on 27 September 1837. From 1863 onwards, she spent time in Valentia Island, County Kerry, where her father managed a local slate quarry. She was encouraged by Edward William Cooke, a marine and landscape artist, to focus on local flora. Her work is likened to Diana Conyngham Ellis in style. Lecky exhibited with the Royal Hibernian Academy four times with flower painting between 1880 and 1886. The Royal Botanic Gardens, Kew, hold three drawings by Lecky, presented by her brother John after her death. Lecky died in London on 22 October 1896. Some of her works are in the collection of the Crawford Art Gallery.
