= Catherine Gage =

Irish botanist

- Born: 18 May 1815; County Down, Ireland
- Died: 16 February 1892 (aged 76); Rathlin Island, County Antrim, Ireland
- Resting place: Rathlin Island
- Known for: botanical and ornithological illustration
- Notable work: illustrated Birds of Rathlin Island
- Parent(s): Rev. Robert Gage, Catherine Boyd

Catherine Gage (18 May 1815 – 16 February 1892) was an Irish botanist, botanical and ornithological illustrator. As a botanist, she was known for her drawings and collections of Rathlin Island plants. She also painted over five hundred watercolours of birds on the island.

== Life ==
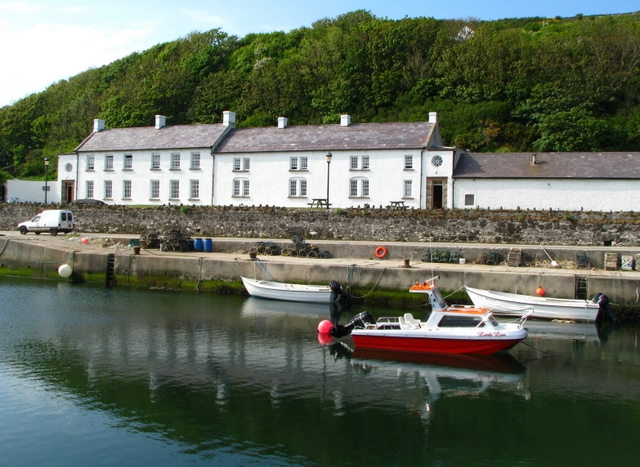
Gage's home, Manor House, Rathlin Island

Catherine Gage was born in County Down on 18 May 1815, the daughter of Rev. Robert Gage and Catherine Boyd (1791–1852). Gage's mother was a historian who wrote a two-volume history of Rathlin Island. Gage lived her entire life in the family home, Manor House on Rathlin Island. Gage died on 16 February 1892 and was buried on Rathlin Island.

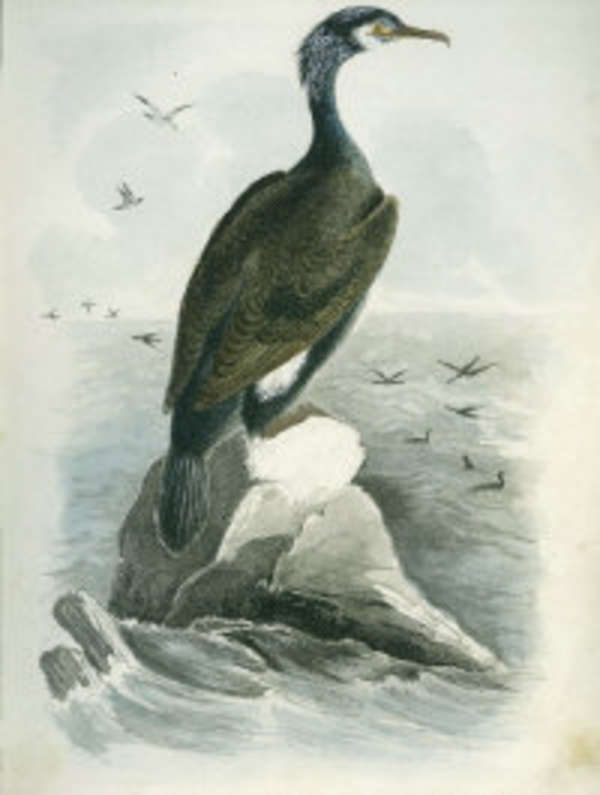
Plate from The Birds of Rathlin

== Illustration work ==
Gage seems to have devoted a large portion of her life to illustrating a book by her brother Robert Gage on the birds of Rathlin Island that was never published. The book was styled on that of John James Audubon's The Birds of America. During the course of this work she produced over five hundred watercolours of birds. She also collected and illustrated local plants, creating a list for the Botanical Society of Edinburgh, the abstract for which was published in the 1850 Annals and Magazine of Natural History. She also worked with her sister, Barbara Gage (1817–1859), illustrating the local flora as well as the fauna. Robert Gage did publish a list of the birds of the island, and Catherine Gage recorded 220 species of plants, 4 mammals and around ninety-five types of birds, as well as a number of marine mammals.

Gage died on 16 February 1892. When the folio of bird illustrations was auctioned in 2010, they were sold for €13,500.
