= Marianne-Caroline Hamilton =

Irish artist (1777–1861)

- Born: Marianne-Caroline Tighe; 1777; Rossana, County Wicklow
- Died: 9 July 1861 (aged 90); Dominick Street, Dublin
- Known for: Reminiscences of Marianne-Caroline Hamilton (1777–1861)
- Spouse: Charles Hamilton

Marianne-Caroline Hamilton (1777 – 29 July 1861) was an Irish artist and memoirist. Her memoirs, Reminiscences of Marianne-Caroline Hamilton (1777–1861), were published in 2010.

== Early life and family ==
Marianne-Caroline Hamilton was born in 1777 at Rossana, County Wicklow. She was the second daughter of landowner and MP for Athboy, William Tighe, and Sarah (née Fownes). William Tighe was a friend of John Wesley who used Rossana as his base from which to preach in Ireland. Sarah Tighe was the heir of Sir William Fownes, and Lady Elizabeth Fownes (née Ponsonby). Hamilton spent a great deal of her youth at Harrow, England, where her younger brother was attending boarding school, and in London. The family holidayed in Ireland, which she preferred due to the space and freedom she had there. Hamilton received a comprehensive education from a number of governesses, a master for arithmetic, and her brother's tutor providing Latin tuition. Her main interest was art however, later confessing to avoiding Latin classes to draw. She travelled with her family, spending time in France, Flanders, and Holland, with the family returning to live in Ireland in 1795. John Inigo Spilsbury was employed as her drawing master, during which time she reached the skill level of a professional artist.

She married Charles Hamilton, of Hamwood House, Dunboyne, County Meath in April 1801. Charles was a land agent for the Dukes of Leinster. The couple had six children, Sarah, Caroline Elizabeth, Mary, Charles William, William Tighe, and Frederick John Henry Fownes. Hamilton educated her children herself, which left little time to paint. From her writings it is evident she was deeply involved in the running of Hamwood and its gardens.

== Literary work ==
Hamilton transcribed a number of albums of poetry, with contributions from Thomas Moore and Hamilton's cousin and sister-in-law Mary Tighe. Thomas Campbell wrote a poem in tribute to her, The stanzas on painting. She wrote a history of her family, detailing the lives of Theodosia and Mary Blachford, and Sarah Ponsonby. Ponsonby bequeathed all of her private papers to Hamilton.

== Memoir and legacy ==
Hamilton wrote in a satirical style, providing a critical depiction of the Anglo-Irish ascendancy from that period. Her best known works include Domestic happiness as acted in the city: a tragic comic farce, The Kingston to Holyhead packet, and Society. Her family memoir was purchased by the National Library of Ireland from the estate of her descendant William Howard in the 1970s. The memoir was published in 2010 as the edited volume Reminiscences of Marianne-Caroline Hamilton (1777–1861).

Hamilton died at her Dublin home, 40 Dominick Street, on 29 July 1861. Some of her drawings at still kept at Hamwood. Desmond Fitzgerald and Professor Anne Crookshank used Hamilton's drawings in books covering the history of art in Ireland. Her great-granddaughter was artist Letitia Marion Hamilton.
