= Wheeler-Cuffe baronets =

Extinct baronetcy in the Baronetage of Ireland

The Wheeler-Denny-Cuffe, later Denny-Wheeler-Cuffe, later Wheeler-Cuffe Baronetcy, of Leyrath in the County of Kilkenny, was a title in the Baronetage of Ireland. It was created on 30 December 1800 for Jonah Wheeler-Denny-Cuffe. He later assumed the surname of Denny-Wheeler-Cuffe and served as Mayor of Kilkenny in 1823. The second and third Baronet used the surname Wheeler-Cuffe only. The title became extinct on the latter's death in 1934. The third Baronet was succeeded by his sister, Pauline Florence Elizabeth. The baronetcy was the last created in the Baronetage of Ireland.

The family were descended from Jonas Wheeler, Bishop of Ossory, who died in 1640, and his son Oliver, who settled at Grenane, County Laois. Their descendant Sir Richard Wheeler, father of the first baronet, adopted the additional surname Cuffe on inheriting the estate of his maternal grandfather, Denny Cuffe.

Charlotte, Lady Wheeler-Cuffe, wife of the third Baronet, was a botanic artist and collector.

== Wheeler-Denny-Cuffe, later Denny-Wheeler-Cuffe, later Wheeler-Cuffe baronets, of Leyrath (1800) ==
- Sir Jonah Denny-Wheeler-Cuffe, 1st Baronet (c. 1769–1853)
- Sir Charles Frederick Denny Wheeler-Cuffe, 2nd Baronet (1832–1915)
- Sir Otway Fortescue Luke Wheeler-Cuffe, 3rd Baronet (1866–1934)

Coat of arms of Wheeler-Cuffe of Leyrath
Crest An armed man embowed Azure, holding a baton Gules. Escutcheon Argent, on a bend indented Sable, three fleure-de-lis of the Field, between two cottises Azure, each charged with three bezants. Motto Animus tumen idem
