= Caroline Pounds =

Irish botanical painter in Australia

- Born: Caroline Elam; Ireland
- Died: 1898; Ireland
- Known for: watercolours of birds and plants of Australia and News Guinea
- Relatives: Charles J. W. Pfoundes (son)

Caroline Pounds (née Elam) (fl. 1840–1880) was an Irish watercolour artist. She produced studies of plants and birds of New Guinea and Australia.

== Life ==
There is little known about Caroline Pounds. She was born Caroline Elam and a descendant of Yorkshire Quakers, the daughter of Lt. Joseph Elam (d. 1829). She married Dr James Baker Pounds, Protestant apothecary and entrepreneur, of New Ross, County Wexford (d. 1884). The couple's eldest son, Joseph Elam Pounds, was born in 1838 at Moathill, County Waterford. The family had emigrated to Sydney around 1846, as they appear to have been bankrupted by the Irish Famine. Dr Pounds' obituary stated that he initially worked in Ballarat, Victoria. Having lost a large amount of money on imported mining machinery he intended to sell, he worked as the medical officer at HM Prison Pentridge until 1862. He was then appointed the corner for the Sandhurst (Bendigo) district, retiring in 1877. After this, he and Pounds travelled to places such as Japan to visit their youngest son, Charles J. W. Pfoundes. More recent research into their son Charles, indicates that the couple separated when he was 6 years old in 1846, that he was raised solely by his father and that he emigrated to Australia alone. Most of Pounds' work is undated, but that which is marked 1846. Bocking believes that Pounds did not live in Australia continuously, rather she spent a period of time there in 1846 before returning to Ireland where she died in 1898.

Their elder son Joseph, who was a widower with two children, married Lilias Ibbotson of Geelong in 1874. Pounds' drawings were discovered in the Ibbotson's family home, The Heights, by the Victoria National Trust in the 1980s and they remain there on display.

== Artistic work ==
Pounds produced a small number of plant and bird studies in Australia and New Guinea, which are believed to date from the 1840s to the 1880s. Subjects include Dianella, Rosehip, and Blackberry, as well as a New Guinea bird of paradise. They are painted in an oriental style, showing influence from Chinese and Japanese export art. This is possibly due to the fact that their youngest son served the Emperor of Japan and was a Government interpreter. The paintings are decorative, executed in a chinoiserie style on rice paper.
