= William Howis =

Irish artist

- Born: 1804; County Waterford, Ireland
- Died: 7 October 1882 (aged 77–78); Old Men's Asylum, Northbrook Road, Dublin

William Howis or William Howis the elder (1804 - 7 October 1882) was an Irish artist.

== Early life and family ==
William Howis was born in County Waterford in 1804. His father was the artist, Edward Howis, who was known for his animal painting. The family were Presbyterian. Howis attended the Royal Dublin Society schools from 1821, winning prizes there in 1823 and 1826. By 1828 he was living at 9 Portland Place, and exhibited his first work with the Royal Hibernian Academy (RHA). He married Dorothea Rogers, a widow, in 1825. They had two sons, William, who was also an artist, and James. The family moved to 28 Mabbot Street (now James Joyce Street) from 1834 to 1837, he then moved to 15 Henry Street from 1838 to 1848, which has been the home of artist Henry Brocas, and later 18 Henry Street. At both Henry Street addresses, Joseph le Petit was also a resident. He then moved to 17 Mary Street in 1849, and at this address both his son, James, and his wife died in late 1849. This house was destroyed by fire in 1854, when he moved to his final address which was 22 Jervis Street.

== Career ==
He exhibited regularly with the RHA until 1863. In 1863 he visited the RHA exhibition to find his paintings had been removed from their original place to a more obscure one. In anger, Howis cut the painting nearest to him from its frame, and never exhibited again. He is primarily known for his landscapes, and made copies after James Arthur O'Connor with some being mistaken for originals. He also painted portraits, including of Sir James Dombrain the Inspector General of the Coastguards of Ireland, which was later lithographed by Lowes Dickinson.

== Later life and death ==
Howis entered the Old Men's Asylum, Northbrook Road, in November 1873 where he lived until his death on 7 October 1882. Some of the sketch books from his time in the Asylum are now held in the National Gallery of Ireland and contain comic sketches of his fellow residents. Accounts of Howis state that he could speak both Irish and Hebrew. He bequeathed his books to the Abbey Presbyterian Church, Rutland Square.
