= Frank McKelvey =

Irish painter (1895–1974)

Frank McKelvey (3 June 1895 – 30 June 1974) was an Irish painter from Belfast.

== Early life and education ==
Francis Baird McKelvey, also known as Frank McKelvey, was born 3 June 1895. He was born in Belfast at 31 Woodvale Road. He was baptised at Saint Matthew's Parish Church. His parents William and Mary McKelvey had six children, three sons and three daughters. McKelevy was the second oldest. William, his father, was a decorator and painter.

McKelvey attended Mayo Street National School in Belfast. When he was 16 he became a lithographer apprentice to the firm, David Allen & Sons. They produced postcards, posters and notices. McKelvey enrolled in the Belfast College of Art part time by attending evening classes until he left his employment in 1911 to study full-time. Alfred Rawlings Baker, McKelvey's art master, had great influence on him during his time at art college. McKelvey received numerous awards for his artworks including the Sir Charles Brett Prize, the Fitzpatrick Prize, and the Taylor Art Competition.

== Career ==
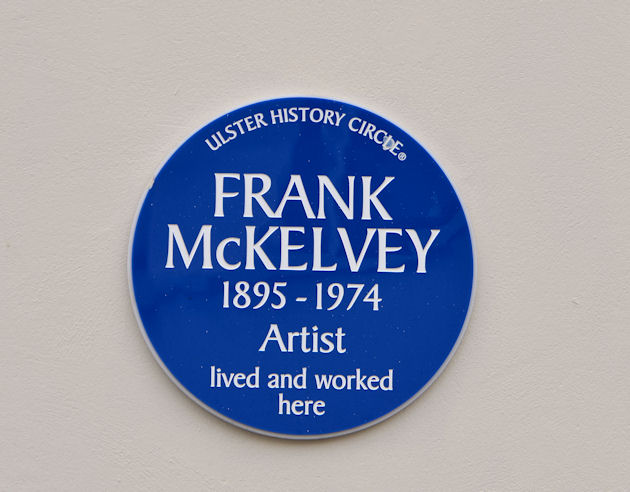
Plaque to McKelvey

He returned to David Allen & Sons in 1917 for a short period of time before he began to focus on painting and opened his own studio in 1920. The studio was located in Rea's Building, Royal Avenue, Belfast.

By 1918 his work was exhibited at the Royal Hibernian Academy and in 1921 he was elected a member of the Belfast Art Society. McKelvey was appointed an associate of the RHA in 1923, being granted full membership in 1930. During his career McKelvey was considered on a par with Paul Henry and James Humbert Craig, two of the most successful Irish landscape painters of the time. He was elected as one of the first academicians of the Ulster Academy of Arts when it was founded in 1930. McKelvey died on 30 June 1974.
