= Isaac Whitehead =

Irish artist

- Born: c. 1819; Dublin, Ireland
- Died: 21 April 1881 (aged 61–62); 50 Punt Road, Prahran, Melbourne, Australia

Isaac Whitehead (c. 1819 – 1881) was an Irish-Australian artist who worked in watercolour and pastel. He was also a picture framer and art promoter.

== Life ==
Isaac Whitehead was born in Dublin around 1819. His parents were Ann (née Studdard) and Joseph Whitehead. His father was a carver and gilder. While still in Dublin, Whitehead began his career in drawing, with a style that is likened to James Arthur O'Connor and Thomas Sautelle Roberts. He started his picture framing business from 5 Church Lane, Dame Street. He married Rebecca Mailey at age 19 before they emigrated.

It is believed that Whitehead emigrated to Victoria, Australia with his family around 1853 or 1858. Whitehead died at his home 50 Punt Road, Prahran, Melbourne, on 21 April 1881.

== Career ==
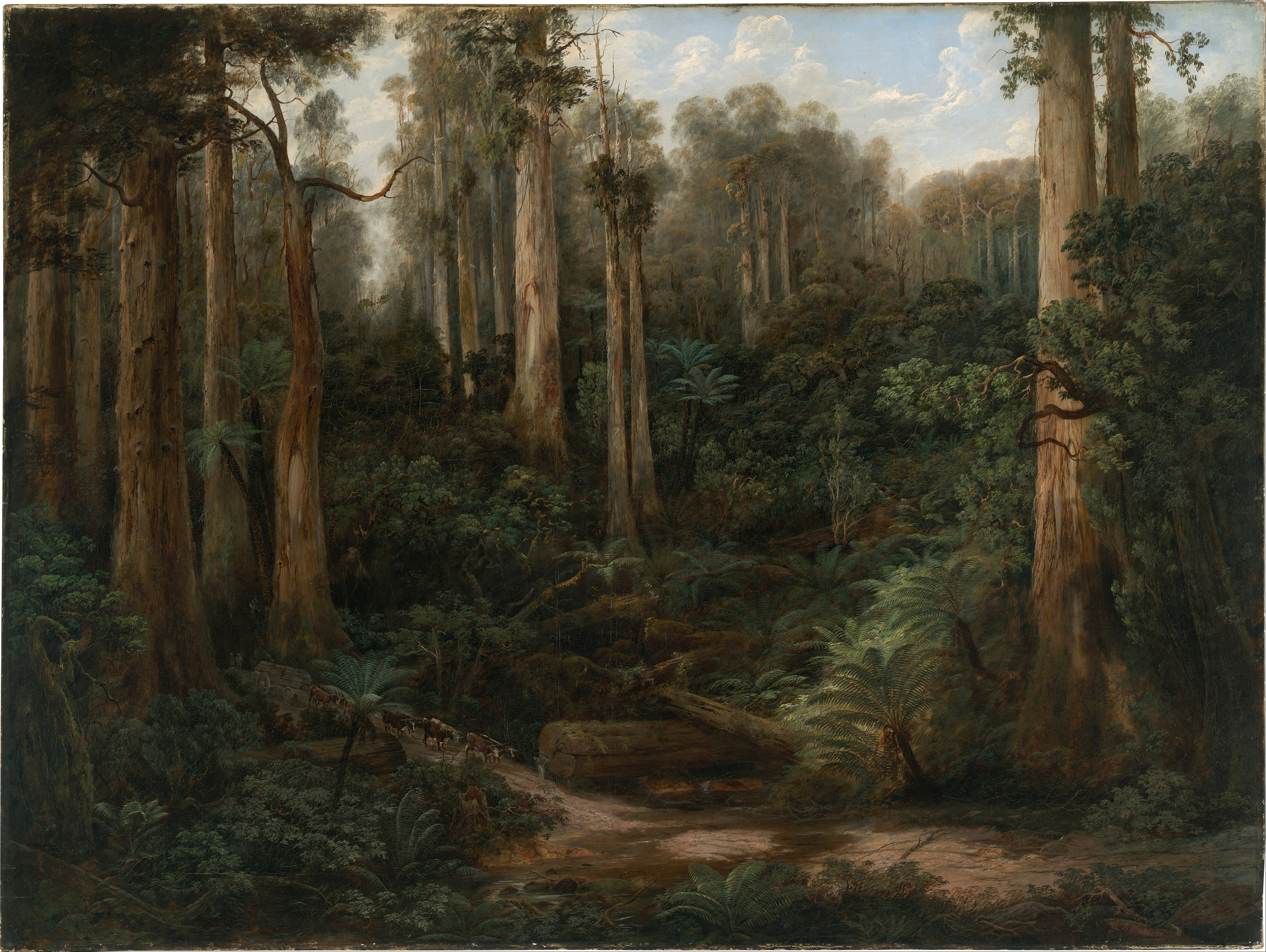
A Sassafras Gully, Gippsland (c. 1870)

Whitehead had established himself as the foremost picture framer in Melbourne by 1860, known for his highly ornate frames with floral decorations. Among the clients to his framing business were Louis Buvelot, Nicholas Chevalier, and Eugene von Guérard.

In his own paintings, he painted a number of scene of the forests of Gippsland, Victoria. His work focused on the rich landscapes with trees and ferns, with a high degree of botanical detail. There is no evidence he visited New Zealand, but he produced two seascapes of the New Zealand coast, Ocean Beach (Back Beach, Sorrento) and Entrance to Anita Bay, Milford Sound, New Zealand. He was a member of both the New South Wales Academy of Art and the Victorian Academy of Arts. He won at two awards for his work, first a medal at the 1875 Victorian Intercolonial Preparatory to the Philadelphia Centenary Exhibition, and secondly a silver medal at Paris Universal Exhibition in 1878. His work was posthumously exhibited at 1884 Victorian Jubilee Exhibition, the 1886 London Colonial and Indian Exhibition, and the 1888 Melbourne Centennial Intercolonial Exhibition.
