= Catherine Teresa Cookson =

Irish botanical artist

- Born: Catherine Teresa Murray; County Wicklow, Ireland
- Known for: botanical painting
- Notable work: Flowers Drawn and Painted in India, (c. 1834–35)

Catherine Teresa Cookson or Mrs James Cookson (née Murray) (fl. 1830s) was an Irish botanical artist, who documented some of the botany of India.

== Life ==
Catherine Teresa Murray, appears to have been from County Wicklow, was the daughter of a P. Murray. Little is known of her life, but it has been assumed that she is the wife of George James Cookson (1805–1838), a member of the Bengal Artillery, whom she married on 8 June 1832. Her husband died of smallpox on 20 January 1838.

== Artistic work ==
The work that she is known for is Flowers Drawn and Painted in India, which was published around 1835. Cookson wrote and illustrated the volume, and it is her only known work. The volume contains 31 botanical drawings of indigenous Indian plants. The plates are hand-coloured lithographs. The bound album was presented to the Royal Botanic Garden Edinburgh Library by Queen Elizabeth II on the opening of the new Herbarium and Library building in 1964.
