= William Edward Trevithick =

Irish botanical and commercial artist

- Born: 30 April 1899; Headfort House, Kells, Ireland
- Died: 1958 (aged 58–59); Ruislip, Middlesex, England
- Occupations: botanical and commercial artist

William Edward Trevithick (30 April 1899 - 1958) was an Irish botanical illustrator who contributed some 60 botanical plates to Curtis’s Botanical Magazine. He was later known for his commercial work in advertising.

== Life ==
Trevithick was born on 30 April 1899 while his father, William Edward Roberts Trevithick (1858–1929), was a gardener to Lord Headfort in his estate near Kells. W. E. R. Trevithick was Cornish, and served as head gardener from 1912 to 1929 and established Headfort's arboretum. The younger William Edward Trevithick was a gardener at Headfort House from the age of 13, followed by employment at Belvoir Castle owned by the Duke of Rutland. From early 1918, he was recorded as a "pupil gardener" at the National Botanic Gardens, Glasnevin. From 1920, he worked at Kew, where he worked in the herbarium. He eventually left his position at Kew to study art at Chelsea School of Art.

Trevithick produced illustrations for Flora of West Tropical Africa by John Hutchinson and John McEwen Dalziel, Flora Malesiana, and Curtis's Botanical Magazine. He was also a keen photographer, with some of his photographs published in Irish Gardening in 1920.

He then went on to work as a commercial artist with his brother, who was also a commercial artist. He started his own advertising company in the 1930s in Barnes, Surrey. His artwork was for Rolls-Royce and C.C. Wakefield and Co Ltd., the latter producing Castrol motor oil. His work featured on the covers of Flight International Magazine and Airplane. Being an enthusiastic aviator, he qualified as a pilot and became a member of the Royal Aero Club.

He died in Ruislip, Middlesex in 1958.
