= Mary Manning (artist) =

Irish painter and art teacher (1853–1930

- Born: Mary Ruth Manning; 1853; Dublin, Ireland
- Died: 27 January 1930 (aged 76–77); Dublin, Ireland
- Education: Académie Julian
- Occupations: Painter; art teacher
- Father: Robert Manning
- Relatives: Geraldine Manning

Mary Ruth "May" Manning (1853 – 27 January 1930) was an Irish landscape and figure painter and art teacher active in Dublin. Manning's students included Mary Swanzy and Mainie Jellett.

== Early life and education ==
Manning was born on 17 July 1853 in Dublin to Robert Manning, surveyor and civil engineer, and Susanna Manning (née Gibson; died 1894). One of eight siblings, Manning was the sister of Geraldine Manning, a suffragette.

From 1878 to 1879, Manning studied in Paris at the Académie Julian alongside Louise Catherine Breslau and Sarah Purser.

== Artistic work and influence ==
Manning worked primarily in oil and watercolour. In 1880, Manning moved to the family home in Ely Place, Dublin. From 1880 to 1892, her work was exhibited by the Royal Birmingham Society of Artists, the Walker Art Gallery, the Royal Hibernian Academy (RHA), and in Brussels. Manning is best known for her influence on a number of Irish women artists of the time. She and sisters held art lessons from a studio for young women who could to enter the RHA, many of whom she encouraged to study in Paris. Amongst the artists she taught and influenced are Mary Swanzy and Mainie Jellett. Her teaching took up most of her time, which led to her exhibiting her own work infrequently. Manning became a member of the Dublin Sketching Club in 1885. During 1889 to 1892, Manning lived in Hampstead, London.

An oil painting of a landscape and setting sun by Manning is on display in the National Gallery of Ireland, whilst her Study of a boy is in the collections of the Hugh Lane Gallery.

== Personal life ==
Neither Manning or her four sisters married, and lived together with their parents at the family home in Ely Place. In 1905, Manning and at least two of her four sisters moved to Winton Road, Dublin.

On 27 January 1930, Manning died at her home on Winton Road.
