= William Taylor Whan =

Irish-born Australian Presbyterian minister and botanist

William Taylor Whan (30 October 1829 – 2 April 1901) was an Irish-born Australian Presbyterian minister and botanist. He was born in the village of Ballinderry Bridge in County Londonderry, Ireland.

While attending Queen's College, Belfast, Whan was awarded both the University Gold Medal and a senior scholarship in natural history. He graduated with a Master of Arts qualification and became a Fellow of the Royal Microscopical Society.

Whan emigrated to Australia in 1860, becoming a minister in Skipton, Victoria a position he retained until 1884. He was a member of the Field Naturalists Club of Victoria and collected for Ferdinand von Mueller. When he later moved to Port Fairy, he gathered a large collection of algae and shells. He also formed collections of phanerogams, as well as contributing to the Melbourne Herbarium.

Whan died in 1901 and was buried at Skipton. He was commemorated by the name Acacia whanii which was bestowed by Mueller in 1864. This species is currently known as Acacia lanigera var. whanii.
