= Mildred Anne Butler =

Irish artist (1858–1941)

- Born: Mildred Anne Butler; 11 January 1858; Thomastown, County Kilkenny, Ireland
- Died: 11 October 1941; Thomastown, County Kilkenny, Ireland
- Education: Paul Jacob Naftel; William Frank Calderon; Norman Garstin
- Known for: Painting, Watercolours and oils
- Notable work: A Sheltered Corner (1891) R.A.; A High Court of Justice (1892) R.A.; Green-Eyed Jealousy (1894) R.A.; The Morning Bath (1896) R.A.; Beside the Pond (1896) R.W.S. Election 1896; Dull December (1896) R.W.S. Election 1896; Loiterers (1896) R.W.S. Election 1896; Raiders from the Rookery (1896) R.A.; Sunshine Holiday (1898) R.W.S.; Cead Mile Failte (1898) R.A.
- Movement: Newlyn School
- Patrons: Queen Mary of Teck, Grand Duke of Hesse

Mildred Anne Butler RA RWS (11 January 1858 – 11 October 1941) was an Irish artist, who worked in watercolour and oil of landscape, genre and animal subjects. Butler was born and spent most of her life in Kilmurry, Thomastown, County Kilkenny and was associated with the Newlyn School of painters.

Mildred Anne's en plein air style is dominated by the theme of nature and reflects scenes of domesticity around the family home in Kilmurry. She achieved distinction in her lifetime and exhibited in major galleries in Ireland and England. Among her patrons were Queen Mary of Teck and Louis IV, Grand Duke of Hesse.

She became a member of the Royal Academy in 1893. In 1896, Butler's Morning Bath was exhibited at the Royal Academy.^{[a]} It was the second work by a female artist to be purchased by the trustees of the Chantrey Bequest and was then presented to the Tate.^{[b]} She became an associate member of the Royal Watercolour Society in 1896 and was granted full membership in 1937.

She was one of the first academicians elected by the Ulster Academy of Arts in 1930. She virtually stopped painting by the 1930s due to arthritis and died in 1941, aged 83. Around four hundred pieces of her work were sold as part of the artist's studio sale in 1980. She is celebrated in a postage stamp by An Post.

== Life ==
Mildred Anne was born in 1858 in Kilmurry, a Georgian House near Thomastown and was the youngest daughter of Captain Henry Butler, a grandson of the Edmund Butler, 11th Viscount Mountgarret. Knowledge of Butler's life and working methods are almost entirely on the watercolours themselves and on her diaries, which are preserved for most years between 1892 and 1938. Butler's quirky titles such as Ancient Rubbish, A Tit-Bit and Chucked; Green Eyed Jealousy: Ravens amongst trees show the artist's playful sensibility. Her father, Henry Butler, was an amateur artist favouring subjects from nature he encountered on journeys abroad, in particular exotic plants and animals. Butler spent most of her life in the family home at Kilmurry with frequent trips to England and the continent. She continued painting until the 1930s when she stopped painting due to arthritis and died in 1941, aged 83.

== Career ==
Butler's father Henry may have encouraged her to paint in her youth but her artistic training began in London in the late 1880s with the watercolourist Paul Jacob Naftel, whom she credited for her understanding of watercolours. Butler like her friend Rose Barton, who also studied under Naftel, did not follow his choice of landscape, instead she devoted herself to cattle, birds, and flower gardens. She continued her studies at Westminster School of Art under William Frank Calderon who specialised in animal painting and later opened a school of animal painting. At Frank Calderon's School she studied the subject of cows, and it was that work for which she was elected to the Old Society, the Royal Academy.

In her late twentieths, Butler made annual visits to the continent until the outbreak of war. She travelled to France, Belgium, Switzerland and Italy. In Paris, she studied drawing, figure drawing and fine art painting. While in Paris she became associated with the Newlyn school and went on to spend the summers of 1894 and 1895 in Newlyn in Cornwall. Newlyn at that time was the centre for a group of artists who were interested in plein-air subjects, many of whom had previously studied in France. She was attached to the Newlyn School, and Norman Garstin's studio in particular alongside contemporaries such as Walter Osborne and Sir John Lavery. Garstin like Osborne had been a pupil of the Antwerp master Charles Verlat. Butler established a friendship with Luke Fildes, Stanhope Forbes whom she met at Newlyn. The influence of the Limerick-born Garstin, and Forbes, and the contact with the Newlyn School informed Butler's development and remained an important influence on her work throughout her life.

Butler continuously exhibited throughout her career and proved herself to be a keen business woman capable of marketing her watercolours successfully with patrons such as Queen Mary of Teck and Louis IV, Grand Duke of Hesse. She was a member of the Society of Lady Artists. She was one of the first nine academicians elected by the Ulster Academy of Arts in 1930. She was granted full membership into the Royal Watercolour Society in 1937, having been an associate member since 1896.

=== Style ===
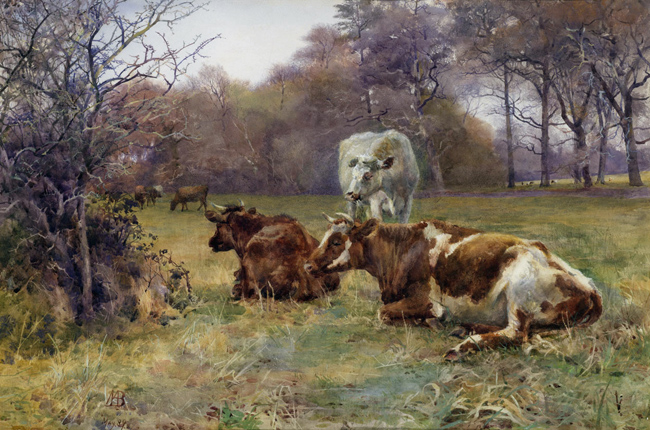
Meditation (1889)

Butler was a painter in oil and watercolour of landscape, genre and animal subjects. Her range of work was dominated by the theme of nature and her subject matter reflected the scenes of domesticity surrounding her Kilmurry home. Butler's house was a huge source of inspiration throughout her life, its garden and surroundings, provided passion for many of her paintings which often included the surrounding gardens, pasture and countryside. These themes interested her particularly remained a constant subject. She also did genre views of villages and towns on the continent.

Butler painted en plein air with instils her work with animated freshness, which she depicts with a degree of realism and expression. Paintings such as Meditation (1889) were considered revolutionary by the art establishment and by critics of the day. The critic of the magazine Hearth and Home described her habit of painting in the open air, rare at the time, and said it give an actuality and a freshness to the painting.

=== Works and exhibitions ===
Butler's principal works have been A Sheltered Corner (1891) R.A., A High Court of Justice (1892) R.A., Green-Eyed Jealousy (1894) R.A., The Morning Bath (1896) R.A., Raiders from the Rookery (1896) R.A., Cead Mile Failte (1898) R.A. Works that she was elected to the R.W.S. in 1896 include Dull December, Loiterers and Beside the Pond. Sunshine Holiday (1898) R.W.S. was another notable work. Her works appears in a number of collections including Morning Bath in the Tate and paintings in the National Gallery of Ireland, the Ulster Museum in Belfast and the Hugh Lane Gallery in Dublin. A small watercolour of crows hangs in Queen Mary's Dolls' House at Windsor. Throughout her career Butler's works were showcased as far abroad as the United States and Japan.

She first exhibited at the Dudley Gallery in Piccadilly. She exhibited in various galleries and institutions including the Royal Hibernian Academy, the Watercolour Society of Ireland, the Belfast Ramblers' Sketching Club, the Royal Academy (1889–1902) and the Royal Watercolour Society. In 1906 she exhibited at the Watercolour Society of Ireland, in Dublin, with works such as The Garden Cart and later that winter in London, at the Old Water-Colour Society where the exhibition included pieces such as Where the Grass Grows Green. In Spring 1919 an exhibition at the Royal Watercolour Society, London, included Tramore Strand, Low water (1889) The Delegates (1923) was exhibited at the New Irish Salon.

In 1980, watercolours, drawings and sketches, together with notes, letters and diaries were sold as part of the artist's studio sale. Some were sold in Ireland and others at a studio sale at Christie's in London. The National Gallery of Ireland purchased seven fine watercolours for its permanent collection. Fota House in Cork contains one of her works. An Exhibition of Butler's work was held by the Kilkenny Art Gallery Society at Kilkenny Castle in June 1981 which included pieces such as Where the Grass Grows Green (1904) It was further exhibited at the Bank of Ireland, Baggot Street, Dublin in August 1981 and at Christies, King Street, London in September 1981. In 1987 Kilkenny Art Gallery, Kilkenny, presented an exhibition Mildred Anne Butler, which included Cats Chasing Birds (1918). Between August–September 1987 the Crawford Municipal Art Gallery, Cork, presented an exhibition Mildred Anne Butler 1858-1941. An Irish Edwardian Watercolour Collection which included Figures beside a horse and chaise (1896) In April to June 1988 Ulster Museum and Art Gallery, Belfast, presented an exhibition Mildred Anne Butler which included Cats Chasing Birds (1918). She is celebrated on a Postage stamp in an An Post collection for female Irish artists.

== Selected works ==
- A Sheltered Corner (1891) R.A.
- A High Court of Justice (1892) R.A.
- Green-Eyed Jealousy (1894) R.A.
- The Morning Bath (1896) R.A., Tate, London.
- Beside the Pond (1896) R.W.S. Election 1896
- Dull December (1896) R.W.S. Election 1896
- Loiterers (1896) R.W.S. Election 1896
- Raiders from the Rookery (1896) R.A.
- Sunshine Holiday (1898) R.W.S.
- Cead Mile Failte (1898) R.A.
- Toll from the Turnip Cart (1896)
- The Wanderers (1898), Hugh Lane Gallery, Dublin.
- The Garden Cart
- Doves outside the Conservatory, Kilmurry
- Tramore Strand, Low water 1889
- Where the Grass Grows Green
- The Delegates (1923)
- Dandelions and Scillas
- The Garden Path (1922)
- Procession through the bluebells
- Madonna Lilies
- Side-cars
- Foxgloves
- Poppies (1904)
- The Lily Pond (1897)
- In the Conservatory, Kilmurry
- View in Pembroke Street, Dublin
- A garden path, probably Kilmurry
- A summer's day
- Hollyhocks
- Winter Survival
- Low water, Tramore, Waterford (1919)
- Station cabbies (1898)
- Poppies at Kilmurry: View across a wild Garden; and In flower
- Autumn by the Lake (1890)
- Figures beside a horse and chaise
- Horses grazing (1998)
- Cats Chasing Birds (1918)
- Peacocks
- The Spring Garden, Kilmurry
- Study of a Delphinium
- Sheep in a meadow
- The Grinding Wheel, Kilmurry
- Cattle grazing, Kilmurry
- Edge of the Woods
- Cattle in the shade, Kilmurray (1917)
- Lismore, Waterford
- Two cats, Kilmurry
- The Kilmurry Estate
- Meditation (1889)
- Cattle Resting in a Summer Meadow (1899)
- A Dead Magpie in a Tree
- A Trout Stream
- Procession through the Bluebells
- Crucifixion and hollyhocks
- Lilac Phlox
- The Farmyard

Other

- An Post Postage stamp

Other Works

- "Chucked; Green Eyed Jealousy": Ravens amongst trees'
- Spring Garden (1916)
- The Sentinels: Rooks in the snow (1895)
- A Nap, Kilmurry, Co Kilkenny
- The Flowers of August (1900)
- Peacocks and Peahens on a Sunlit Lawn
- At Lismore, Co Waterford (1913)
- Fine Feathers
- Threashing in a riverside Field (1910)
- Peacocks at Kilmurry (1910)
- Doves at the Edge of a Garden
- A Cat stalking Pigeons
- Rose Peany
- Crows resting in a snow covered Landscape
- A Summer Border (1914)
- Young Jackdaws
- Aix les Bains
- A bluebell wood
- Kilmurry
- A French Chateau (1901)
- Cattle grazing
- Trees by a meadow

== See also ==
- Newlyn School
- List of Irish artists
- List of Irish botanical illustrators

== Notes ==
a. The Royal Academy in London refused to show artists who painted in the French style, young painters had to form their own society in order to exhibit. This attitude waned throughout the 1890s.

b. The Morning Bath (1896) was amongst the few watercolours that were purchased by the Trustees of the Chantrey Bequest and was the second work by a female artist to be purchased (the first was Anna Lea Merritt's 'Love Locked Out' in 1890) and was presented to the Tate.
