= Grace Henry =

Scottish artist (1868–1953)

- Born: 10 February 1868; Kirktown St. Fergus, Aberdeenshire, Scotland
- Died: 11 August 1953 (aged 85); Dublin, Ireland
- Resting place: Mount Jerome Cemetery
- Spouse: Paul Henry

Grace Henry HRHA (10 February 1868 – 11 August 1953) was a Scottish landscape artist, who spent a large part of her career painting in Ireland.

== Early life and education ==
Grace Henry was born Emily Grace Mitchell at Kirktown St. Fergus, near Peterhead, Aberdeenshire on 10 February 1868. She was the ninth child of ten of the Rev. John Mitchell and Jane Mitchell (née Gardner). Lord Byron was a cousin of her maternal grandmother. Henry was educated at home, spending time at the family's home in Piccadilly, where she experience London society. After the death of her father, and the reduced circumstances she found herself in, Henry left home in 1895 to pursue a career as an artist. The first record of her work being exhibited is with the Aberdeen Artists Society in 1896 and 1898. These paintings have not been traced since. In 1899 she left Scotland for the continent, visiting Holland and Belgium, studying at the Blanc‐Guerrins academy in Brussels. She went on to attend the Delacluze academy in Paris. Whilst in Paris, she met Paul Henry, an Irish artist, with the couple marrying in September 1903 in London.

== Artistic career ==
The Henrys lived at a few different residences outside London until 1910. A small number of Henry's works are known from this time, such as The girl in white, which is in the collections of the Hugh Lane Gallery. This piece shows the influence of fellow artist James Abbott McNeill Whistler, whom she met in Paris through her husband. The couple travelled in Achill Island for the first time in 1910 which was intended to be a two-week stay, with the couple going on to live there until 1919. During this time, Henry painted numerous night scenes, including Achill cottages (Hugh Lane Gallery). A well known work by Henry is Top of the hill on display in the Limerick City Gallery of Art, which shows a group of island women. This period spent on the island did place a strain on the Henrys marriage, as Grace was not as happy living there.

The couple returned to Dublin in 1919, and were founding members of the Society of Dublin Painters in 1920 alongside Letitia Marion Hamilton, Mary Swanzy, and Jack Butler Yeats. The Society offered an outlet for younger Irish artists to exhibit. Five of Henrys works were featured at the Irish Exhibition in Paris in 1922, and at a similar exhibition in Brussels in 1930.

Around 1920, Grace had a romantic association with Stephen Gwynn who was an important political, cultural and literary figure from the lost world of late-nineteenth and early-twentieth century Ireland. During this period Grace went travelling with Gwynn in France and Italy and later painted a number of portraits of Gwynn. Invariably, during this time, the Henrys' marriage continued to have problems, with the couple breaking up in 1924. Grace's affair with Gwynn, who she depicted in two known oil paintings including 'The orange man' (Limerick City Gallery of Art) and 'Portrait of a man' which depicted a much more distinguished Gwynn in later life, contributed to the break up. The couple legally separated in 1930.

Henry developed her own style through the 1920s and 1930s, spending time in France and Italy. She studied with André Lhote from 1924 to 1925, Lhote was a cubist painter who also worked with Mainie Jellett, Evie Hone, and Mary Swanzy. Henry went on to display little of his influence in her work. Henry painted in Venice and in the environs of the Italian lakes, painting with the fauvist style, with free brushwork and vibrant colours. Henry also experimented with expressionism, which can be seen in Spring in winter. Upon the outbreak of World War II, she returned to Ireland. Henry did not have a permanent residence during this period, instead she stayed with friends or lived in hotels. She also experienced periods of melancholy during these later years, though she continued to exhibit. Her work was regularly displayed at the Royal Hibernian Academy (RHA), and she had solo shows at the Waddington and Dawson galleries. Henry was made an honorary member of the RHA in 1949.

== Legacy ==
Henry died in Dublin on 11 August 1953, and is buried at Mount Jerome Cemetery. During her career, and for a number of years after her death, Henry was largely overshadowed by her husband sometimes referred to as "Mrs Paul Henry". She was even omitted from Paul Henry's two-volume autobiography. Her body of work was re-examined in the 1970s, which led to wider public recognition and her inclusion in a number of exhibitions such as The paintings of Paul and Grace Henry at the Hugh Lane Gallery in 1991. She is deemed to be a much bolder painter than her husband, incorporating more elements of the modernist movement, as evident in The long grey road of Disting (1915). Her popularity has been growing since her rediscovery.
