= Society of Dublin Painters =

Cl Kolo

- Formation: 1920
- Founder: Paul Henry, Grace Henry, Mary Swanzy, Letitia Marion Hamilton, Jack B. Yeats, Harry Clarke
- Dissolved: early 1960s
- Type: Artistic society
- Purpose: Promotion of Irish modern art
- Location: 7 St Stephen's Green, Dublin, Ireland
- Region served: Ireland
- Members: 10 (initial), 18 (by 1934)
- Affiliations: Irish Exhibition of Living Art, Royal Hibernian Academy (independent)

The Society of Dublin Painters or Dublin Painters Group was formed in Ireland in 1920 to promote Irish modern art.

== History ==
The Society of Dublin Painters was founded in 1920 by Paul and Grace Henry, Mary Swanzy, Letitia Marion Hamilton, Jack B. Yeats, and Harry Clarke. As the original meeting notes have been lost, there is some uncertainty as to which artists were there at the inaugural meeting. Along with these potential founding members, Clare Marsh, E.M. O’Rourke Dickey, and James Sleator were featured in the first exhibition. The Society held its first exhibition at its premises at 7 St Stephen's Green on 5 August 1920, which ran until 1 September and attracted good reviews. Yeats, Marsh, and Paul Henry were all signatories to the lease of this premises. The group sought to bring modernism to Ireland, and provide a freer, less academic space for artistic expression and experimentation less focused on accuracy and realism. Its foundation was seen as providing an alternative public exhibition space to the more conservative Royal Hibernian Academy (RHA), which did not favour exhibiting Irish modern art. At its 1923 exhibition, Mainie Jellet exhibited one of her earliest cubist paintings, Decoration. The membership always had a large proportion of women.

The Society held annual exhibitions and one-person shows at its premises on St Stephen's Green. Unlike the RHA, the Society did not mandate a particular style of painting for inclusion in its exhibitions, with the only limitation on the number of paintings an artist could submit. The members were free to submit paintings to other exhibitions such as the RHA, The White Stag Group and Irish Exhibition of Living Art. Membership was limited, with just 10 members initially, rising to 12 in 1932, and 18 in 1934 owing to limited exhibition and studio space. By 1943, the Society was being overtaken by exhibitions like the Irish Exhibition of Living Art and was no longer seen as the premier outlet for avant-garde Irish art. After a decline in membership, the Society ceased to exist by the early 1960s.
