= Mary Swanzy =

Irish painter (1882–1978)

- Swanzy in Dublin, 1908
- Born: 15 February 1882; Dublin, Ireland
- Died: 7 July 1978 (aged 96); London, United Kingdom
- Known for: early Irish abstract painting
- Style: cubism, fauvism, futurism, and orphism
- Father: Sir Henry Rosborough Swanzy

Mary Swanzy HRHA (15 February 1882 – 7 July 1978) was an Irish painter. One of Ireland's first abstract painters, Swanzy was a representative of cubist, futurist, fauvist, and orphist art movements.

== Early life and education ==
Swanzy was born on 15 February 1882 in Dublin to Mary Knox Swanzy (née Denham) and Sir Henry Rosborough Swanzy, an ophthalmologist and vice-president of the Royal College of Surgeons in Ireland. Swanzy grew up at 23 Merrion Square as one of five siblings, two of which died in infancy.

Swanzy attended Alexandra College, Earlsfort Terrace, a finishing school at the Lycée in Versailles, France, and a day school in Freiburg, Germany. This education meant that Swanzy was fluent in French and German. She went on to take art classes at Mary Manning's studio, under the direction of John Butler Yeats. Manning encouraged Swanzy to study modelling with John Hughes at the Dublin Metropolitan School of Art. Living within walking distance of the National Gallery of Ireland, she spent a lot of time studying and copying the great masters. Swanzy's first exhibition was with the Royal Hibernian Academy (RHA) in 1905 with Portrait of a child, continuing to exhibit portraits every year until 1910. In 1905 she went to Paris, and worked at the Delacluse studio. She went on to attend the studio of Antonio de La Gándara in 1906, and took classes at Académie de la Grande Chaumière and Académie Colarossi. Whilst in Paris Swanzy was exposed to the works of Gauguin, Matisse, and Picasso, which made a lasting impression on her.

== Artistic career ==
On her return to Dublin, Swanzy painted portraits and genre scenes and held her first show at Mill's Hall, Merrion Row in 1913. She held another show there in 1919, where she exhibited nearly 50 pieces. This exhibition was reviewed by Sarah Purser who noted the lack of melancholy and light optimism in Swanzy's Irish landscapes. Swanzy painted in a number of styles, often reflecting the major art developments in Paris. After the deaths of her parents, Swanzy was financially independent and could travel, spending her time between Dublin and Saint-Tropez during World War I whilst continuing to paint. She also exhibited with the Société des Artistes Indépendants in 1914 and 1916, being elected to the committee in 1920. Whilst visiting her sister who was involved with the Protestant relief mission in Yugoslavia and Czechoslovakia, Swanzy painted landscapes, village life, and peasant scenes. These works were shown in the autumn of 1921 in the Dublin Painters' Gallery with six other artists including Jack Butler Yeats, Paul Henry, and Clare Marsh with whom Swanzy shared a studio.

Swanzy began to travel to more exotic countries from the 1920s, Honolulu around 1923, and later Samoa. As a result, she painted local tropical flowers, trees, and native women, with a palette and style similar to that of Fauvism. She stayed for a time in Santa Barbara, California, working in a local studio and exhibiting some of her Samoan work at the Santa Barbara Arts Club Gallery. She returned to Ireland in February 1925 and exhibited three of her Samoan paints at the RHA, and 14 at her one-woman show in the Galerie Bernheim Jeune, Paris in October 1925. Gertrude Stein wrote to Swanzy to congratulate her on her Paris exhibition.

In the mid-1920s Swanzy settled in Blackheath, London, making regular trips to Dublin and abroad. In 1932 Purser held an exhibition of Swanzy's work for invited guests in her house. Purser's drawing room was the subject of one of Swanzy's work. At this time Swanzy's painting was influenced by orphism and was reviewed positively. Her work became more allegorical in later years, with The message in the Hugh Lane Gallery demonstrating this. During World War II Swanzy stayed with her sister in Coolock for three years. In 1943, she held a one-woman show at the Dublin Painters' Gallery, and she was also featured at the first Irish Exhibition of Living Art. She was exhibited at St George's Gallery, London in 1946 along with Henry Moore, Marc Chagall, and William Scott.

== Later life ==
Swanzy was made an honorary member of the RHA in 1949, showing with them in 1950 and 1951. She did not exhibit in Ireland for a number of years, but the Hugh Lane Gallery held a major retrospective of her work in 1968. Following this she held two one woman shows at the Dawson Gallery in 1974 and 1976. In 1975 she was featured at the Cork ROSC and resumed showing with the RHA. She continued to paint until her death at her home in London on 7 July 1978. In 1982 the Taylor Galleries held her exhibition to mark the centenary of her birth. More recently Swanzy was featured in the Irish Museum of Modern Art 2013 exhibition Analysing Cubism. From October 2018-February 2019, also in IMMA, she was the subject of the solo exhibition Mary Swanzy Voyages.
