= Mainie Jellett =

Irish artist (1897–1944)

- Born: Mary Harriet Jellett; 29 April 1897; Dublin, Ireland
- Died: 16 February 1944 (aged 46); Dublin, Ireland
- Resting place: St Fintan's Cemetery, Howth
- Education: Metropolitan School of Art
- Alma mater: Westminster Technical Institute
- Occupations: Artist, painter

Mary Harriet Jellett (29 April 1897 – 16 February 1944) was an Irish painter whose Decoration (1923) was among the first abstract paintings shown in Ireland when it was exhibited at the Society of Dublin Painters Group Show in 1923. She was a strong promoter and defender of modern art in her country, and her artworks are present in museums in Ireland. Her work was also part of the painting event in the art competition at the 1928 Summer Olympics.

== Early life ==
Jellett was born on 29 April 1897 at 36 Fitzwilliam Square, Dublin, one of the four daughters of William Jellett, a barrister and later MP, and Janet McKenzie Stokes. Mainie's mother was an accomplished musician, and all her daughters received a musical education. Mainie's sister Dorothea (Bay) was the orchestra conductor at the Gaiety Theatre, Dublin. Her aunt was Eva Jellett, a pioneering doctor working in India. William and Eva Jellett were among the seven children of John Hewitt Jellett, Provost of Trinity College Dublin.

Jellett's art education began at the age of 11, when she received painting lessons from Elizabeth Yeats, Sarah Cecilia Harrison, and Mary Manning, who had a studio on Merrion Row, and whose influence on Irish artists of the time was considerable.

In 1914, she studied at the Metropolitan School of Art in Dublin. Her teachers included William Orpen, and his influence is apparent in her work from this period. Despite her artistic talent, she was still undecided about her future, and at this time took regular piano lessons with the intent of becoming a concert pianist.

She decided to become a painter after working under Walter Sickert at the Westminster Technical Institute in London, where she enrolled in 1917 and remained until 1919. She showed precocious talent as an artist in the impressionist style. In 1920, she won the Taylor Art Scholarship worth £50. The same year, she submitted work to the annual exhibition of the Royal Hibernian Academy.

== Career ==
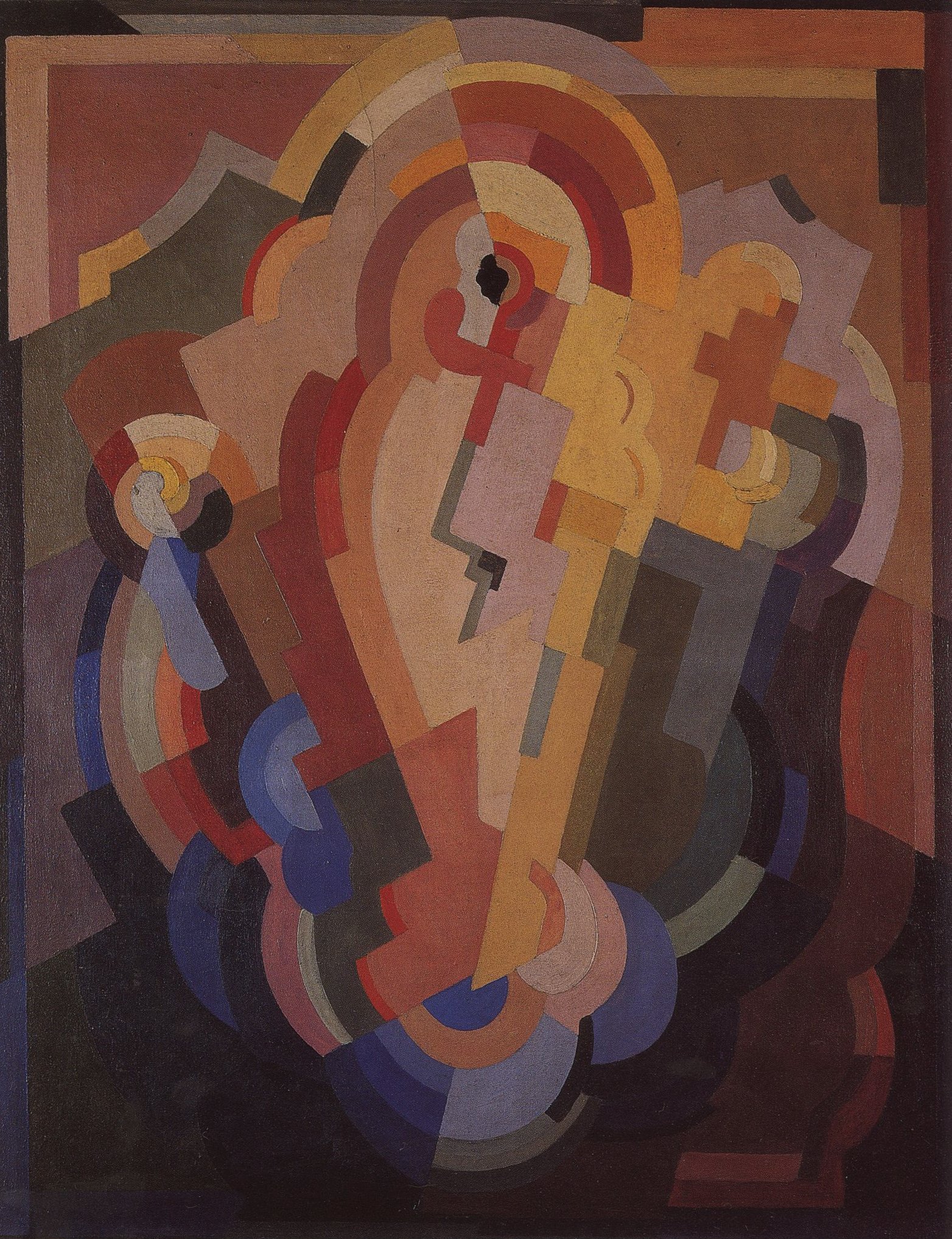
Mainie Jellett, Abstract Composition, 1935, oil on canvas, 119.5 x 96.9 cm

In 1921, along with her companion Evie Hone, she moved to Paris. There she worked under André Lhote and Albert Gleizes, encountering cubism and beginning an exploration of abstract art. Her new style, including colour and rhythm, was greatly inspired by her stay in France. After 1921, she and Evie Hone returned to Dublin, but for the next decade, they spent part of each year in Paris. In a 1943 essay entitled 'Definition of my Art' Jellett describes her art as having three revolutions inspired by her teachers; the first credited to Walter Sickert, the second to André Lhote, and the third to Albert Gleizes.

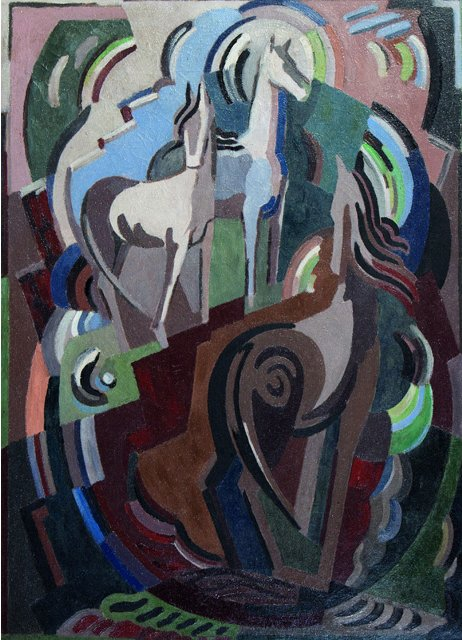
Achill Horses by Mainie Jellett, 1938

In 1923, she exhibited two cubist paintings at the Dublin Painters' Exhibition. The response was hostile, with the Irish Times publishing a photograph of one of the paintings and quoting their art critic as saying of them, 'to me they presented an insoluble puzzle'. The following year, she and Evie Hone had their first joint exhibition.

A deeply committed Christian, her paintings, though never strictly representational and sometimes completely non-objective, occasionally have religious titles and may, in some respects, resemble icons in tone and even, on occasion, in the palette. In Irish Art, a Concise History, Bruce Arnold writes: "Many of her abstracts are built up from a central 'eye' or 'heart' in arcs of colour, held up and together by the rhythm of line and shape, and given depth and intensity - a sense of abstract perspective - by the basic understanding of light and colour"

Jellett was an important figure in Irish art history, both as an early proponent of abstract art and as a champion of the modernist movement. Her painting was often attacked critically but she proved eloquent in defence of her ideas. Along with Evie Hone, Louis le Brocquy, Jack Hanlon, and Norah McGuinness, Jellett co-founded the Irish Exhibition of Living Art in 1944. In her published work "An Approach To Painting" (1942) Jellett stated why she felt artists were necessary for society:

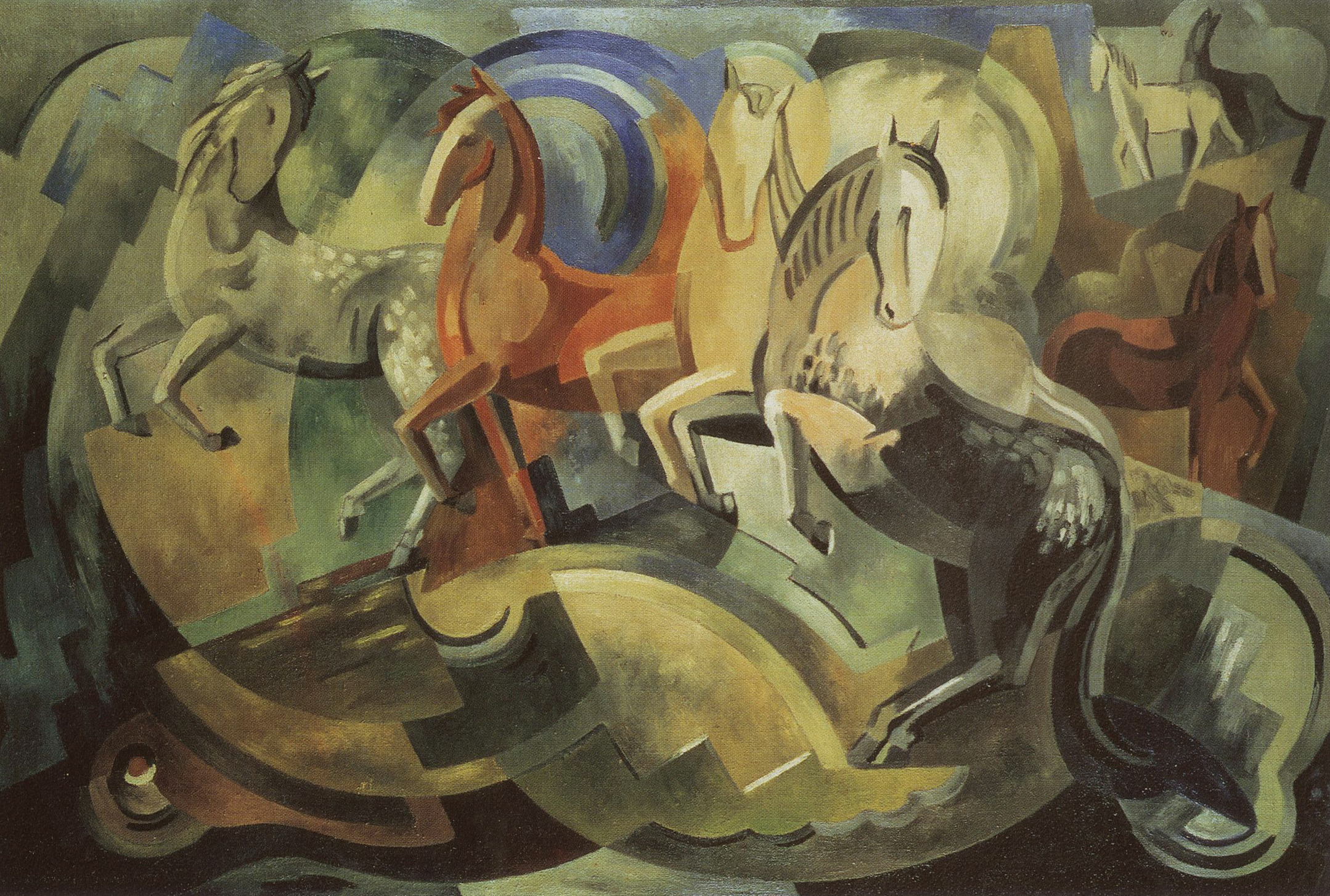
Achill Horses, oil on canvas, 61 x 92 cm, 1939, National Gallery of Ireland

"The idea of an artist being a special person, an exotic flower set apart from other people is one of the errors resulting from the industrial revolution, and the fact of artists being pushed out of their lawful position in the life and society of the present day. … Their present enforced isolation from the majority is a very serious situation and I believe it is one of the many causes which has resulted in the present chaos we live in. The art of a nation is one of the ultimate facts by which its spiritual health is judged and appraised by posterity."

== Death and legacy ==
Jellett died in Dublin on 16 February 1944, aged 46, of pancreatic cancer. Elizabeth Bowen wrote a heartfelt obituary published in the periodical The Bell in 1944. She mentions one of their last talks in which Jellett mentioned the work of a genius, Dorothy Richardson – until the end, showing solidarity with women and the feminist movement.

A plaque commemorates her former residence and place of work on 24 Upper Pembroke Street, Dublin.

Her work was an important part of the Active Age project in the Irish Museum of Modern Art (IMMA), which was produced to rewrite the narrative of art and change the canon. Jellett's work was not very well known outside of Ireland, but she was a pioneer of a national avant-garde and strongly supported the encouragement of young Irish artists. The IMMA decided to evaluate and reexamine the European canon and bring artists like Mainie Jellett to the front line.

In 1990 Bruce Arnold produced, scripted, and narrated a documentary To Make it Live-Mainie Jellett. In 1991 Arnold published a comprehensive biography of Jellett together with an analysis of the modern movement in Ireland.

== Work in collections ==
- Crawford Art Gallery, Cork, including:
  - Composition (c. 1935)
- Niland Art Collection, Sligo
- Butler Gallery Collection, Kilkenny
- Trinity College, Dublin
- The Hugh Lane Municipal Gallery, Dublin
- The Irish Museum of Modern Art, Dublin
- Four Element Composition (1930)
- The National Gallery of Ireland, Dublin
- Greyfriars Municipal Art Gallery, Waterford Municipal Art Collection, Waterford
- Ulster Museum, Belfast, UK

== Sources ==
- Claire Dalton (2014) "Irish Women Artists 1870 - 1970" Adams Summer Loan Exhibition 2014
- Daire O'Connell (2002), "Jellet, Mary Harriet (Mainie)", in Brian Lalor (ed.), The Encyclopedia of Ireland. Dublin: Gill & Macmillan. ISBN 0-7171-3000-2
- Bruce Arnold (1977), Irish Art, a Concise History (2nd ed.), London: Thames and Hudson, ISBN 0-500-20148-X
- Crookshank, Anne; White, James; Brooke, Peter (1991). Mainie Jellett 1897-1944. Irish Museum of Modern Art. ISBN 1-873654-01-4.
- Barrett, Cyril (1993). "Mainie Jellett and Irish Modernism". Irish Arts Review Yearbook. 9: 167–173. JSTOR 20492730.
- Bhreathnach-Lynch, Sighle (2002). "Twelve Irish Artists: A School of Irish Painting?". New Hibernia Review. 6 (2): 130–134. doi:10.1353/nhr.2002.0025. S2CID 145361759.
- Carson, Niall (2016). Rebel by vocation: Seán O'Faoláin and the generation of The Bell. Manchester University Press. ISBN 978-1-78499-711-3. Project MUSE book 51370.
- Cullinan, Monica (1995). "Irish Women". Journal of Women's History. 7: 250–277. doi:10.1353/jowh.2010.0368. S2CID 201764631.
- "Color Insert". Éire-Ireland. 40 (3): 2005. 2005. doi:10.1353/eir.2005.0014.
- Dalton, Claire. Irish Women Artists 1870–1970: Summer Loan Exhibition. Dublin: Adams Auctioneers, 2014.
- Dublin (Ireland). Municipal Gallery of Modern Art. Mainie Jellett, 1897-1944 : a retrospective exhibition of paintings and drawings. 1962-01-01T00:00:00Z. Retrieved from the Digital Public Library of America. Accessed 21 April 2020. http://www.archive.org/details/mainiejellett18900dubl.
- Frost, Stella. A Tribute to Evie Hone and Mainie Jellett. Dublin: Browne and Nolan, 1957.
- Hartigan, Marianne (1987). "The Irish Exhibition of Living Art". Irish Arts Review (1984-1987). 4 (4): 58–59. JSTOR 20492035.
- IMMA. Department of Culture, Heritage and the Gaeltacht. Accessed 22 April 2020. https://imma.ie/collection/?_sft_artwork_artist=mainie-jellett&sf_paged=1&obj=obj_24565.
- Kennedy, S.B. A CelebrAtion of Irish Art And Modernism. Clandeboye: Adams, 2011. https://www.adams.ie/media/exhibition_pdfs/1456762848Modernscataloguesmall.pdf.
- MacCarvill, Eileen, and Albert Gleizes. 1958. The artist's vision, Mainie Jellett: lectures and essays on art. Dundalk: Dundalgan Press.
- "Mainie Jellett". Art UK. Arts Council England. Accessed 22 April 2020. https://www.artuk.org/discover/artists/jellett-mainie-18971944.
- McGonagle, Declan (2017). "For Them, Not Us: "Turning" the Museum in an Anxious World". Éire-Ireland. 52 (3–4): 75–103. doi:10.1353/eir.2017.0023. S2CID 201723359.
- Meaney, Gerardine; O'dowd, Mary; Whelan, Bernadette (2013). "Producers and Consumers of Popular Culture, 1900–60". Reading the Irish Woman. pp. 179–195. doi:10.2307/j.ctt5vjjn3.10. ISBN 9781781388198.
- Pyle, Hilary (2003). "Jellett, Mainie [Mary Harriet]". Grove Art Online. doi:10.1093/gao/9781884446054.article.T044570.
- Shields, Daniel (1957). "Reviewed work: A Tribute to Evie Hone and Mainie Jellett". Studies: An Irish Quarterly Review. 46 (183): 377–378. JSTOR 30098922.
