= Paul Henry (painter) =

Irish artist (1876–1958)

Landscape is representative of Henry's style, balancing realism and modernity in reducing the landscape of western Ireland to its essential elements. Features such as the turf stacks and hills are synchronised in a technique influenced by his study with Whistler.

Paul Henry (11 April 1876 – 24 August 1958) was an Irish artist noted for depicting the West of Ireland landscape in a spare Post-Impressionist style.

== Biography ==
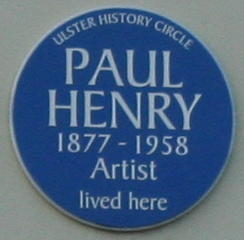
Plaque to Paul Henry, University Road, Belfast, which erroneously gives his year of birth as 1877

Henry was born at 61 University Road, Belfast, Ireland, the son of the Rev Robert Mitchell Henry, a Baptist minister (who later joined the Plymouth Brethren), and Kate Ann Berry.

Henry began studying at Methodist College Belfast in 1882 where he first began drawing regularly. At the age of fifteen he moved to the Royal Belfast Academical Institution. He studied art at the Belfast School of Art before going to Paris in 1898 to study at the Académie Julian and at Whistler's Académie Carmen.

He married the painter Grace Henry in 1903 and returned to Ireland in 1910. From then until 1919 he lived on Achill Island, where he learned to capture the peculiar interplay of light and landscape specific to the West of Ireland. In 1919 he moved to Dublin and in 1920, he was one of the founders of the Society of Dublin Painters, originally a group of ten artists. Henry designed several railway posters, some of which, notably Connemara Landscape, achieved considerable sales. He separated from his wife in 1929. His second wife was the artist Mabel Young.

In the 1920s and 1930s, Henry was Ireland's most renowned artist, significantly shaping the popular image of the west of Ireland. Although he appears to have stopped experimenting with his technique after leaving Achill, and his range is limited, he produced a substantial body of fine images whose familiarity attests to their influence.

Henry's use of colour was affected by his red-green colour blindness. He lost his sight during 1945 and did not regain his vision before his death.

A commemorative exhibition of Henry's work was held at Trinity College, Dublin, in 1973 and the National Gallery of Ireland held a major exhibition of his work in 2004.

Henry’s painting Dooega was featured on an episode of the BBC's Antiques Roadshow, broadcast on 12 November 2006. The painting was given a value of approximately £40,000–60,000 by the roadshow. However, due to the buoyancy of the Irish art market at that time, it sold for £150,000 (260,000 Euro) on 5 December 2006 in James Adams' and Bonhams' joint Important Irish Art sale.

He died at his home at 1 Sidmonton Square, Bray, County Wicklow, and was survived by his wife, Mabel.

A memorial plaque was unveiled in Belfast in 2004.

== Work in collections ==
- Model Arts and Niland Gallery, Sligo
- Crawford Art Gallery, Cork (including Landscape; 1923)
- Musée du Luxembourg
- National Gallery of Ireland, Dublin
- Ulster Museum, Belfast
- Hunt Museum, Limerick

== See also ==
- List of Northern Irish artists
