= Doorin Peninsula =

Peninsula in County Donegal, Ireland

Coordinates: 54.617882°N 8.267405°W

Dúrian
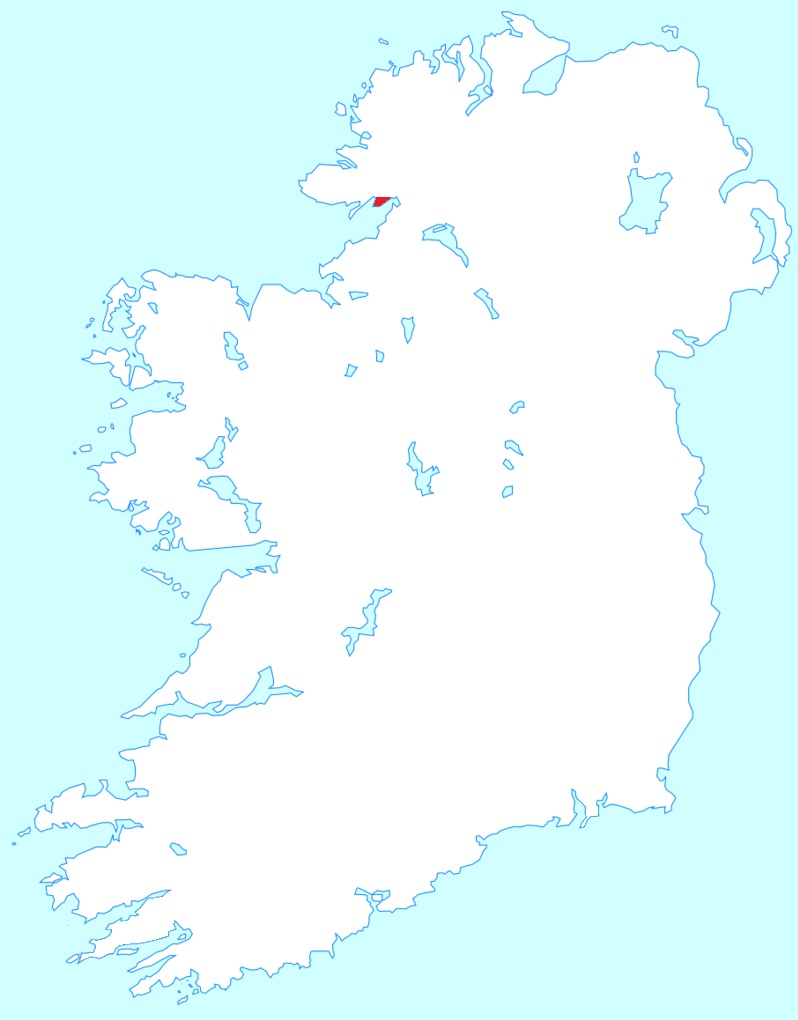
- Location of the Doorin Peninsula
- Interactive map of Doorin Peninsula

Geography
- Location: Ireland
- Adjacent to: Atlantic Ocean
- Area: 20.1 km^{2} (7.8 sq mi)

Administration
- Ireland
- County: Donegal

Demographics
- Population: 495 (2016)
- Pop. density: 24.6/km^{2} (63.7/sq mi)

The Doorin Peninsula (Irish: Dúrian) is a peninsula in County Donegal, Ireland. The peninsula is one of the many rocky outcrops on the northern side of Donegal Bay.

The area is largely agricultural, with small patches of commercial forest. The coastline is most low-lying, however sizable sea-cliffs are present in the south of the peninsula, at Doorin Point, and a small sand beach is located in the west of the peninsula. Extensive wave-cut platforms are exposed along the peninsula at low tide.

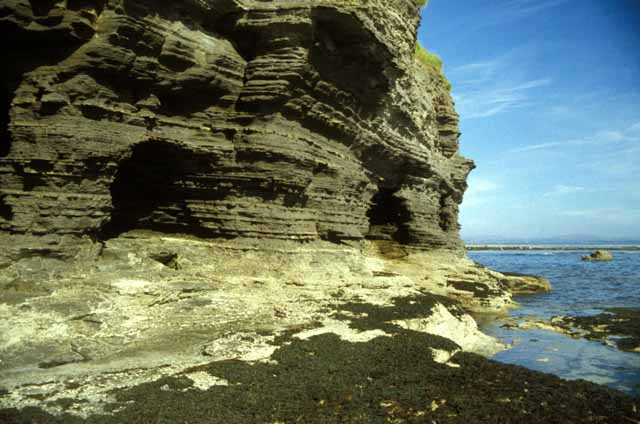
Doorin Point

== See also ==
- Mountcharles
- Inver
