= Banagh =

Banagh Báinigh (Irish)
- Barony
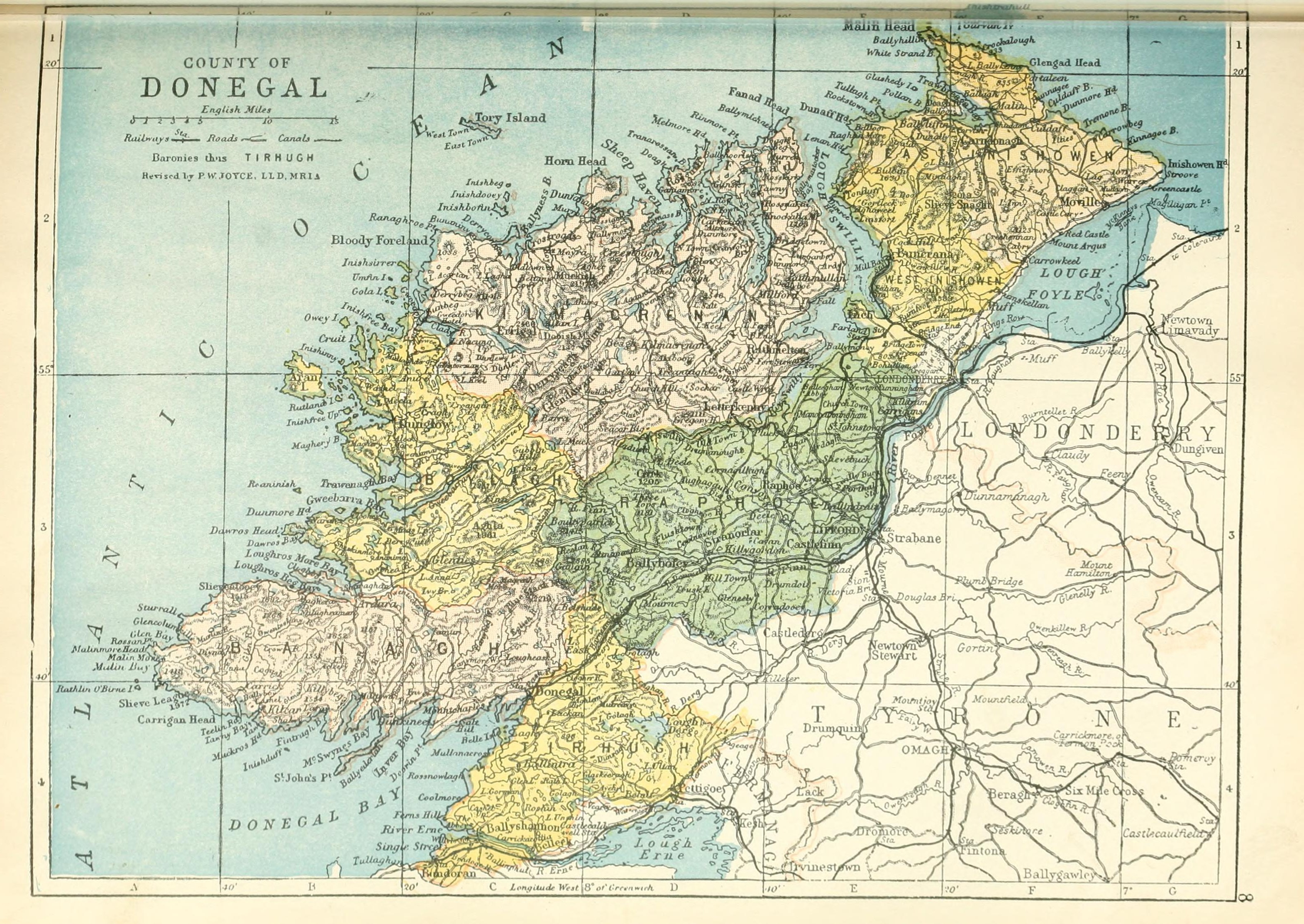
- Barony map of County Donegal, 1900; Banagh is in the southwest, coloured peach.

- Location within Ireland
- Coordinates: 54°42′N 8°18′W
- Sovereign state: Ireland
- Province: Ulster
- County: Donegal

Area
  - Total: 632.30 km^{2} (244.13 sq mi)

Banagh (Irish: Báinigh (Note: Banagh)) is a historic barony in County Donegal in Ireland. Patrick Weston Joyce said the name Banagh came from Enna Bogaine, son of Conall Gulban, son of Niall of the Nine Hostages. It was created along with Boylagh when the former barony of Boylagh and Banagh was split in 1791 by an Act of the Parliament of Ireland.

Banagh is bordered by the baronies of Boylagh to the north, Raphoe South to the northeast, and Tirhugh to the east. Donegal Bay is to the south, and the open Atlantic Ocean to the west.

== Civil parishes ==
The barony contains the following civil parishes:

- Glencolumbkille
- Inishkeel (also partly in barony of Boylagh)
- Inver
- Kilcar
- Killaghtee
- Killybegs Lower (also partly in barony of Boylagh)
- Killybegs Upper
- Killymard
- Rossory, one townland only i.e. Crownasillagh (also partly in baronies of Magheraboy and Clanawley)

== Towns and villages ==
Settlements in the barony include Ardara, (Note: Banagh: towns) Carrick, Donegal, Dunkineely, Frosses, (Note: Banagh: population centres) Glencolumbkille, Inver, Killybegs, Kilcar, Mountcharles, and Teelin. Other features in the barony include Lough Eske, (Note: Banagh: lakes) Slieve League, (Note: Banagh: mountains and mountain ranges) and the Bluestack Mountains.

== Features ==
The barony is thus described in the Parliamentary Gazetteer of 1846:

A large part of it consists of a peninsula 14½ miles in length, and 6½ in mean breadth, very nearly insulated by streams which fall into the head respectively of Killybegs Harbour and Loughrosbeg bay, and extending westward to the seaward face of Slieveleague mountain, and to the plunge into the Atlantic of Tillen Head, the most westerly ground in the mainland of Donegal. Several marine indentations, generally tongue-shaped or elongated, indent the coast, and serrate it with small peninsulae; the principal of which are Loughrosbeg bay on the west, and Tillen harbour, Killybegs harbour, Macswine's bay, and Inver bay, on the south. Nearly the whole of the interior is a series of granitic uplands, alternating with wild moors or dismal bogs. Several of the mountains have an altitude above sea-level of 1,600 feet; and Slieveleague, near the extremity of the great peninsula, has an elevation of 1,964 feet, rises boldly up from the coast of the entrance of Donegal bay, and, as seen from the opposite sea-board of Sligo, forms a very remarkable feature in a boldly outlined landscape. The skirts of Slieveleague, the precipitous stoop of Teelin Head, and a considerable extent of intervening and prolonged cliff-line, suffer furious onsets from the roll and tempests of the Atlantic; present a shaggy, rugged, rocky exterior, deeply riven with the waves; and compose a series of alternately impressive and romantic coast-views. About 30,000 acres of the barony belong to the Marquis of Conyngham; and a tract which belongs to the Trinity College Dublin is said to have been so leased as to yield an annual rental profit of £9,000 to the lessee. This barony contains part of the parishes of Inniskeel and Lower Killybegs, and the whole of the parishes of Glencolumbkill, Inver, Kilcarr, Killaghtee, Upper Killybegs, and Killymard.
