= Berrell Jensen =

South African sculptor

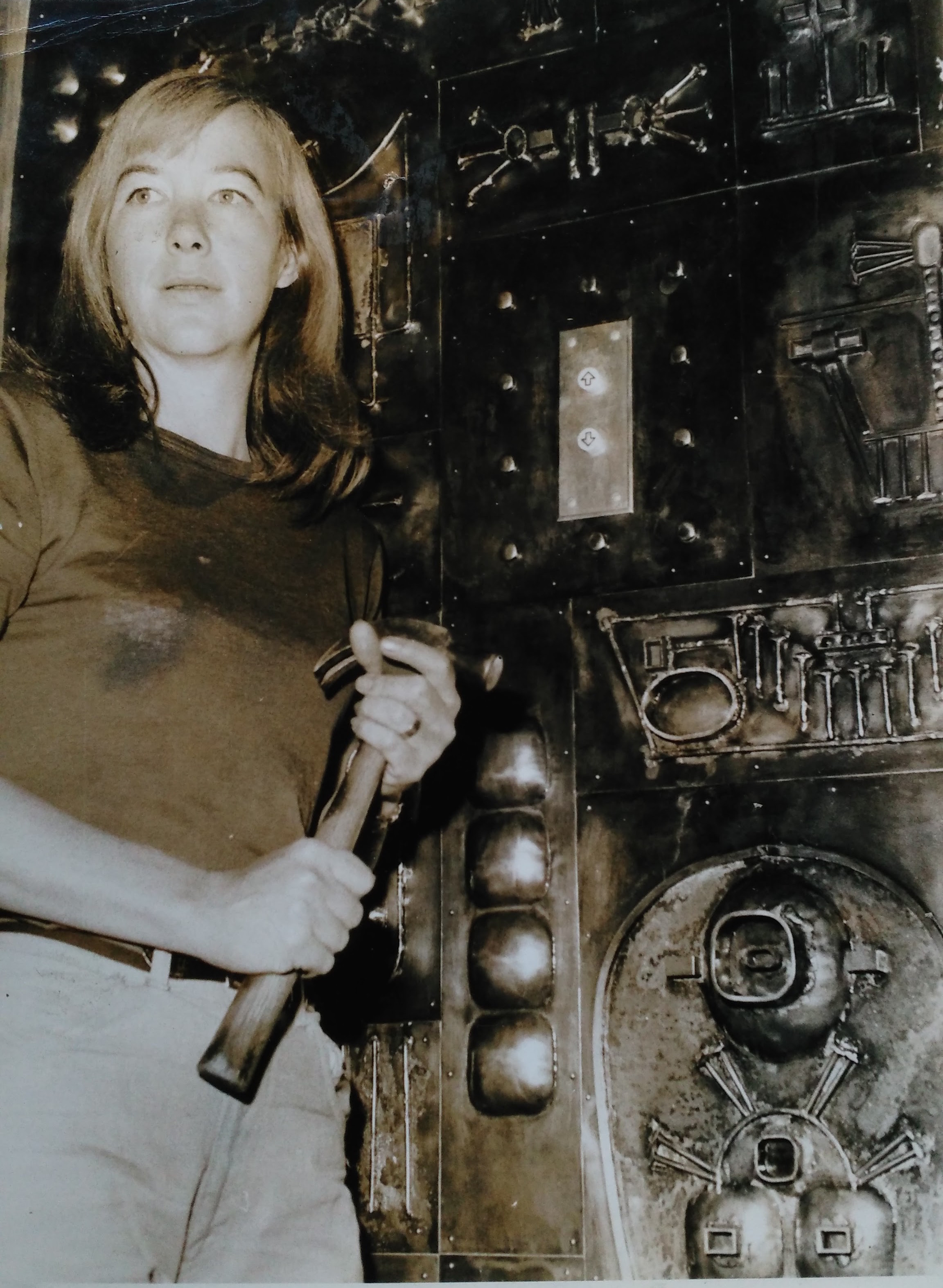
- Jensen in 1966
- Born: 22 March 1933; Potchefstroom, South Africa
- Died: 25 July 2015 (aged 82); Cork, Ireland
- Education: Bachelor of science, Social science, GradDipl(AA) in Planning
- Occupations: Sculptor, Social worker, teacher

Berrell Elizabeth Jensen (22 March 1933 – 25 July 2015) was a South African postwar and contemporary sculptor, social worker, and teacher. She is best known for her works in welded copper and other metals, holding her first exhibition in 1960. She left South Africa for Europe in 1968 and later ran a craft centre in Ireland and adult education and community centres in the United Kingdom.

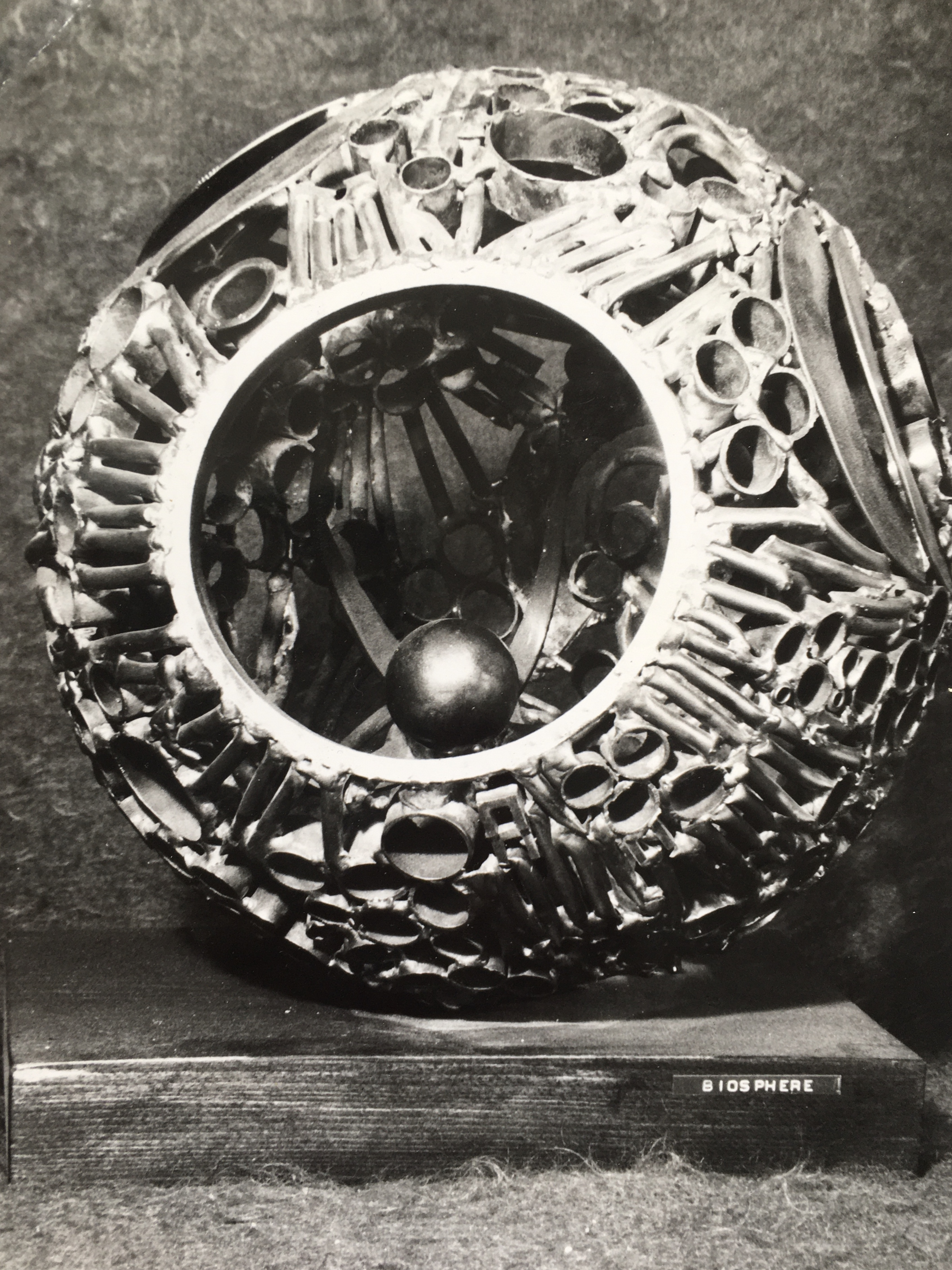

== Early life and education ==
Jensen was born in 1933 in Potchefstroom, South Africa to Phyllis (née Horwood) and Harry Jay. She had three brothers and two half-brothers from her father's previous marriage. Jensen graduated from Natal University in Durban where she completed her bachelor's degree in social science. In 1958 she took a course in metalwork and welding at the Natal Technical College and began to make decorative mobiles, going on to create sculptures using bronze, copper, silver, and enamel. In addition to her work being exhibited she was commissioned to create large-scale work for public buildings. In 1984 Jensen took a diploma in planning from the Architectural Association School of Architecture in London.

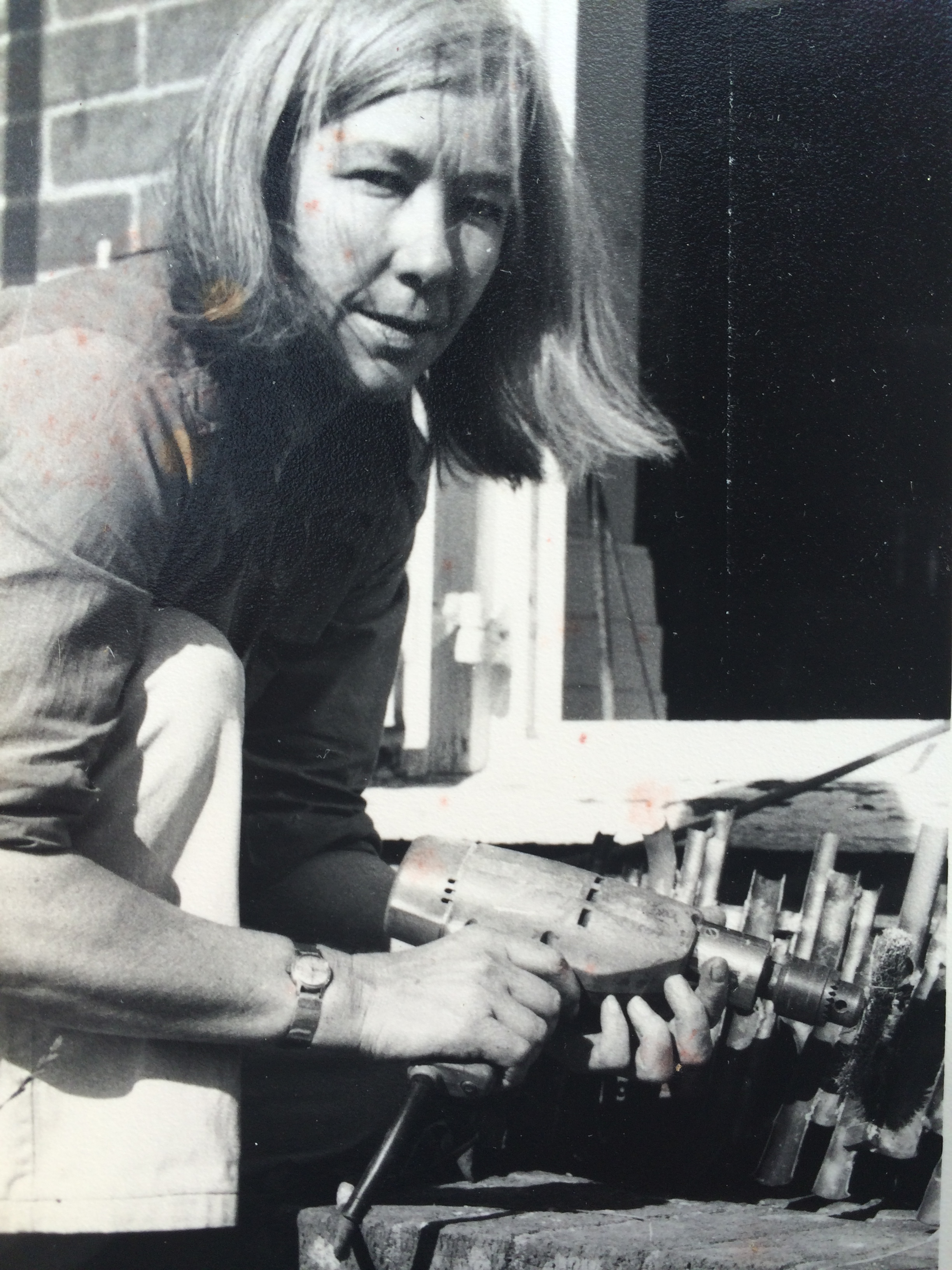

== Personal life ==
In 1957 Jensen married Anton Jensen, a PhD student, with whom she had a son, Michael and a daughter, Sandra. Due to the apartheid regime, she and her husband chose to relocate to Europe from Johannesburg. They stopped at Crete, and the family were involved in a car accident in 1969 in which Jensen's husband was killed. Jensen and her children stayed in Greece and moved briefly to the United Kingdom and then, in 1977, to County Donegal, Ireland, when she was invited by the socialist priest Father James McDyer to establish a craft centre and art studio. Jensen later lived in Belfast and then London where she worked in community service, setting up and running adult education centres and community centres including in Archway, Highgate and Hampstead. She retired to Ireland, but continued to work as a sculptor.

== Career ==
Jensen's first exhibition was in Durban in 1960. She presented 19 further exhibitions over the following eight years. She primarily worked in metal, using the oxy-acetylene torch, hacksaw, metal guillotine and other fabrication methods, also using metal-, resin- and concrete-casting techniques.

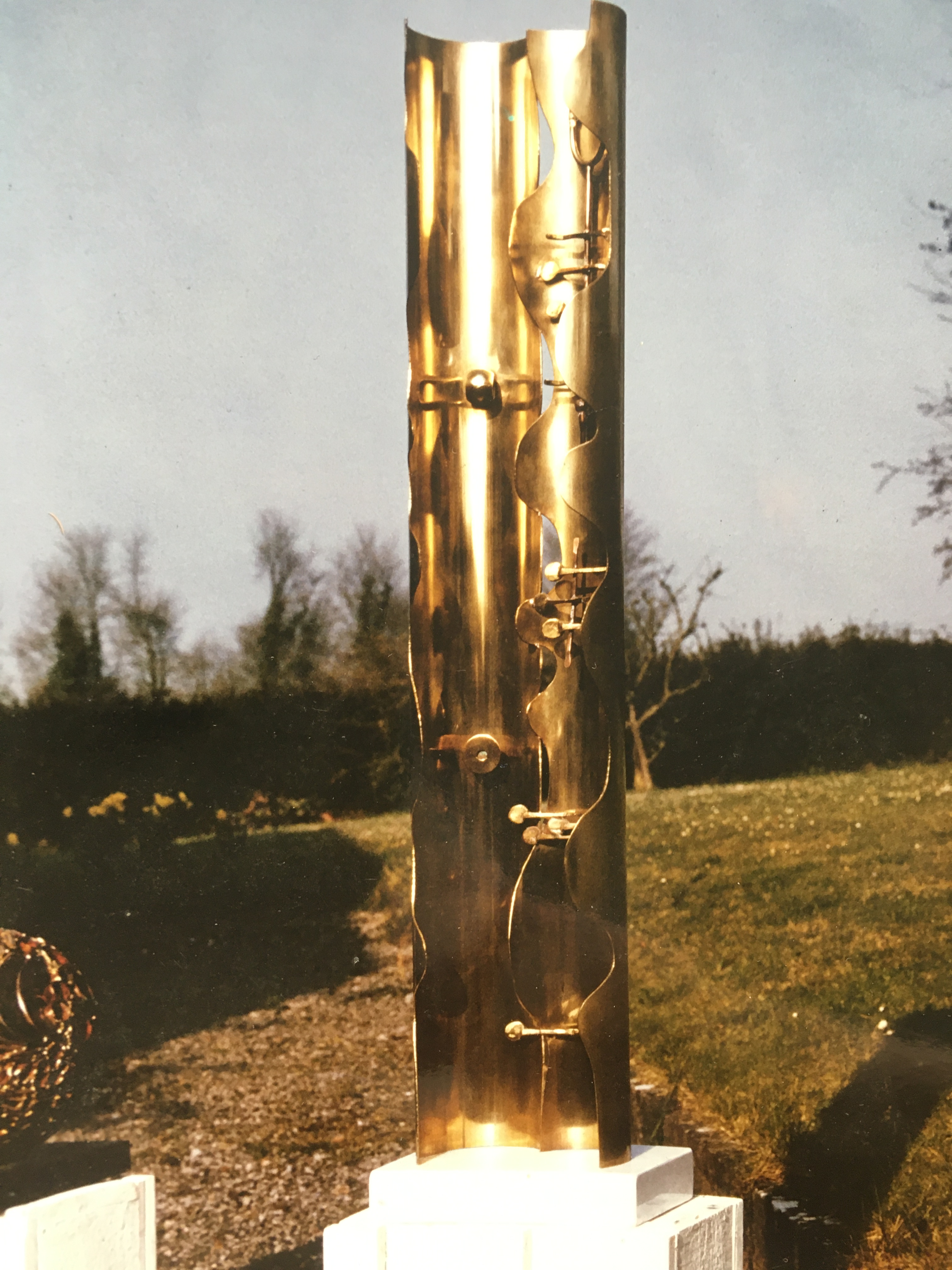

Jensen exhibited in galleries in South Africa and the United Kingdom. She worked on large-scale public commissions for the Netherlands Bank building and the Santam building in Johannesburg, the Philips factory in Germiston, the VIP lounge at Jan Smuts Airport, all in South Africa, and the Windhoek Museum in Namibia. In 1977, Jensen started a craft centre in County Donegal, Ireland. There, she created an art studio to train students in metal and sculptural work, as well as jewellery making, printmaking, and other crafts. She also continued to work on large-scale murals, including at the Longford Westmeath Hospital in Mullingar.

In 1993, Jensen bought a 300-year-old Protestant church in Rochfortbridge, County Westmeath. She renovated the building and installed a metal studio. She recommenced welding and completed commissions for local authorities.

== Community service ==
Jensen was invited to set up a craft centre in Glencolumbkille, Ireland in 1977 as part of an initiative to develop local industries and was later appointed assistant director of an adult education centre in Belfast. In London, she was coordinator of the new Highgate Newtown Community Centre, working with a committee of local people and councillors to prepare activity programmes for the centre, covering sports, advice sessions, craftwork, entertainment and sessions for pensioners, mothers, and babies. She then became Hampstead Community Centre's director, a post she held for nine years. In 2001, Jensen organised a County Westmeath environmental group which advocated against a landfill site in the Killucan area.

== Death ==
Jensen died at the age of 82 in Cork, Ireland, on 25 July 2015.
