= Kilclooney More =

Townland of County Donegal

Coordinates: 54.817718°N 8.4331537°W

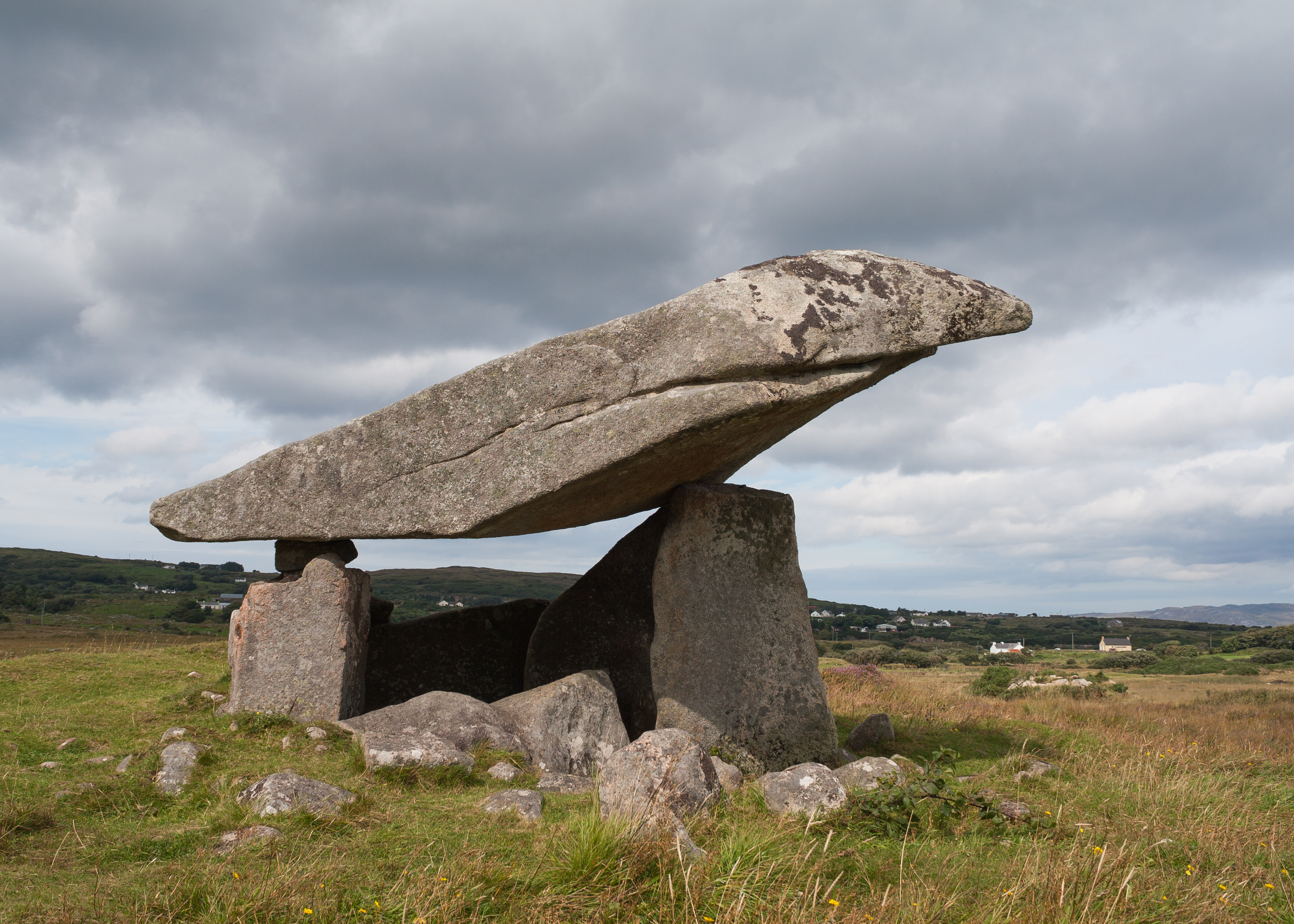
Larger chamber of the eastern portal tomb in Kilclooney More with a capstone that has been described as ‘birdlike’ or ‘Concorde-like’ (Dg. 70)

Kilclooney More (Irish: Cill Chluanadh Mhór, meaning church of the pasture) is a townland in County Donegal, Ireland. It is situated halfway between Narin and Ardara, on the R261 road on the Loughrea Peninsula.

== Megalithic tombs ==
Kilclooney More belongs to the low-lying land in the west of County Donegal that is prominent for its concentration of court and portal tombs. In the Neolithic period this land was fertile due to a warmer and drier climate, supporting farming communities who crafted ceramics and built tombs which are still described as ‘magnificent’.

=== Portal tomb Dg. 68 ===
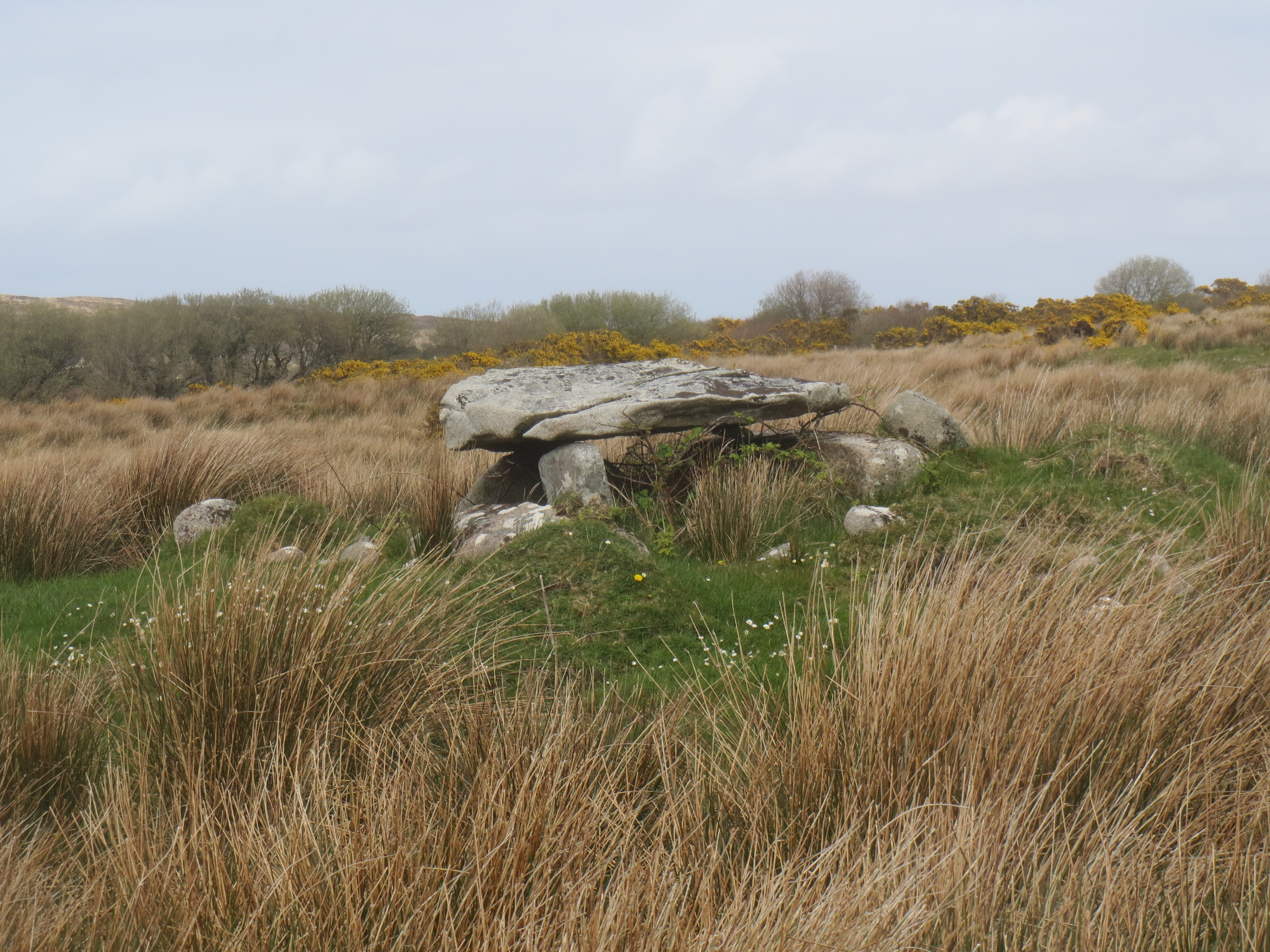
Western portal tomb of Kilclooney More (Dg. 68)

The smaller portal tomb of Kilclooney More is located west of the R261, in a shallow basin north of the Abberachrin River. The eastern portal stone is missing but otherwise the tomb is well preserved. The chamber is comparatively small, measuring 1.45 m × 1.2 m, pointed in SSE direction. It is referred to as Dg. 68 by Eamon Cody.

=== Court tomb Dg. 69 ===
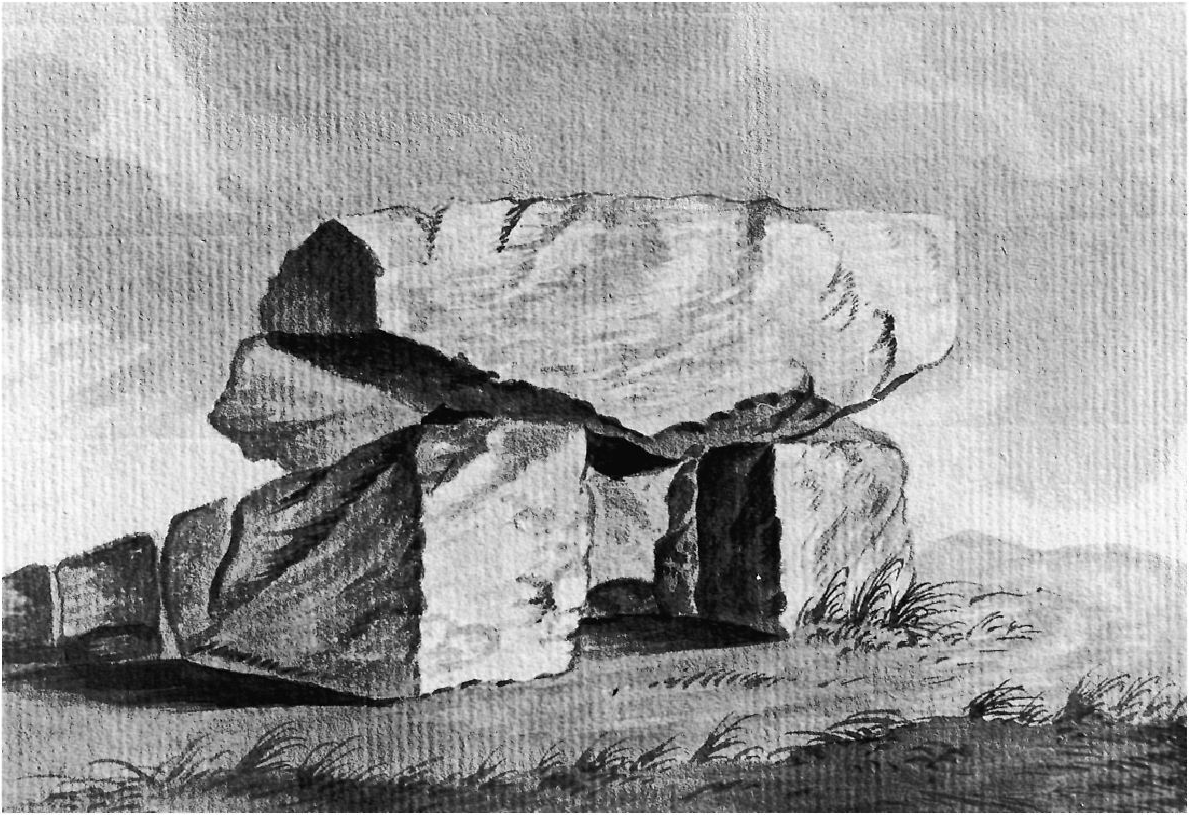
18th-century drawing of the court tomb of Kilclooney More when the lintel was still in its original place (Dg. 69)

The court tomb Dg. 69 is located north of the portal tomb Dg. 68 and likewise west of the R261 on flat moorland above the basin on a small hill that provides a commanding outlook in all directions. The gallery of the monument has a length of c. 6 m and a width of 2.0 to 2.5 m with three orthostats on each side. There are no surviving traces of a segmentation into chambers but de Valera assumes that the tomb consisted of two chambers. A heavy lintel that still resides on the side stones appears to be displaced and reversed in consideration of an 18th-century drawing that shows the lintel above the front of the gallery. Another lintel appears to be fallen and rests in front.

=== Portal tomb Dg. 70 ===
East of the R261 on rough moorland is the larger portal tomb Dg. 70 with two chambers, 9 m apart, and a modern field wall in-between. The north-eastern chamber has a roof stone with a length of 4.2 m which rests on two portal stones, both of 1.8 m height, and a very small pad-stone which in turn rests on the backstone of 1.3 m height. The smaller, south-western chamber has portal stones of 1 m height. The roof stone with a length of 1.9 m is partly dislodged. The sill stone between the portal stones has a rectangular piece missing, a feature that is shared with the portal tombs of Poulnabrone, Ballybrittas, and Tawnatruffaun. Most of the stones are from grey granite outcrops in close vicinity to the tomb. The backstone in red Ardara granite stands in a stark contrast to the overall grey, it originates possibly from a cliffy extrusion 200 m south of the tomb.

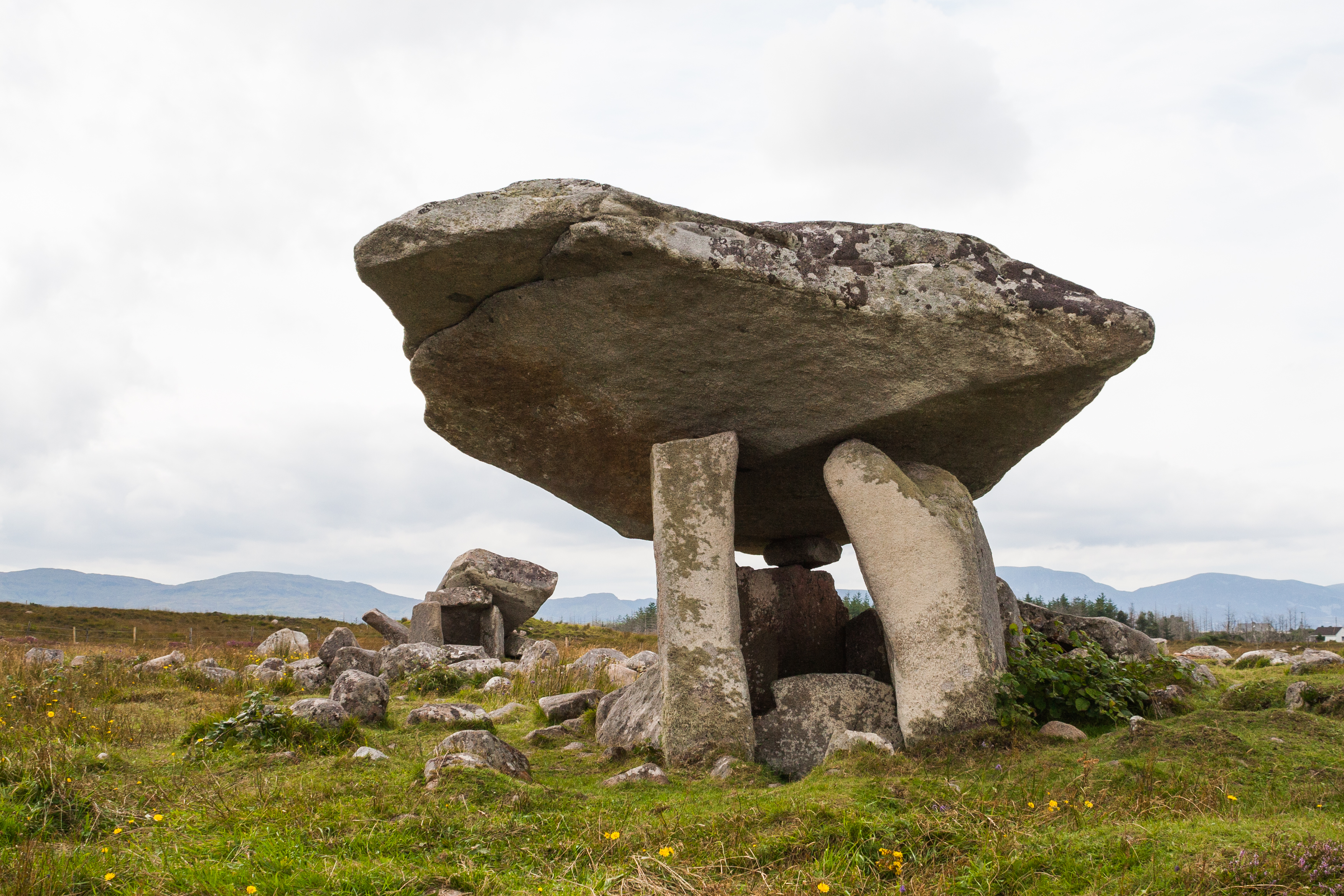
Dg. 70 with its NE-aligned larger chamber in front and its NNE-aligned smaller chamber in the background

The poorly-preserved cairn has a long shape with an NNE alignment that extends over 25 m. The chambers are in the middle of the cairn with the north-eastern chamber 5 m inside its northern end. The smaller chamber faces NNE, the larger chamber NE. Like almost all coastal portal tombs in Ireland it is oriented away from the sea with the backstone facing the coast. The combination of a long cairn with a minor chamber as in Kilclooney More and Ballyrennan in County Tyrone is seen by Ó Nualláin as an indication that portal tombs evolved from court tombs.

Multiple sherds of Neolithic pottery, all belonging to one quartz-tempered vessel with fine textures, were found in the larger chamber and are now in the possession of the National Museum of Ireland. Dating of Irish portal tombs is difficult as no radiocarbon dates are available. However, the sherds are assumed to belong to the Lyles Hill series of pottery which can be approximately dated as this kind of pottery has been found close to fireplaces at other sites. In consideration of this context, Arthur ApSimon estimates that portal tombs like those of Kilclooney More belong to a period from 5000 to 4800 BP, i.e. from ca. 3780 to ca. 3550 BC, which falls into the early Neolithic period.
