= Ardara Road Halt railway station =

Railway station in Ireland

Ardara Road Halt Ard an Rátha

General information
- Location: Killybegs, County Donegal; Ireland
- Coordinates: 54.6604°N 8.4111°W

History
- Original company: County Donegal Railways Joint Committee

Key dates
- 18 August 1893: Station opens as Ardara Road
- 1910: Name changed to Ardara Road Halt
- 1 January 1960: Station closes

Services
Preceding station	Disused railways	Following station
Bruckless	County Donegal Railways Joint Committee; Killybegs to Strabane line	Killybegs
Location

Ardara Road Halt was a station which served Ardara in County Donegal, Ireland.

== History ==
The station was opened by the Donegal Railway Company, and became part of the County Donegal Railways Joint Committee railways in 1906 when the original company was bought jointly by the Great Northern Railway of Ireland and the Northern Counties Committee.

This organisation ran the line until its closure.
