= R261 road (Ireland) =

Road in Ireland

R261 road
- Bóthar R261
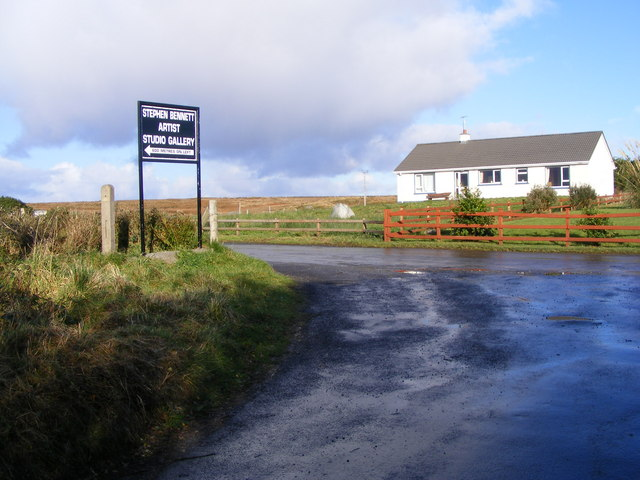
- Junction near Ardara

Route information
- Length: 13.5 km (8.4 mi)

Major junctions
- From: N56 at Maas, County Donegal
- To: N56 at Ardara

Location
- Country: Ireland

Highway system
- Roads in Ireland; Motorways; Primary; Secondary; Regional
← R260	→ R262

The R261 road is a regional road in Ireland. It is a loop road from the N56 road on the Loughrea Peninsula in County Donegal. The road forms part of the Wild Atlantic Way.

The R261 travels west from the N56 at Maas to a minor road leading to the beach villages of Narin and Portnoo. From this junction the road travels south, passing the megalithic tombs of Kilclooney More, to rejoin the N56 at Ardara. The R261 is 13.5 km (8.4 mi) long.
