= Silver Strand =

Silver Strand may refer to:

- Silver Strand (film), a 1995 action film directed by George Miller
- Silver Strand Beach, a beach neighborhood near Oxnard, California
- Silver Strand (San Diego), an isthmus in San Diego County, California
- Silver Strand Falls, a waterfall in Yosemite National Park
- The Silver Strand (Ireland), a beach in southwest County Donegal, Ireland
- Silverstrand Beach, in Clear Water Bay Peninsula, Sai Kung, Hong Kong
- Silver Strand is an alternate name for the Marina Peninsula neighborhood of Los Angeles
