= Mountcharles railway station =

Railway station in Ireland

Mountcharles

General information
- Location: Mountcharles, County Donegal; Ireland

History
- Original company: West Donegal Railway
- Post-grouping: County Donegal Railways Joint Committee

Key dates
- 18 August 1893: Station opens
- 1 January 1960: Station closes
Location

Mountcharles railway station served Mountcharles in County Donegal, Ireland.

The station opened on 18 August 1893 on the Donegal Railway Company line from Donegal to Killybegs.

The station goods shed at Mountcharles Railway Station is all that remains, built in 1893 from sandstone, was originally used for freight handling but now serves as part of a funeral home.

It closed on 1 January 1960.

== Routes ==
| Preceding station | Disused railways | Following station |
|---|---|---|
| Killymard Halt | Donegal Railway Company; Donegal to Killybegs | Doorin Road |
