= Inver, County Donegal =

Village in County Donegal, Ireland

Inver Inbhear
- Village
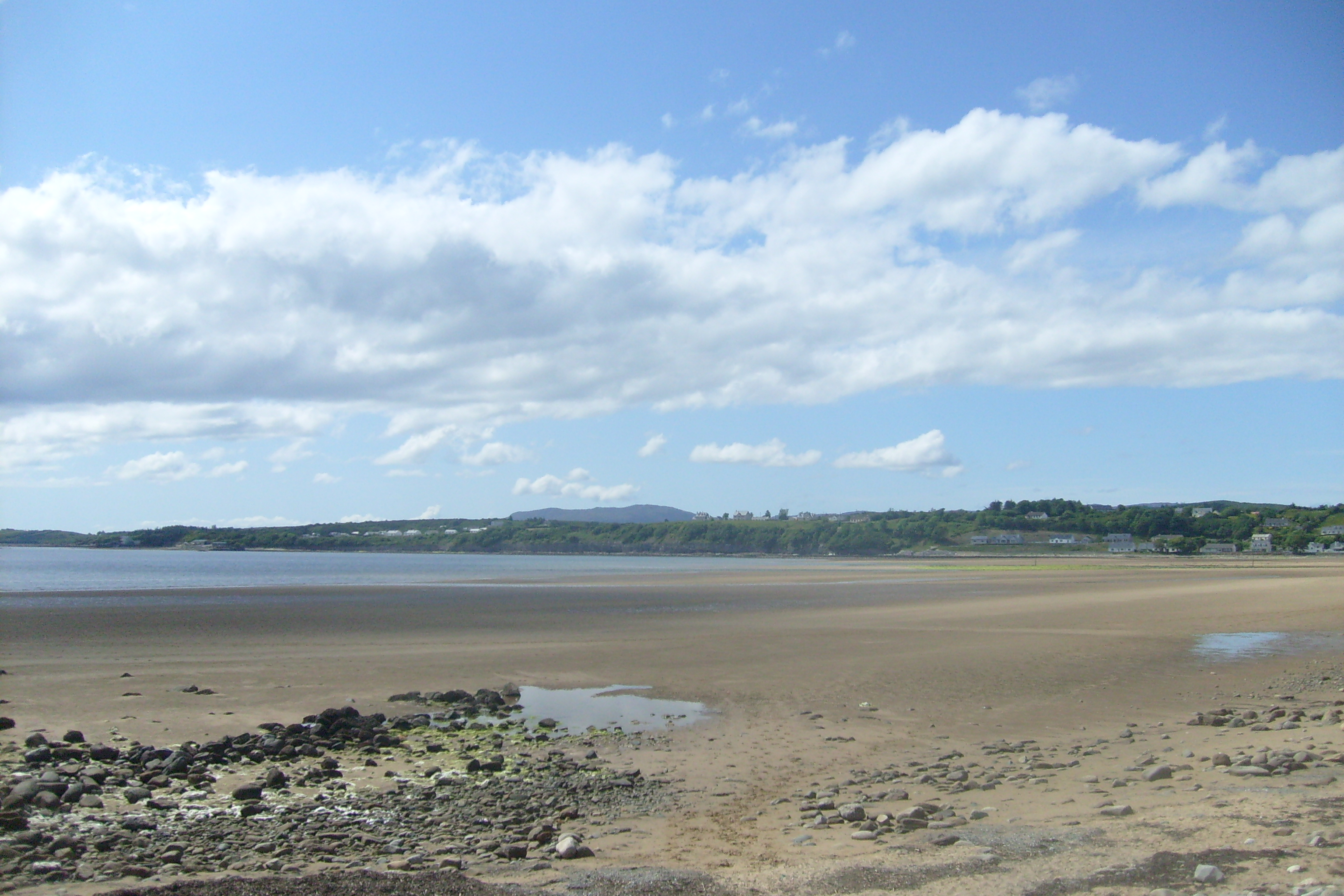
- Inver and Inver Beach

- Location in Ireland
- Coordinates: 54°38′55″N 8°17′52″W
- Country: Ireland
- Province: Ulster
- County: County Donegal
- Barony: Banagh
- Time zone: UTC+0 (WET)
  - Summer (DST): UTC-1 (IST (WEST))

Inver (Irish: Inbhear, meaning 'estuary') is a small village in County Donegal, Ireland. It lies on the N56 National secondary road midway between Donegal town to the east and Killybegs to the west. Inver is also a civil parish in the barony of Banagh.

== History ==
St Natalis (or Naail), who died in 563, was the abbot of a monastery in Invernayle (Inver). In 1460, a Franciscan monastery was founded on the same site.

Inver graveyard dates back to 1731. A Church of Ireland (Anglican) church was built in 1622, with a new building completed in 1807.

There was a recognised settlement in Inver in 1837. At that time it was noted that 11,785 people lived there, with five schools teaching 360 children.

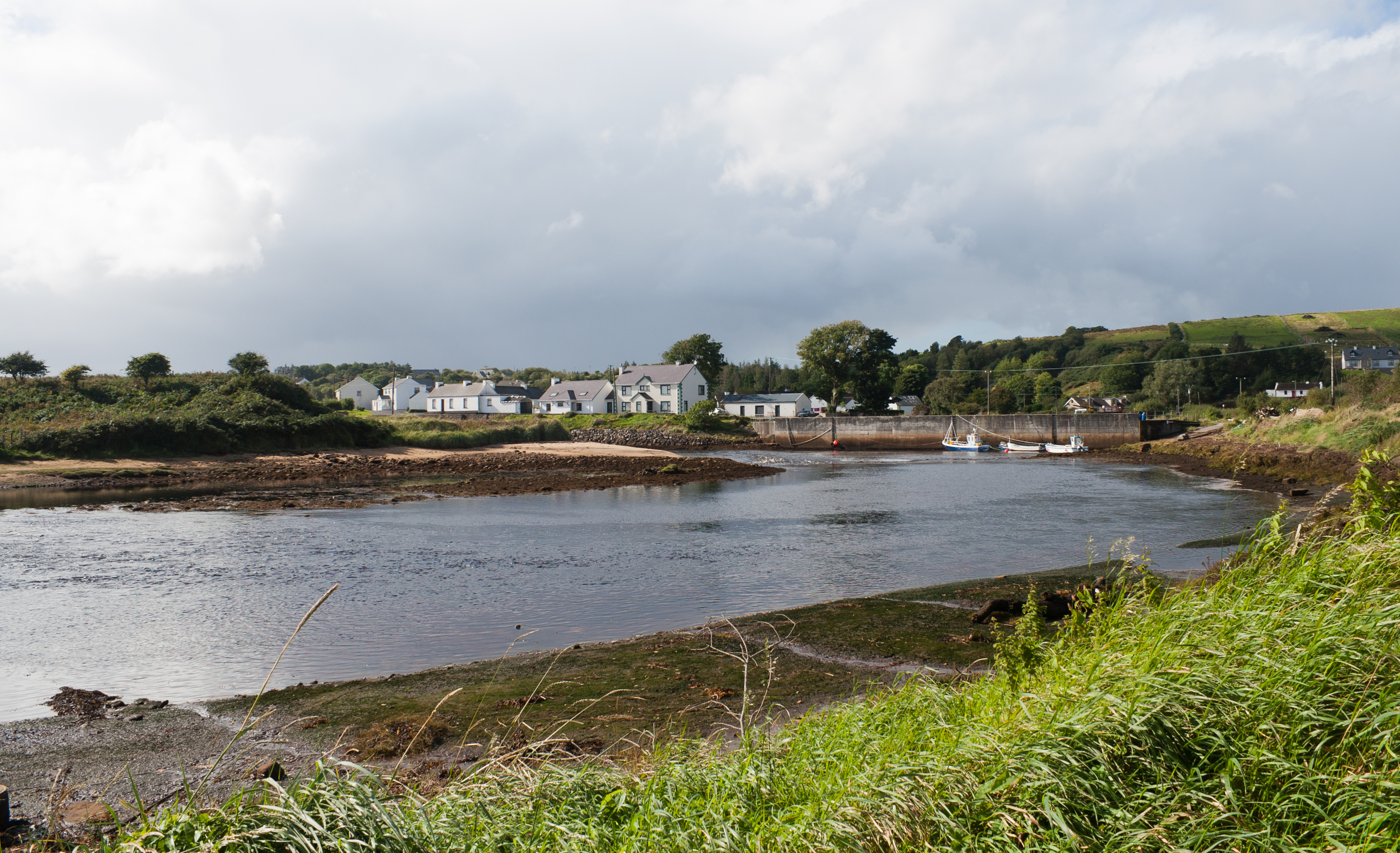
Inver Harbour

Inver was a whaling post in the past, with a whaling station in the Port of Inver, 3km (2 miles) from the town. Its ruins can still be seen in the port. Whale and dolphin spotting is popular in the area.

== Facilities ==
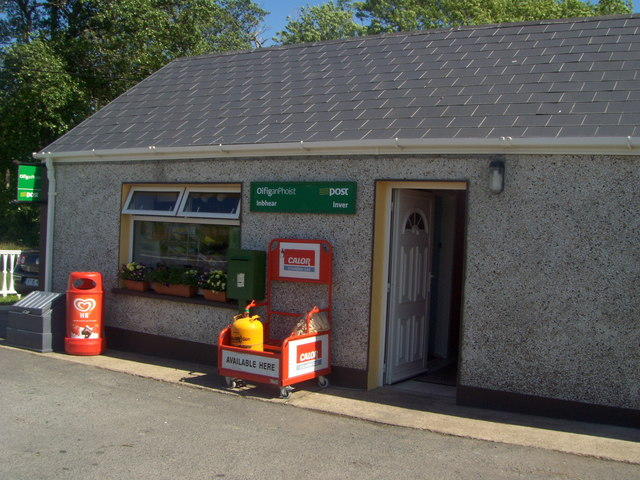
Post office in Inver, County Donegal

Inver has three Christian churches: one Catholic, one Anglican and one Methodist. There is also one shop and sub-post office in the village.

The village has a football pitch which hosts Eany Celtic in the Donegal League.

Inver Grove Heights, Minnesota may be named after Inver.

== Transport ==
Inver railway station opened on 18 August 1893 and closed on 1 January 1960.

== Civil parish of Inver ==
The civil parish contains the villages of Inver, Frosses and Mountcharles.

=== Townlands ===
The civil parish of Inver contains over 100 townlands, including:

- Altcor
- Ardaght Glebe
- Ardbane
- Ballybrollaghan
- Ballymacahil
- Bonnyglen
- Brenter
- Buncronan
- Carraduffy
- Carrakeel
- Casheloogary
- Clogheravaddy
- Cloverhill (also known as Drumbeg)
- Coolshangan
- Cranny Lower
- Cranny Upper
- Creevins
- Cronacarckfree
- Cronaslieve
- Crumlin
- Derryhirk
- Disert
- Dromore
- Drumadart
- Drumagraa
- Drumaneary
- Drumard
- Drumatumpher
- Drumbaran
- Drumbeagh
- Drumbeg (also known as Cloverhill)
- Drumboarty
- Drumcoe
- Drumconor
- Drumduff
- Drumfin
- Drumgorman
- Drumgorman Barr
- Drumkeelan
- Drumlaghtafin
- Drummacachapple
- Drummacacullen
- Drummeenanagh
- Drumnacarry
- Drumnaheark East
- Drumnaheark West
- Drumnakilly
- Drumnalost
- Drumrainy
- Drumrone
- Eagle's Nest
- Edenamuck
- Fanaghans
- Gargrim
- Glencoagh
- Gortaward
- Hall Demesne
- Inver Glebe
- Keeloges
- Killin
- Kilmacreddan
- Knockagar
- Knocknahorna
- Leagans
- Legnawley Glebe
- Letterbarra
- Letterfad
- Lettermore
- Letternacahy
- Lettertreane
- Luaghnabrogue
- Meenacahan
- Meenacharbet
- Meenacloghspar
- Meenacurrin
- Meenagranoge
- Meenagrau
- Meenaguse Beg
- Meenawullaghan
- Meentacor
- Meentacreeghan
- Meentanakill
- Meenybraddan
- Mountcharles
- Mullanboys
- Munterneese
- Point
- Port
- Rafoarty
- Raneely
- Rock
- Roes
- Sallows
- Salthill Demesne
- Seahill and Tuckmill Hill
- Sheskinatawy
- Tamur
- Tawnygorm
- Tievachorky
- Tievedooly
- Tonregee
- Tuckmill Hill & Seahill
- Tullinlagan
- Tullinlough
- Tullycumber
- Tullynaglack
- Tullynagreana
- Tullynaha
- Tullytrasna
- Tullyvoos

== See also ==
- List of towns and villages in the Republic of Ireland
- Aber and Inver (placename elements)
