= Doorin Road railway station =

Railway station in Ireland

Doorin Road

General information
- Location: Doorin Point, County Donegal; Ireland

History
- Original company: West Donegal Railway
- Post-grouping: County Donegal Railways Joint Committee

Key dates
- 18 August 1893: Station opens
- 1 January 1960: Station closes
Location

Doorin Road railway station served Doorin Point in County Donegal, Ireland.

The station opened on 18 August 1893 on the Donegal Railway Company line from Donegal to Killybegs, and it closed on 1 January 1960.

== Routes ==
| Preceding station | Disused railways | Following station |
|---|---|---|
| Mountcharles | Donegal Railway Company; Donegal to Killybegs | Mullanboy Halt |
