= Dunkineely railway station =

Railway station in Ireland

Dunkineely

General information
- Location: Dunkineely, County Donegal; Ireland

History
- Original company: West Donegal Railway
- Post-grouping: County Donegal Railways Joint Committee

Key dates
- 18 August 1893: Station opens
- 1 January 1960: Station closes
Location

Dunkineely railway station served Dunkineely in County Donegal, Ireland.

The station opened on 18 October 1893 on the Donegal Railway Company line from Donegal to Killybegs.

It closed on 1 January 1960.

== Routes ==
| Preceding station | Disused railways | Following station |
|---|---|---|
| Port | Donegal Railway Company; Donegal to Killybegs | Bruckless |
