= Bruckless railway station =

Railway station in Ireland

Bruckless
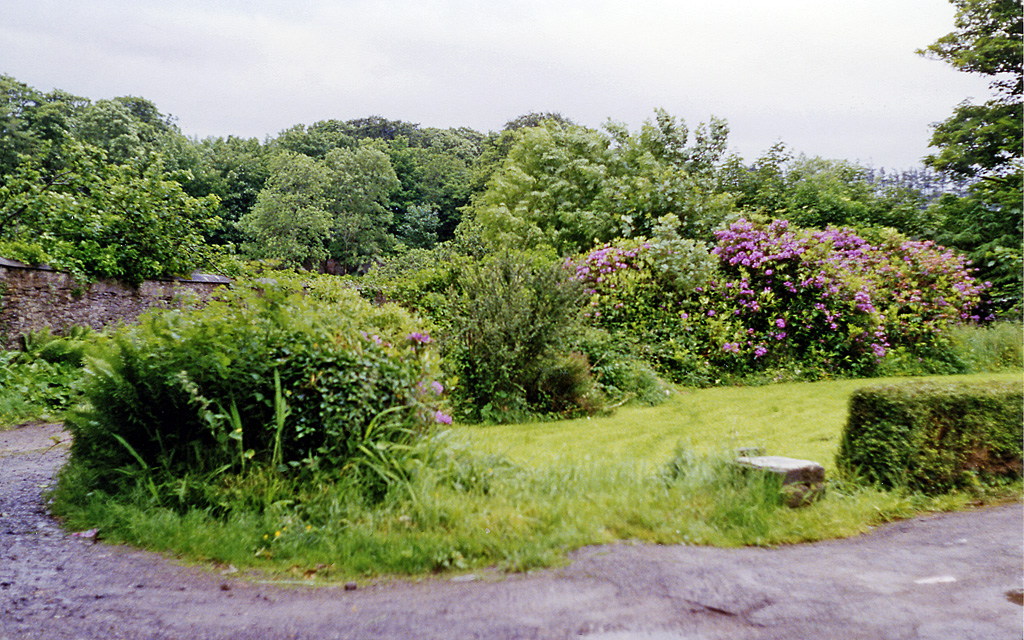
- Site of Bruckless Station

General information
- Location: Bruckless, County Donegal; Ireland
- Coordinates: 54.634231°N 8.38986°W

History
- Original company: West Donegal Railway
- Post-grouping: County Donegal Railways Joint Committee

Key dates
- 18 August 1893: Station opens
- 1 January 1960: Station closes
Location

Bruckless railway station served Bruckless in County Donegal, Ireland.

The station opened on 18 October 1893 on the Donegal Railway Company line from Donegal to Killybegs.

It closed on 1 January 1960.

== Routes ==
Preceding station	Disused railways	Following station
Dunkineely	Donegal Railway Company; Donegal to Killybegs	Ardara Road
