= Inver railway station =

Former railway station in County Donegal, Ireland

Inver
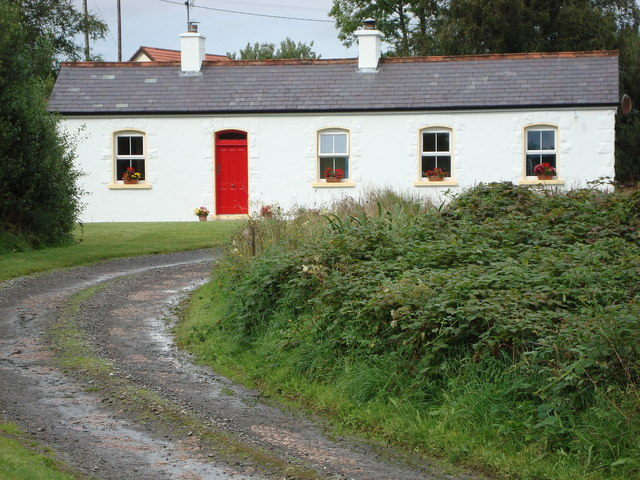
- Inver railway station in 2008

General information
- Location: Inver, County Donegal; Ireland
- Coordinates: 54.657241°N 8.27721°W
- Elevation: 28 ft (8.5 m)

History
- Original company: West Donegal Railway
- Post-grouping: County Donegal Railways Joint Committee

Key dates
- 18 August 1893: Station opens
- 1 January 1960: Station closes
Location

Inver railway station served Inver in County Donegal, Ireland.

The station opened on 18 August 1893 on the Donegal Railway Company line from Donegal to Killybegs.

It closed on 1 January 1960.

== Routes ==
Preceding station	Disused railways	Following station
Mullanboy Halt	Donegal Railway Company; Donegal to Killybegs	Port
