= Bruckless =

Village in County Donegal, Ireland

Bruckless An Bhroclais
- Village
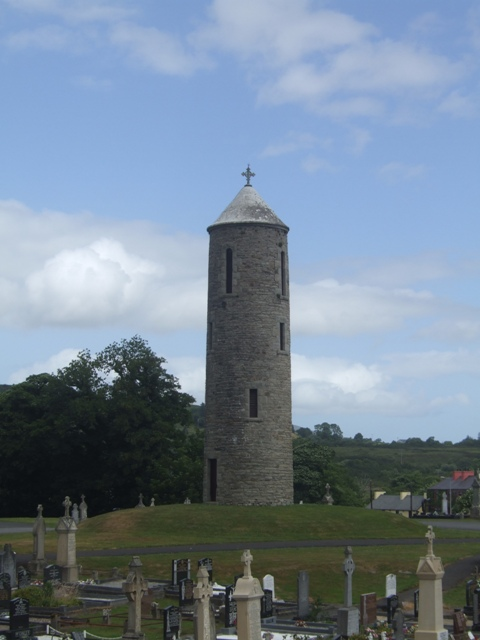
- Round tower - Bruckless

- Location in Ireland
- Coordinates: 54°38′N 8°23′W
- Country: Ireland
- Province: Ulster
- County: County Donegal

Government
  - Dáil Éireann: Donegal
- Time zone: UTC+0 (WET)
  - Summer (DST): UTC-1 (IST (WEST))
- Area code: 074, +000 353 74
- Irish Grid Reference: G711767

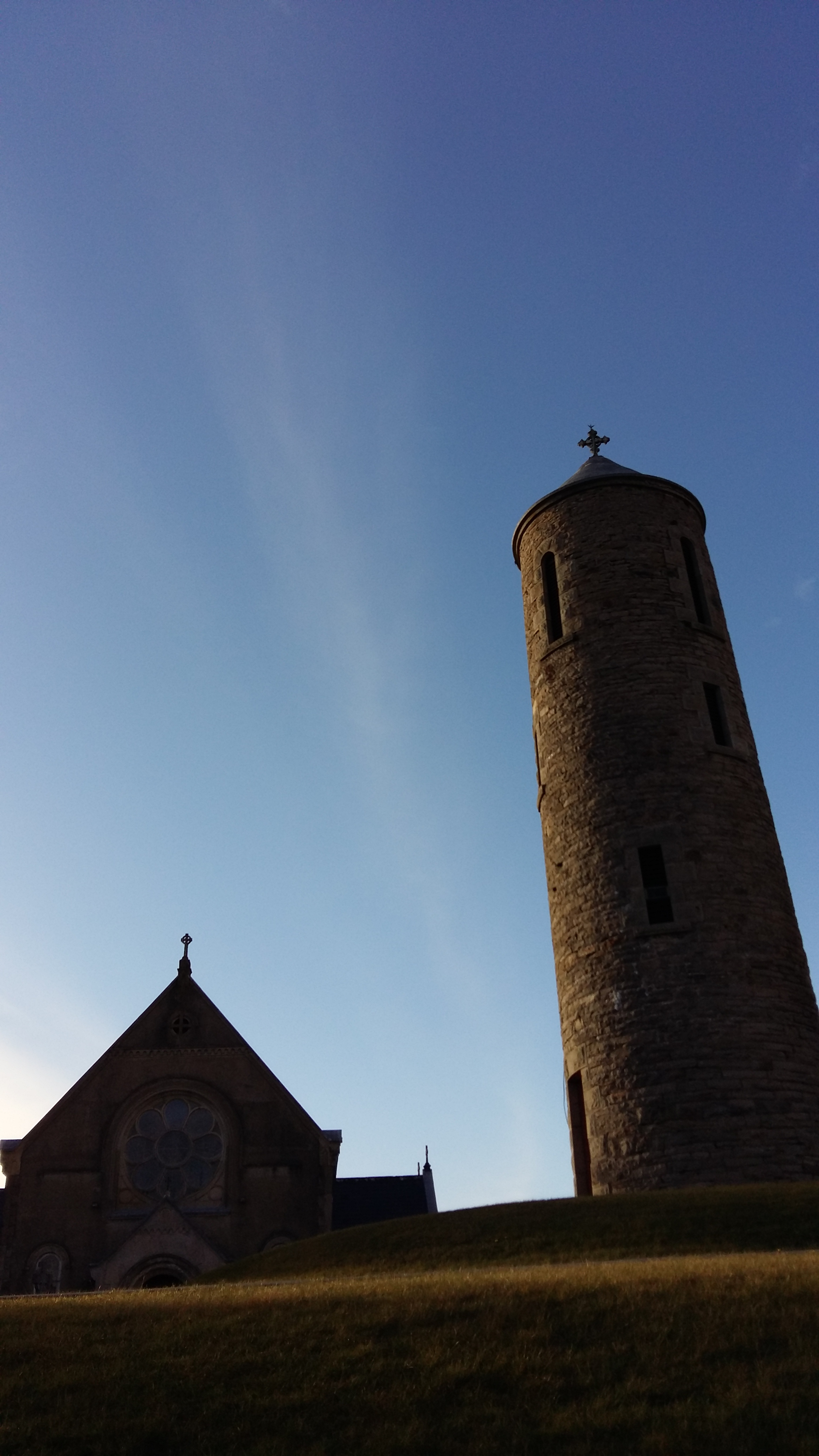
Round tower and church, Bruckless

Bruckless (Irish: An Bhroclais, meaning 'badger's den') is a village in southwest County Donegal, Ireland. It lies on the N56 national secondary road which links it to Donegal Town 20 km east and to Killybegs 7 km west. The village overlooks McSwyne's Bay, an inlet in Donegal Bay. Bruckless is part of the Roman Catholic parish of Killaghtee and the diocese of Raphoe. In the Church of Ireland, it is covered by the parish of Inver and the diocese of Derry and Raphoe.

The parish church, the Church of Saints Joseph and Conal, is noted for its round tower and there are numerous archaeological artifacts in the area, including early Christian cross slabs. The village pub is called Mary Murrins, and the village also has a small shop. The village has close ties with neighbouring Dunkineely.

On 11 February 1813, 200 fishing boats (Currach) capsized during a storm while fishing for herring at night in Bruckless Bay. At least 80 lives were lost near St. Johns Point. This tragedy remains one of the worst maritime disasters in modern Irish history. An engraved stone marking the disaster is located near Castle Murray House, overlooking the Bay.

Bruckless railway station opened on 18 October 1893 on the Donegal Railway Company line from Donegal Town to Killybegs. It closed on 1 January 1960.

== See also ==
- List of towns and villages in Ireland
