= Port railway station =

Railway station in Ireland

Port
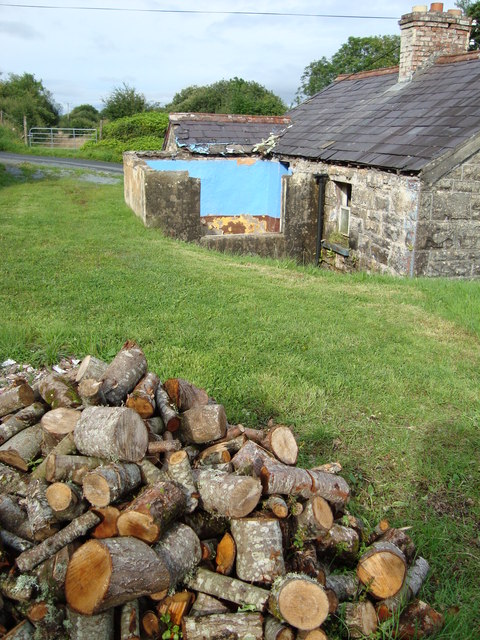
- Port Station House: County Donegal Railway Port is a small fishing village near Inver, once facilitated by the Killybegs Branch of the County Donegal Railway. The grass shows where the track once was.

General information
- Location: Port, County Donegal, County Donegal; Ireland
- Coordinates: 54.63977°N 8.3069°W

History
- Original company: West Donegal Railway
- Post-grouping: County Donegal Railways Joint Committee

Key dates
- 18 October 1893: Station opens
- 1 January 1960: Station closes
Location

Port railway station served Port, County Donegal, Ireland.

The station opened on 18 October 1893 on the Donegal Railway Company line from Donegal to Killybegs.

It closed on 1 January 1960.

== Routes ==
Preceding station	Disused railways	Following station
Inver	Donegal Railway Company; Donegal to Killybegs	Dunkineely
