= R262 road (Ireland) =

Road in Ireland

Coordinates: 54.674192°N 8.244954°W

R262 road
- Bóthar R262
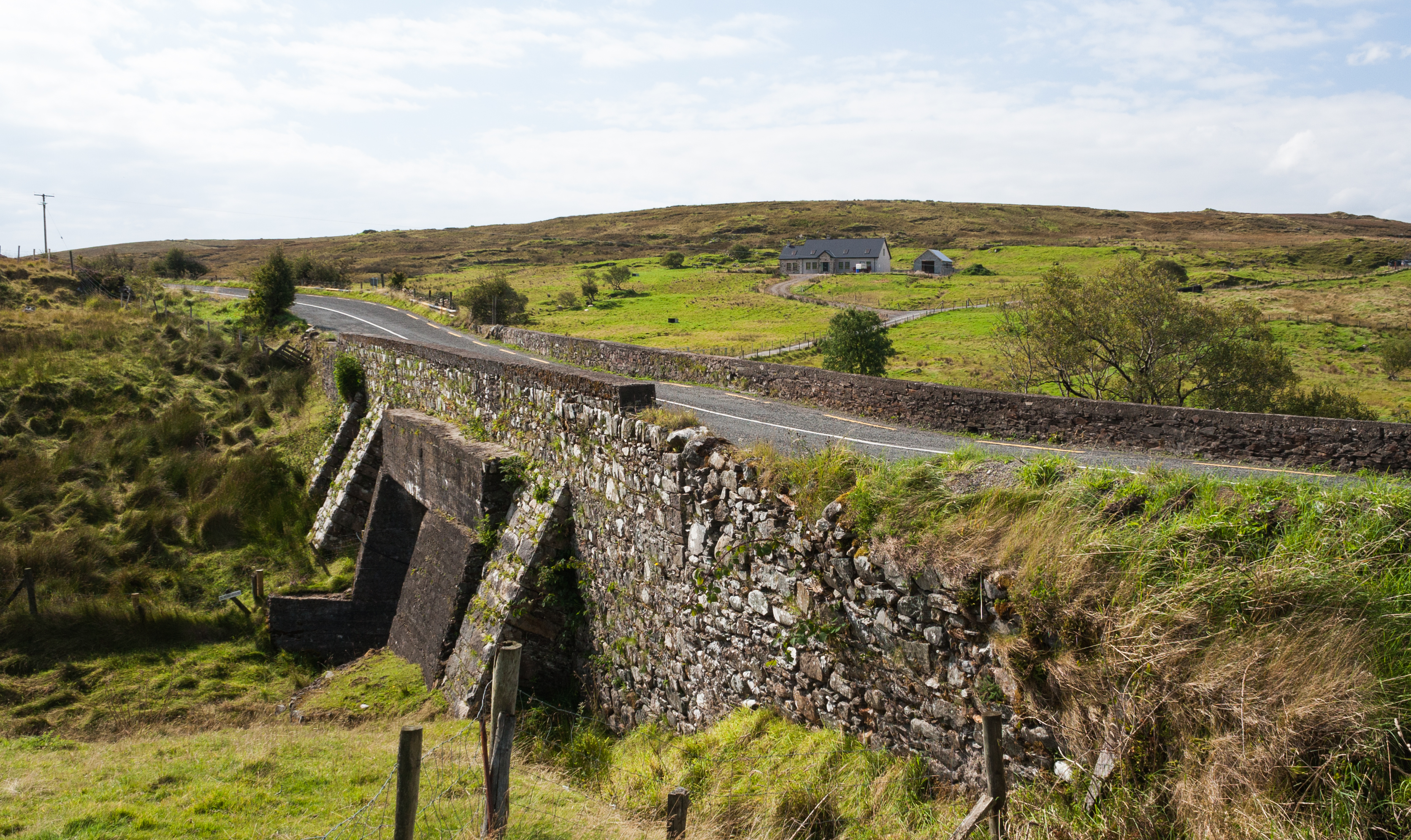
- Bridge on the R262, Tullynaglaggan

Route information
- Length: 17.8 km (11.1 mi)

Major junctions
- From: N56 Kilrean (west of Glenties)
- To: N56 Drumbeagh

Location
- Country: Ireland

Highway system
- Roads in Ireland; Motorways; Primary; Secondary; Regional

The R262 road is a regional road in Ireland, located in County Donegal. It connects the N56 at Kilrean to the same road at Drumbeagh, avoiding Ardara and Dunkineely.
