= Killybegs railway station =

Station in County Donegal, Ireland

Killybegs

General information
- Location: Killybegs, County Donegal; Ireland

History
- Original company: West Donegal Railway
- Post-grouping: County Donegal Railways Joint Committee

Key dates
- 18 August 1893: Station opens
- 1 January 1960: Station closes
Location

Killybegs railway station served Killybegs in County Donegal, Ireland.

== History ==
The station opened on 18 October 1893 on the Donegal Railway Company line from Donegal to Killybegs.

In February 1924 the goods shed was burgled and four cases of whiskey were taken.

It closed on 1 January 1960.

== Routes ==
| Preceding station | Disused railways | Following station |
|---|---|---|
| Ardara Road Halt | Donegal Railway Company; Donegal to Killybegs | Terminus |
