= Mullanboy Halt railway station =

Railway station in Ireland

Mullanboy Halt

General information
- Location: Mullanboy, County Donegal; Ireland

History
- Original company: West Donegal Railway
- Post-grouping: County Donegal Railways Joint Committee

Key dates
- 1 April 1933: Station opens
- 1 January 1960: Station closes

Mullanboy Halt railway station served Mullanboy in County Donegal, Ireland.

The station opened on 1 April 1933 on the Donegal Railway Company line from Donegal to Killybegs.

It closed on 1 January 1960.

== Routes ==
Preceding station	Disused railways	Following station
Doorin Road	Donegal Railway Company; Donegal to Killybegs	Inver
