= The Silver Strand (Ireland) =

Beach in County Donegal, Ireland

Coordinates: 54.664252°N 8.77528°W

The Silver Strand (Irish: An Trá Bhán) is a horse-shoe shaped beach situated at Malin Beg (Irish: Málainn Bhig), near Glencolmcille, in the south-west of County Donegal in Ulster, the northern province in Ireland. Several 'wee burns' (the Ulster-Scots phrase for 'small streams') flow into Donegal Bay at Silver Strand.

View of Silver Strand beach

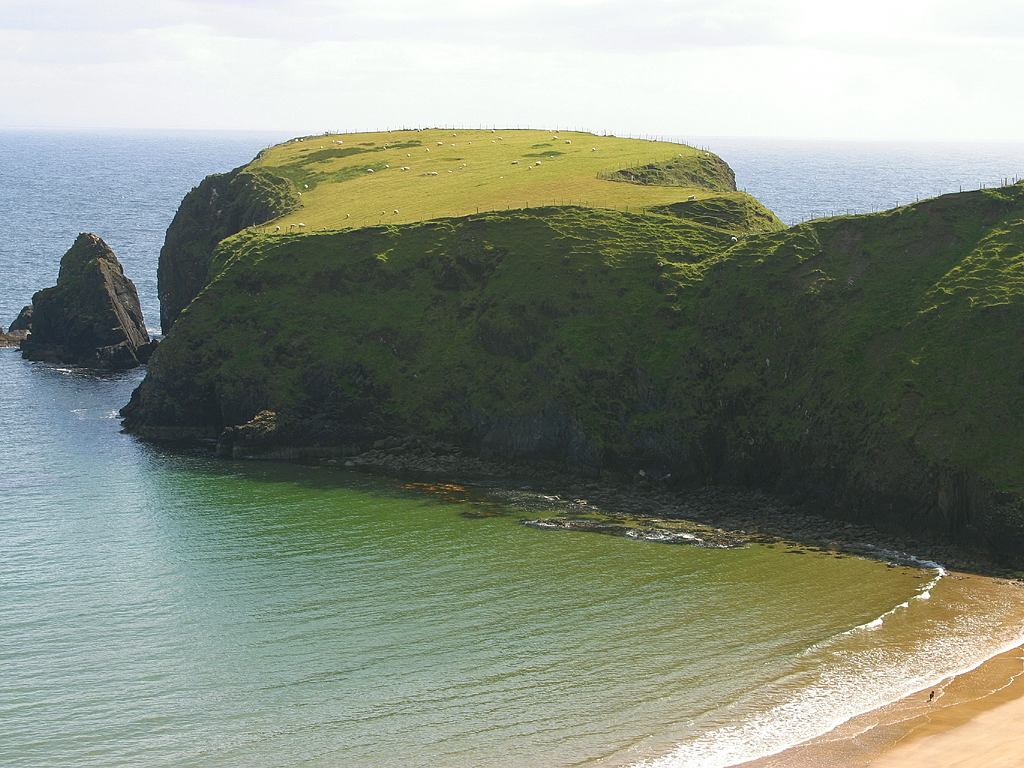
Another view

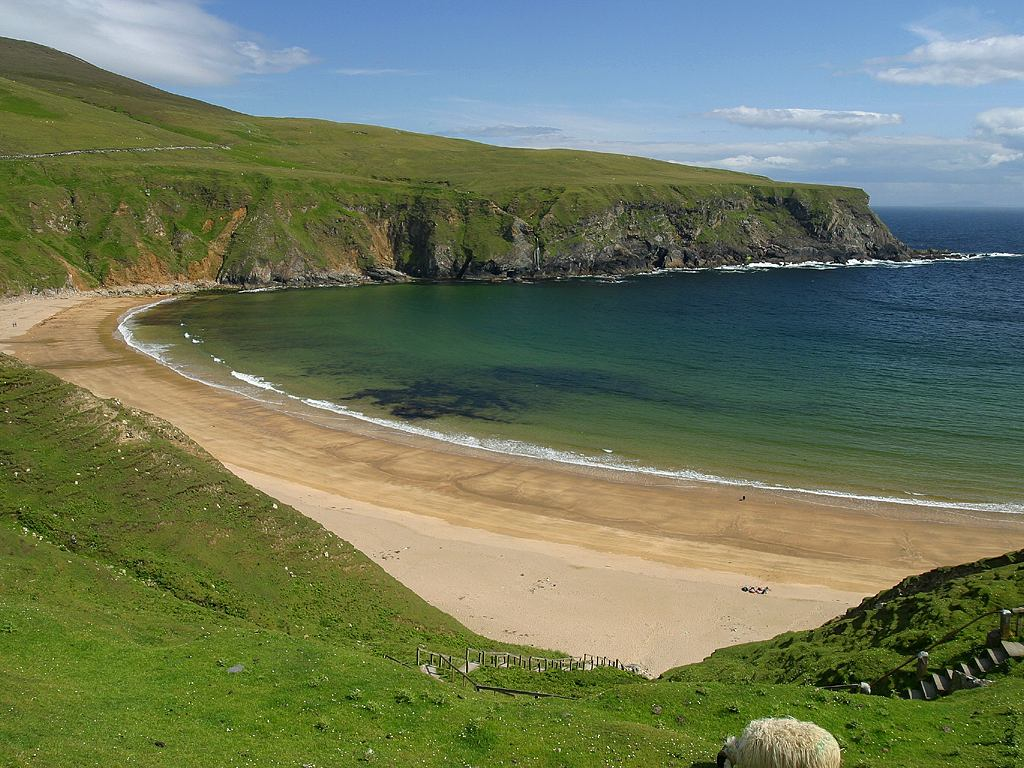
And another view
