= James McDyer =

Irish Catholic priest and campaigner (1910–1987)

James McDyer (1910–1987) was an Irish Catholic priest and campaigner for the rights of disadvantaged and underdeveloped rural areas of Ireland.

== Biography ==
McDyer was born, youngest of seven children, in Kilraine in Glenties, County Donegal, on 14 September 1910. He attended Glenties National School before going to St Eunan's College, Letterkenny. In 1930, he went on to St. Patrick's College, Maynooth to study for the priesthood. He was ordained on 20 June 1937. He served as a priest in London during the Blitz, in Wandsworth and in Kent, and back in Donegal on Tory Island from 1947.

In 1951, he was appointed to Glencolmcille in the Donegal Gaeltacht (Irish-speaking district), where he developed community facilities (at the time the area did not have electricity) and supported initiatives to stop the decline of the area, by developing local industries and the folk village and museum. He was a Canon of Church at the time of his retirement in 1986. He died in his sleep on 25 November 1987.
