= Malin Beg =

Village in County Donegal, Ireland

Malin Beg Málainn Bhig
- Village
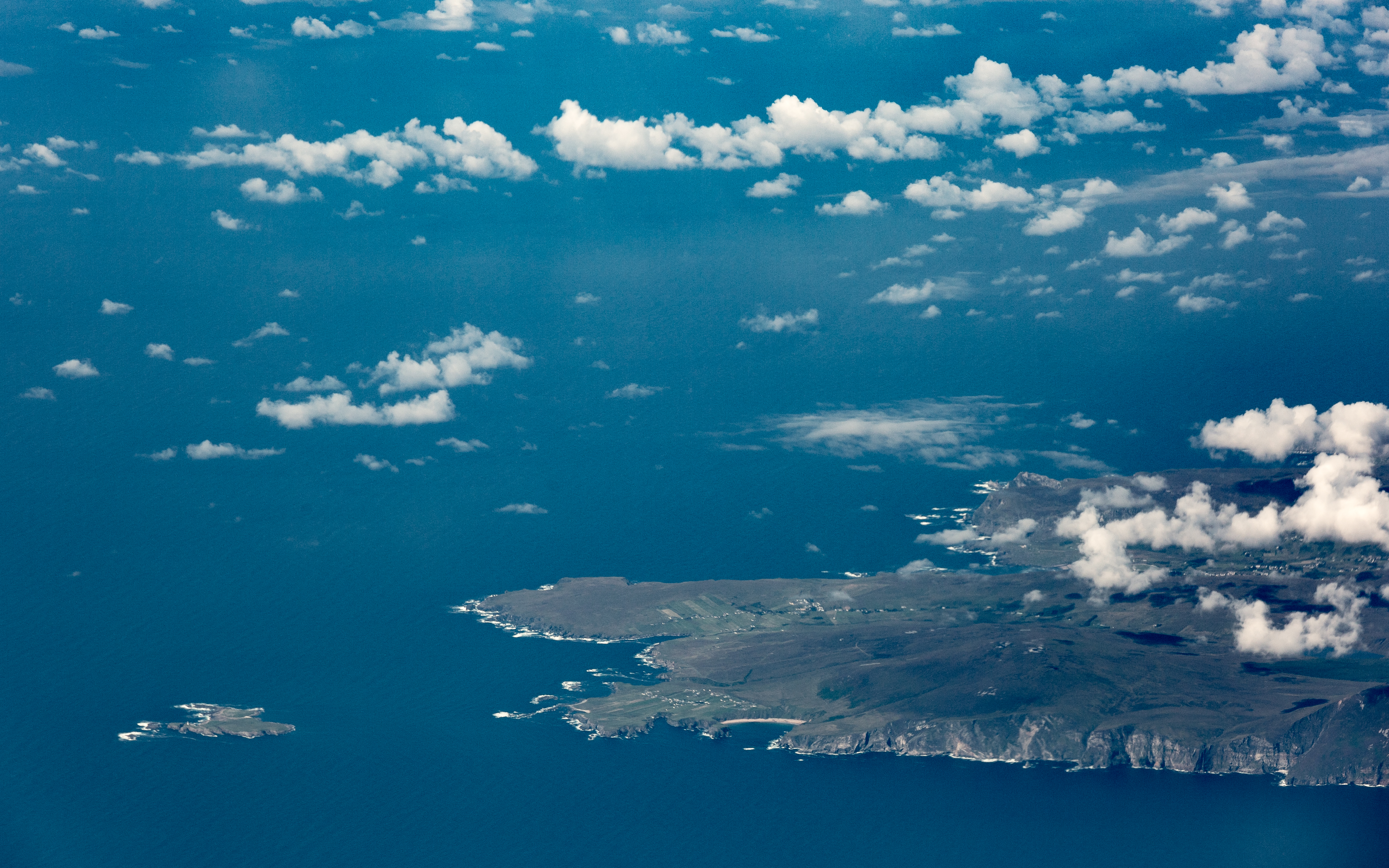
- The southwestern coastline of County Donegal with the Silver Strand and village of Malin Beg

- Location in Ireland
- Coordinates: 54°40′04″N 8°46′58″W
- Country: Ireland
- Province: Ulster
- County: County Donegal

Government
  - Dáil Éireann: Donegal

Population (2011)
  - Total: 365
- Time zone: UTC+0 (WET)
  - Summer (DST): UTC-1 (IST (WEST))
- Area code: 074

Malin Beg (Irish: Málainn Bhig) is a Gaeltacht village on the southwest coast of County Donegal in Ireland. It is noted for its beach, the Silver Strand.

== Demographics ==
Historical population

Year	Pop.	±%
1956	473	—
1961	445	−5.9%
1966	421	−5.4%
1971	431	+2.4%

Year	Pop.	±%
1979	457	+6.0%
1981	434	−5.0%
1986	434	+0.0%
1991	436	+0.5%

Year	Pop.	±%
1996	377	−13.5%
2002	390	+3.4%
2006	391	+0.3%
2011	365	−6.6%

Source: Central Statistics Office. "CNA18: Population by Sex, Gaeltacht Area and Year". CSO.ie.
