= Frosses =

Village in County Donegal, Ireland

Frosses Na Frosa
- Village
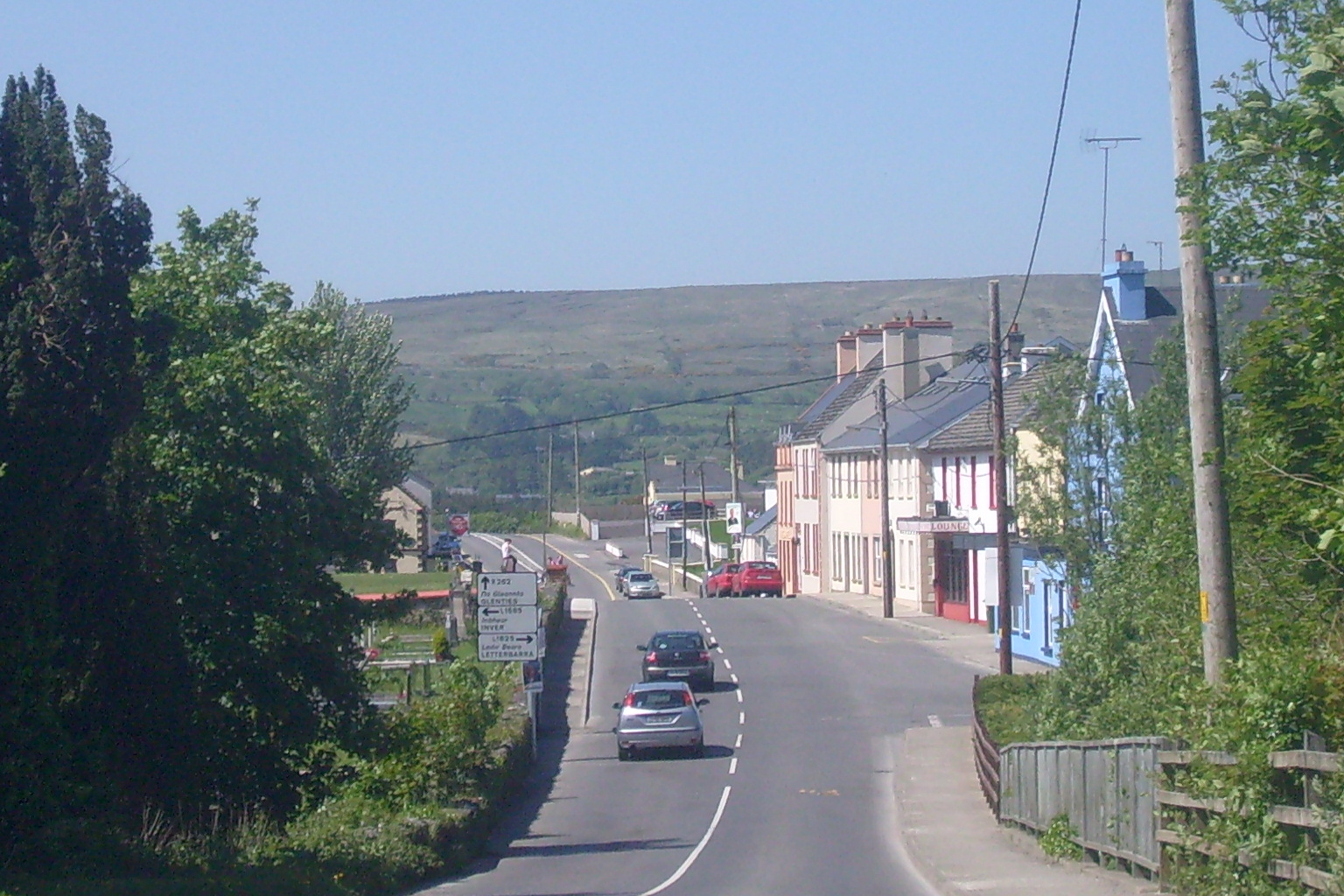
- The R262 road passes through Frosses

- Location in Ireland
- Coordinates: 54°40′07″N 8°14′36″W
- Country: Ireland
- Province: Ulster
- County: County Donegal

Government
  - Dáil Éireann: Donegal
- Time zone: UTC+0 (WET)
  - Summer (DST): UTC-1 (IST (WEST))

Frosses (Irish: Na Frosa) is a small village in County Donegal, Ireland. It is situated in the south of the county on the R262 regional road, 7 miles (11 km) west of Donegal Town. The local Catholic church is St. Mary's, located on the main street.

== History ==
The name of the village is said to come from the Irish for "showers", which refers to food that fell from the sky and saved locals during the famine. The first chapel in the village was reportedly built in 1780, and completed in 1808. The bell tower was added to the church in 1892.

== Amenities ==
The village contains a community hall, a Montessori, a primary school, hairdressers, beauticians, coffee stall, printing shop, basketball court and tennis court.

== Transport ==
The village is served by the 490 bus. It is also served by the TFI Local Link bus.

== Notable people ==
Mary Coughlan, former Tánaiste, has lived in Frosses.

== See also ==
- List of populated places in Ireland
