= Glencolmcille =

Village and parish in County Donegal, Ireland

Gleann Cholm Cille Glencolumbkille
- District and civil parish
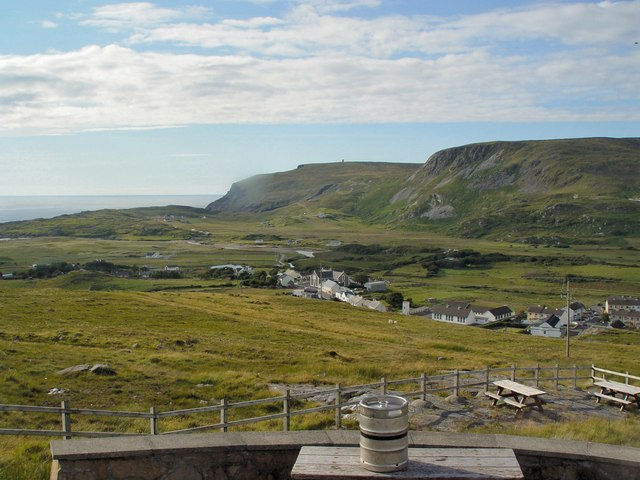
- View of Gleann Cholm Cille

- Location in Ireland
- Coordinates: 54°42′32″N 8°43′34″W
- Country: Ireland
- Province: Ulster
- County: County Donegal
- Barony: Banagh (Irish: Báinigh)
- Elevation: 20 m (66 ft)

Population (2022)
  - Total: 167
- Irish Grid Reference: G529846
- Gleann Cholm Cille is the official name. The anglicised spellings Glencolmcille and Glencolumbkille do not have official status.

Gleann Cholm Cille, known in English as Glencolmcille or Glencolumbkille, is a small district on the Atlantic coast of south-west County Donegal in Ulster, the northern province in Ireland. Named after Saint Colm Cille (Columba), it is also a civil parish in the historic barony of Banagh. Glencolmcille is in the Gaeltacht, and while it remains an Irish-speaking community, English has been steadily replacing Irish as the main language, with only 34% of residents speaking Irish on a daily basis in 2002. The village of Cashel is the main settlement in the district.

== History ==
The earliest recorded names for the district were Glend (meaning simply 'Glen' or 'Valley') and Senglenn (meaning 'Old Glen' or 'Old Valley'). The district later became known as Gleann Cholm Cille, probably in the fifteenth-century. This later, and current, name means 'Valley of Colm Cille'. The district's current name was first fully recorded only in 1532, when it was written in Maghnas Ó Domhnaill's Betha Colaim Chille (Life of Colm Cille) as being: ag tSenglenda a crich Ceneoil Conill ris a raiter Glend Colaim Cilli aniug ('at the river of Seanghleann [Old Glen] in the territory of the Cenél Conaill, which is called Gleann Cholm Cille today'). Saint Colm Cille, or Columba, is one of Ireland's three patron saints (along with Saint Patrick and Saint Brigid). He and his followers supposedly lived in the valley for a time and the ruins of several of their churches can still be seen there.

The district was once famous as being the parish of The V. Rev. James Canon McDyer (1910–1987), who championed the rights of rural people and helped establish community-based industries in the area. A parish council (Comhairle Paróiste Ghleann Cholm Cille) has been functioning in Glencolmcille since the 1930s, to look after the interests and needs of the residents. Members are elected to this body every four years by the residents of the Glencolmcille church area.

=== Historic sites ===
Four sites make up National Monument #139:

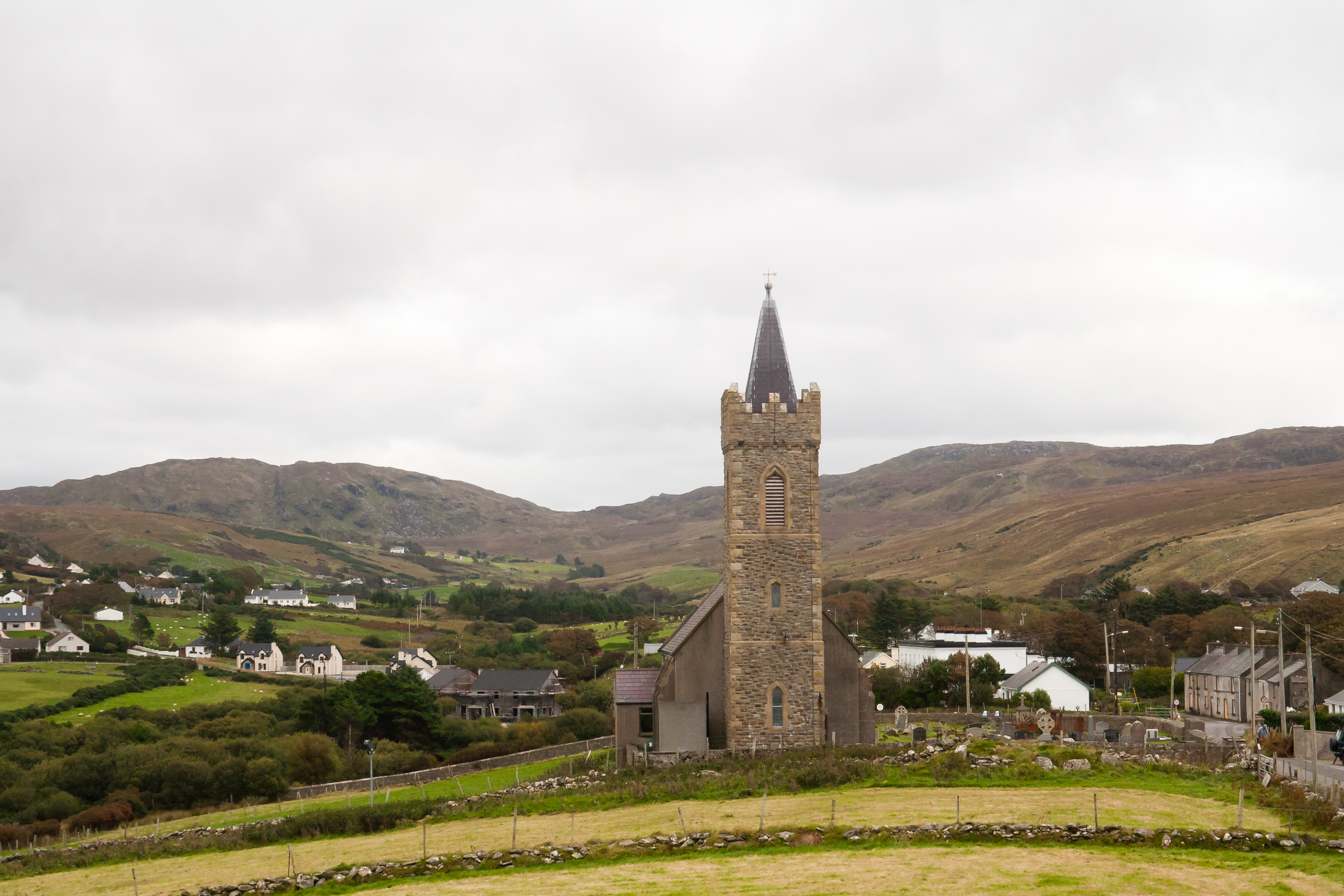
St. Columba's Church of Ireland Church

- Glencolumbkille Cashel (54.708756°N 8.722247°W) — A penitential station, also called Glencolumbkille Turas (Irish for "journey"). Every 9 June the local people go through 15 "stations." It begins at a court cairn, constructed 3000 BC. The pilgrim circles the cairn three times sunwise, while praying, places his/her back to the stone, then renounces the World, the Flesh, and the Devil.
- Glencolumbkille Church of Ireland Church (54.718464°N 8.736631°W) — A holy well is located in Beefan townland.
- Malin Beg (54.665009°N 8.770639°W) — Church of St Kevin and ringfort.
- Malin More (54.682566°N 8.720830°W) — A portal tomb dated to c. 2000 BC.

== Culture ==
Glencolmcille was home to the Dublin-born artist Kenneth King, whose works depict naval and merchant shipping, coastline and lighthouses. (Note: Some of Kenneth King's paintings are on display in the National Maritime Museum of Ireland in Dún Laoghaire)

British composer Sir Arnold Bax made many extended visits there between 1904 and the early 1930s. Apparently, Bax composed much of his music and wrote many of his poems and stories while staying there. He describes the district and its villages, and the life of its inhabitants, in his autobiography Farewell My Youth:

At one end of the little Glen Bay was a wilderness of tumbled black rocks, for some reason named Romantia (a particularly "gentle" – or fairy-haunted place, I was told in Dooey opposite), and upon this grim escarpment the breakers thundered and crashed, flinging up, as from a volcano, towering clouds of dazzling foam which would be hurled inland by the gale to put out the fires in the cottage hearths of Beefan and Garbhros. The savagery of the sea was at times nearly incredible. I have seen a continuous volume of foam sucked, as in a funnel, up the whole six-hundred-foot face of Glen Head, whilst with the wind north-west a like marvel would be visible on the opposite cliff.

There were days when you had to lean hard up against the wind to keep your feet at all... Yet in that unearthly valley there always seemed to be a core of peace in the heart of the most ravening tempest.

—Arnold Bax, Farewell My Youth

There are a number of natural sites nearby, such as the Slieve League (Sliabh Liag) cliffs, The Silver Strand (An Tráigh Bhán) at Malin Beg (Málainn Bhig), and Glen Head (Cionn Ghlinne) itself.

At the centre of one of the largest Gaeltacht areas, the district is known as the home of Oideas Gael, an Irish-language learning institute established in 1984 to promote the Irish language and culture. The district also has a petrol station, grocer, post office, folk village, woollen mill, hill walking and accommodation centre, restaurant, "village cafe" and two pubs (often with Irish fiddle music).

The village of Cashel is home to the Scoil an Chaisil, a Catholic co-educational primary school founded in 1962, in which all classes are taught through Irish.

Films shot on location in Glencolmcille include The Railway Station Man (1992), starring Julie Christie, Donald Sutherland and John Lynch, and In the Land of Saints and Sinners (2023), featuring Liam Neeson, Ciarán Hinds, Jack Gleeson and Kerry Condon.

== Notable people ==
- Sir Domhnall Ó Domhnaill (Sir Dónal O'Donnell; died September 1590), eldest son of Sir Aodh mac Maghnusa Ó Domhnaill (Sir Hugh McManus O'Donnell); Sir Domhnall was killed near Glencolmcille at the Battle of Doire Leathan, very near Teelin.
- Charles Inglis (1734–1816) - first Bishop of Nova Scotia, was the son of a Church of Ireland rector of Glencolmcille.
- James Canon McDyer (1910–1987) - born in Glenties close to Glencolmcille.
- Patrick (Sonny) McGinley (born 1937) - novelist
- John Joe Doherty (born 1968) - Gaelic footballer
- Noel Hegarty, Gaelic footballer

== Gallery ==
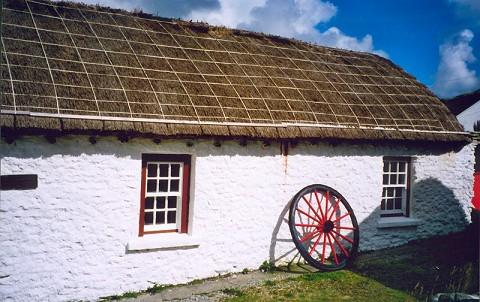
Typical local cottage at the Folk Village Museum.

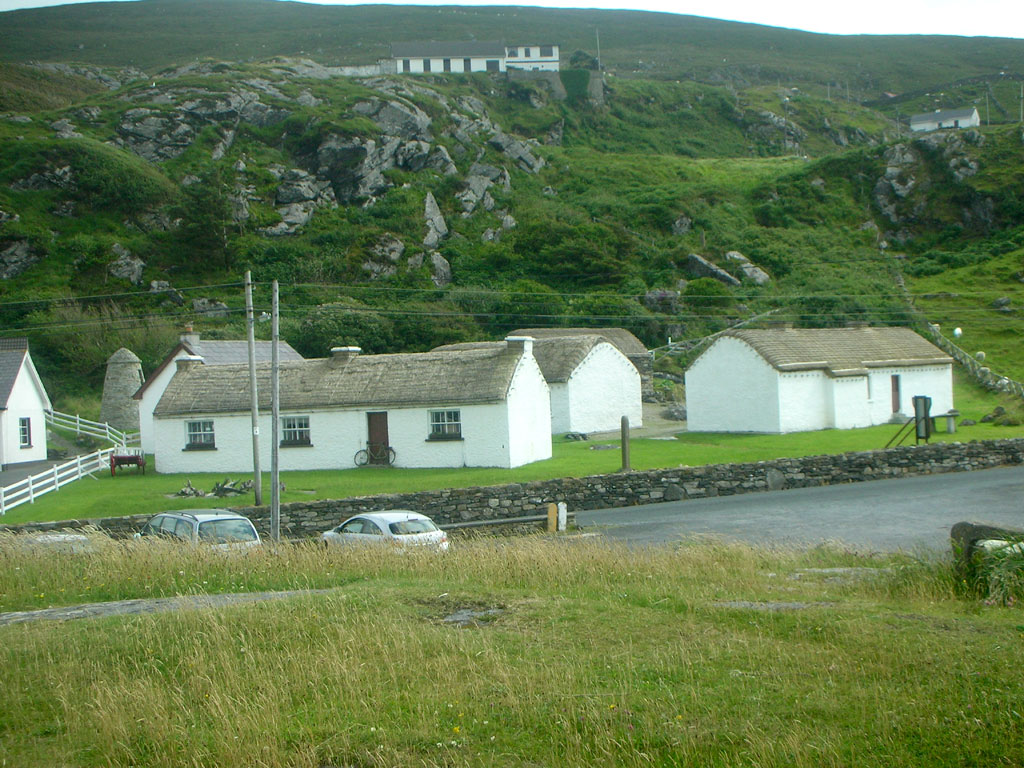
Folk Village Museum historical cottages.

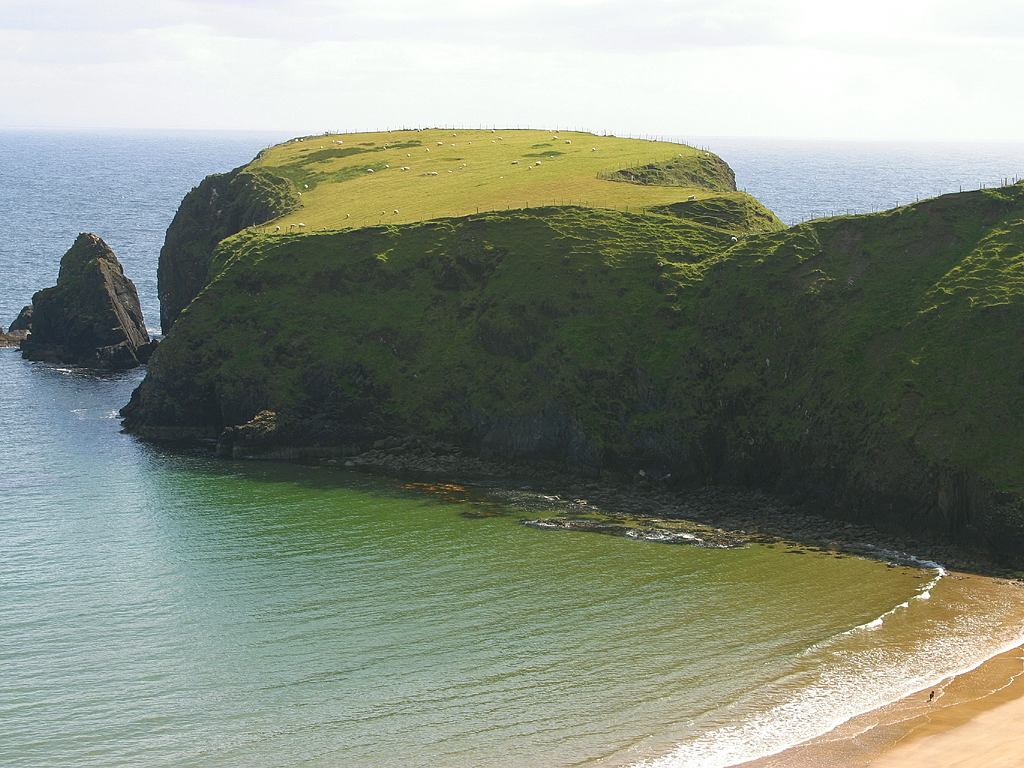
Trabane Strand.
