= Mountcharles =

Village in County Donegal, Ireland

Mountcharles Irish: Tamhnach an tSalainn
- Village
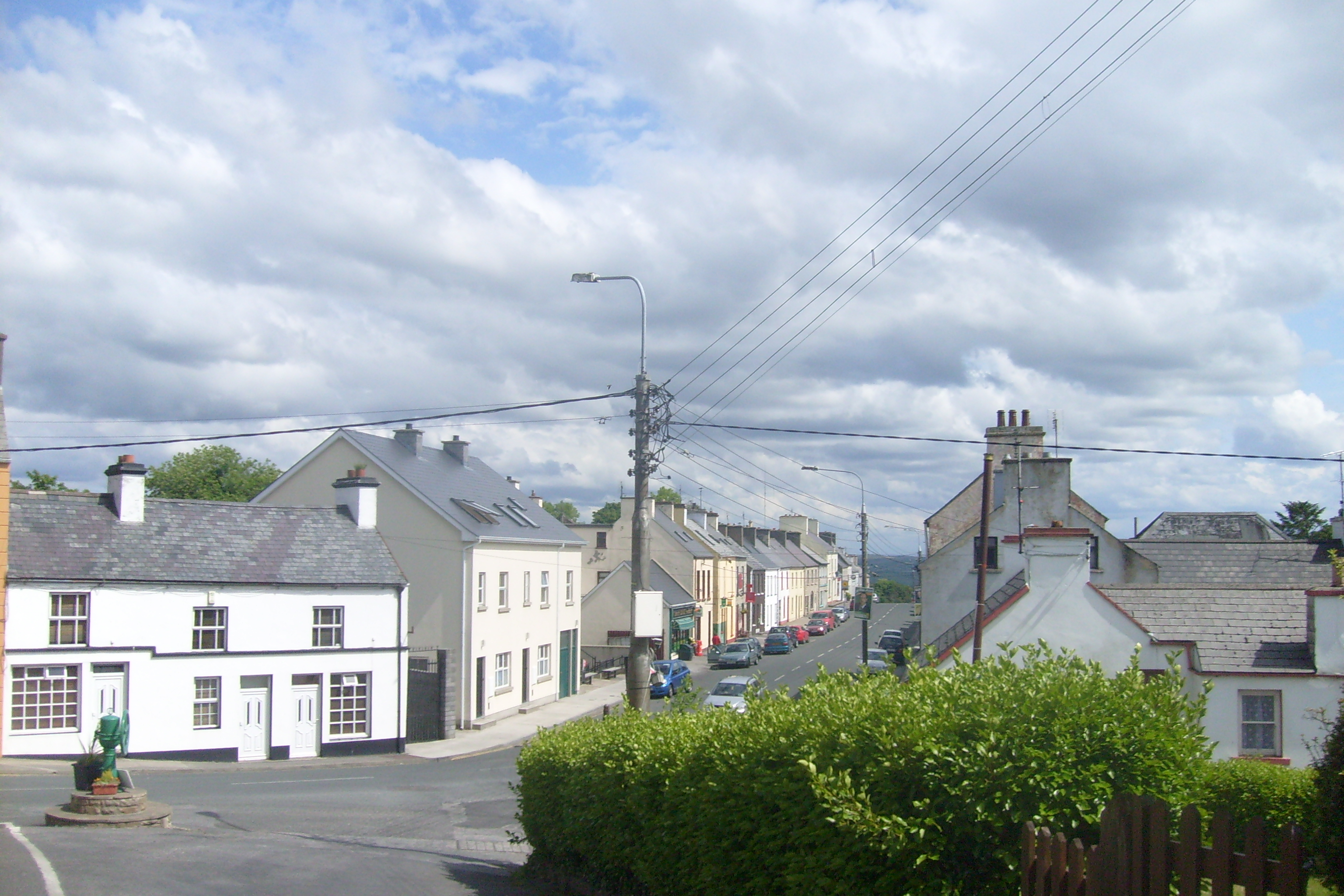
- Lower Main Street in Mountcharles

- Location in Ireland
- Coordinates: 54°39′N 8°12′W
- Country: Ireland
- Province: Ulster
- County: County Donegal
- Barony: Banagh

Government
  - Dáil constituency: Donegal

Population (2022)
  - Total: 652

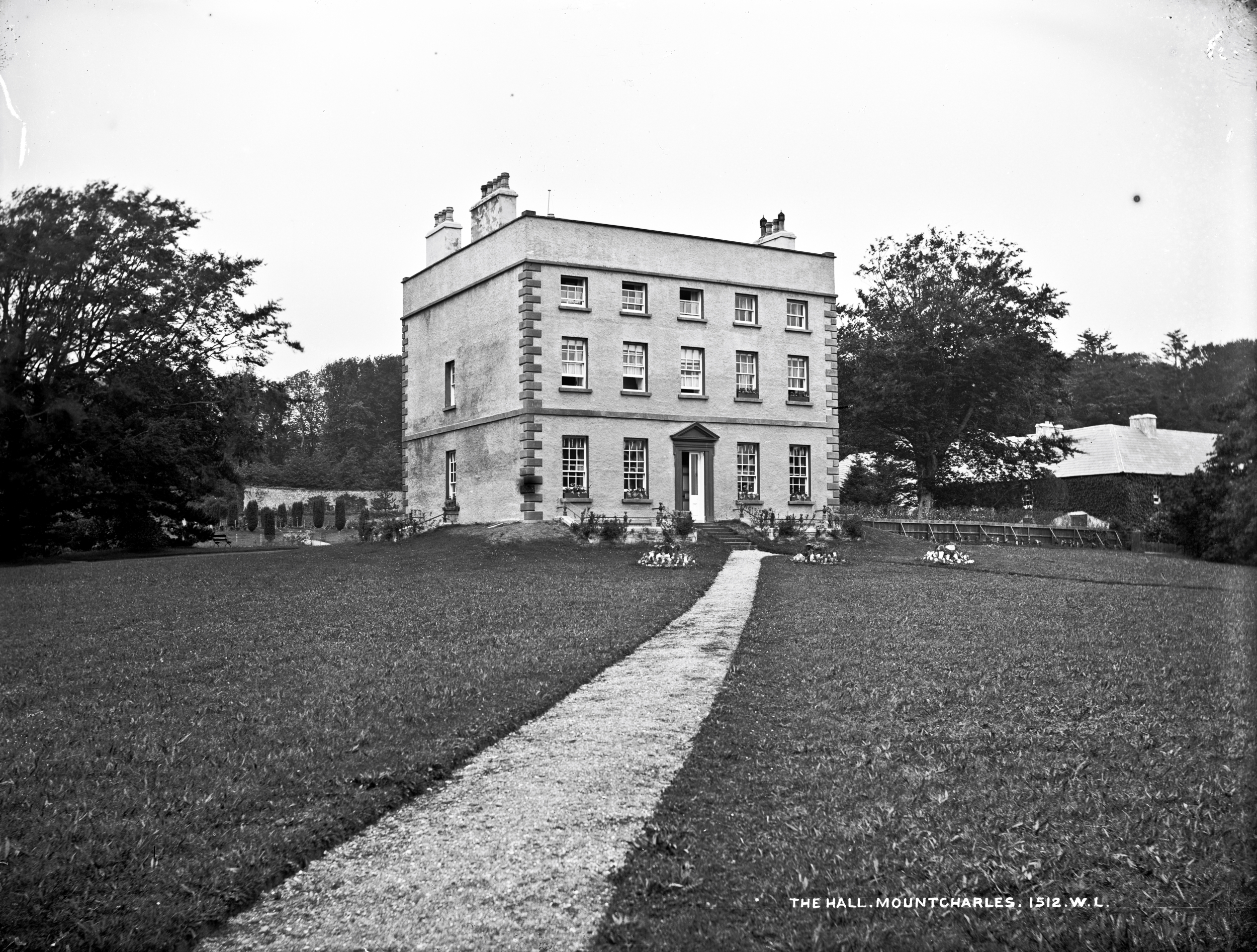
The Hall, Mountcharles, circa 1900.

Mountcharles (Irish: Tamhnach an tSalainn) is a village and townland (of 650 acres) in the south of County Donegal in Ulster, the northern province in Ireland. It lies 6 km from Donegal town on the Killybegs road (N56). It is situated in the civil parish of Inver and the historic barony of Banagh. The village's name is usually pronounced locally as 'Mount-char-liss'.

== Name ==
Before the Plantation of Ulster, the area from the present N56 to the sea, including modern day Salthill, was known as Tamhnach an tSalainn ('the Field of Salt'). This refers to the fields along the coast which flooded with seawater with the flow of the tide; as the water receded, salt remnants remained in the fields.

The Irish name for the village refers to this salt mine in the area which local people worked in, and at a growing rate, as the salt extraction rate was increased by the plantation founder, Charles Conyngham. The name was later anglicized as Tawnaghtallan and Tawnytallan.

Whereupon English became the only language permitted for placenames under the Penal laws in Ireland, the Cistercian Grange in the area was known as the Grange of Tawnytallon, which led to the area being anglicised as Tawnaghtallan and Tawnytallan.

The English name for the village owes its origin to the Scottish plantation 'undertaker', Charles Conyngham, who arrived in County Donegal during the Plantation of Ulster and asserted a landlord control over the area, renaming the region Mount Charles after himself. By controlling the sale of salt from the region, Charles Conyngham then financed the building of the few surviving buildings in the village in the 17th century.

The Conyngham estate and its large estate house (Hall Demesne), close to the village is still extant and was originally constructed around 1752-53 in a then fashionable Georgian style around the same time as Francis Conyngham, 2nd Baron Conyngham was raised to the peerage.

Alternatively, the origin of the modern name, Mountcharles, is from the 1660s. Albert Conyngham, son of Rev. Alexander Conyngham (Dean of Raphoe), was knighted by Charles II in 1666, and, in honour of the king, the plantation founders, the Conynghams enforced the name change to Mountcharles.

== History ==
In 1611, at the start of the Plantation of Ulster, Alexander Conyngham, first Church of Ireland Rector of Inver and Killymard, took ownership over the area, designating the area near the present Hall House as his own.

The village of Mountcharles was controlled by the Conyngham family thereafter. In 1676 Mountcharles was granted the sole right to hold markets and fairs: "Mountcharles, alias Tounytallon, a Friday market and four fairs on the 19th May, 11th September, 11th November and 17th March. Pursuant to patent signed and dated at Whitehall 9th December 1675 – granted to Sir Albert Conyngham, Kt. – July 27th 1676". The courtesy title of the heir apparent of The Marquess Conyngham is Earl of Mount Charles, and is named after the village. The descendants of Conyngham were later resident in Slane Castle, County Meath.

Arthur Young, noted agriculturist and social and political observer, mentioned visiting Mountcharles in his book A Tour of Ireland (1776–1779).

=== Pre-Famine Mountcharles ===
The early houses were built with stone, which was quarried near St Peter's Lough and at the quarries behind the town. The early houses were thatched. According to both the 1841 census and Samuel Lewis's 1837 Topographical Dictionary of Ireland, Mountcharles was the only town in the parish pre-Famine times.

=== Hall Demesne ===
The former country house of the Conyngham family, The Hall, is near the village. From the beginning of the 18th century, the Conynghams no longer regarded Mountcharles as their principal seat, but Slane. It was sold by the 6th Marquess Conyngham (1890–1974) immediately in 1946, to pay for the installation of electricity in Slane Castle.

== Administration ==
Mountcharles gave its name to the district electoral division (DED) of Mountcharles from 1850. By 1940, this DED had been renamed as Tantallon. For elections to Donegal County Council, it is part of the local electoral area and municipal district of Donegal. Mountcharles is part of the five-seat Donegal constituency.

== Transport ==
Mountcharles railway station was on a branch line of the County Donegal Railways Joint Committee, a narrow gauge railway system. It was opened on 18 August 1893 and shut on 1 January 1960.

== Amenities ==
The village has one general shop on the Main Street. A fishmongers, a local butchers, a post office, a pharmacy and local tea rooms. The area also hosts a pilates and yoga centre as well as a massage therapist, a beautician, several hairdressers and a barber shop. There are two bars on the main street.

== Sport ==
The village has a Gaelic games pitch that belongs to the local club St Naul's (Irish: Naomh Naile) and a nearby football club, Eany Celtic F.C. In 2013, the Mountcharles Rowing Club was established.

== Notable people ==
- Cahir Healy, politician
- Seumas MacManus, author, dramatist and poet
- Stephen Joseph McGroarty, Irish-born American soldier

== See also ==
- List of urban areas in Ireland
