= Ardara, County Donegal =

Town in County Donegal, Ireland

Ardara Ard an Rátha
- Town
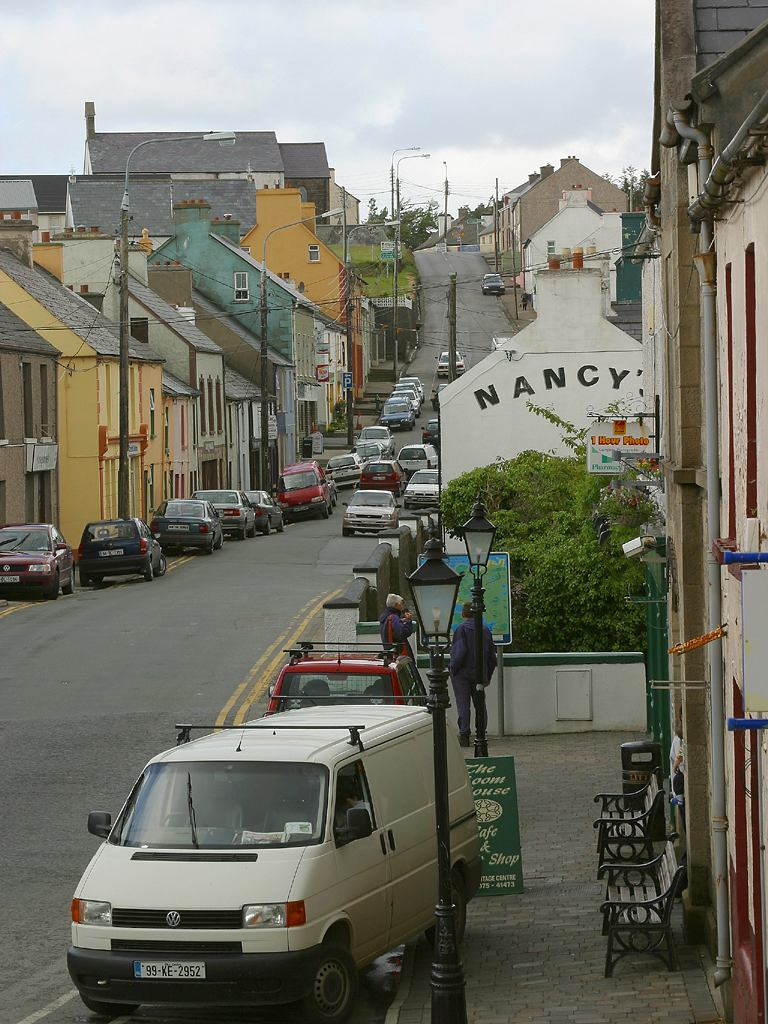
- Front Street

- Location in Ireland
- Coordinates: 54°46′00″N 8°24′00″W
- Country: Ireland
- Province: Ulster
- County: County Donegal
- Barony: Banagh (Irish: Báinigh)

Government
  - Dáil Éireann: Donegal
- Elevation: 45 m (148 ft)

Population (2022)
  - Total: 785
- Irish Grid Reference: G731906
- Website: www.ardara.ie

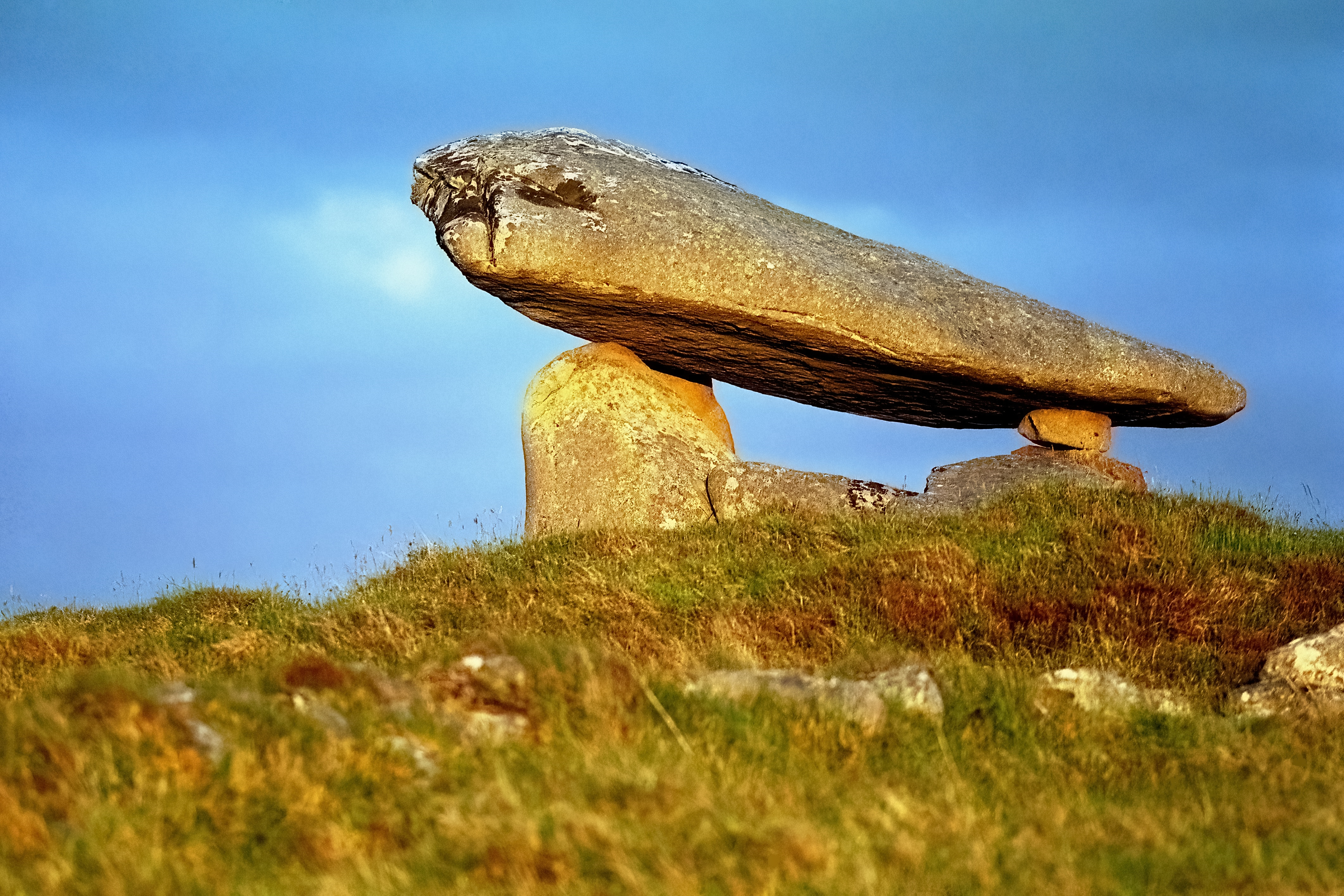
Kilclooney Dolmen near Ardara

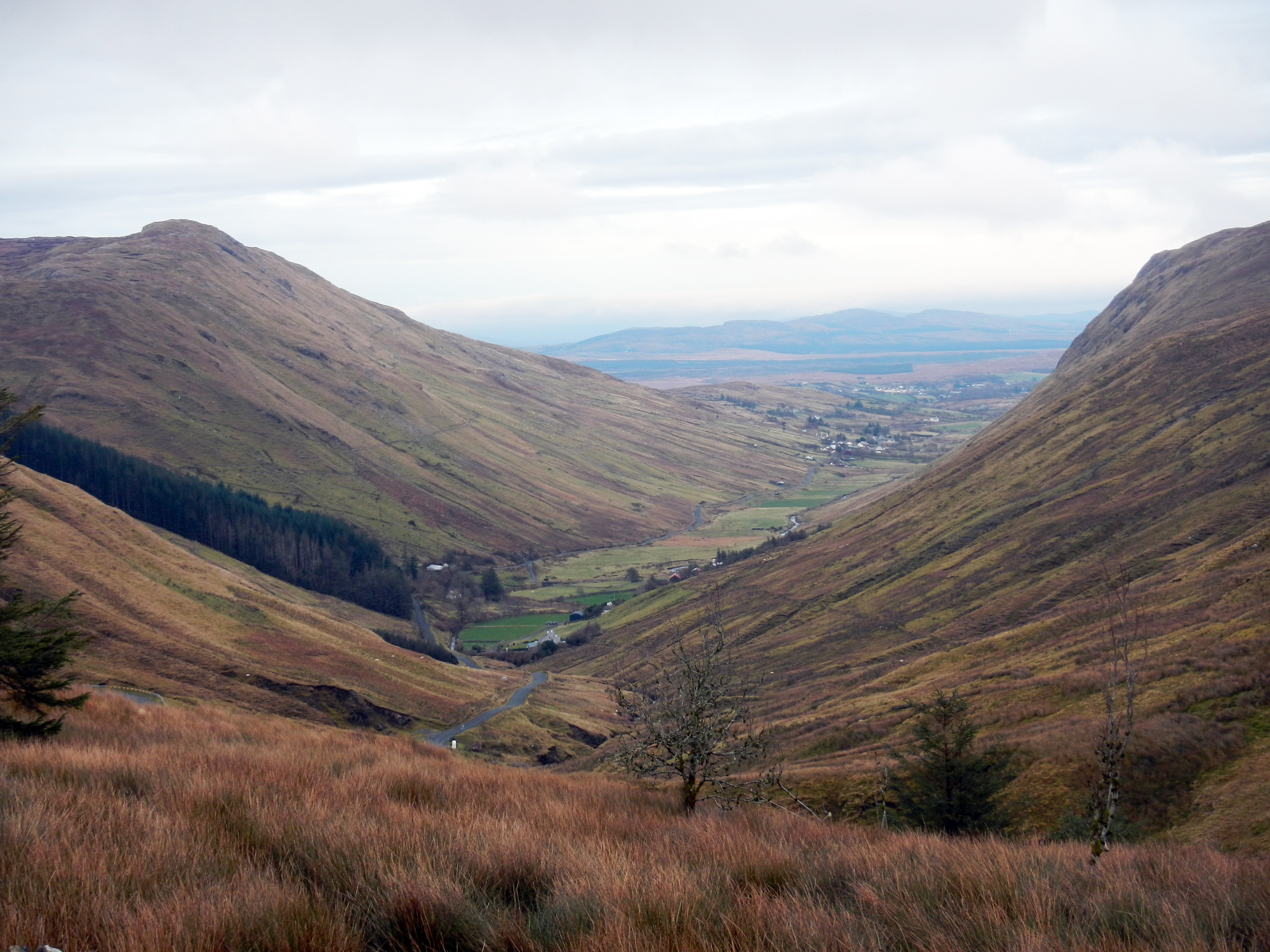
Glengesh Pass looking north-east to Ardara

Ardara (English: /ɑːrˈdrɑː/ ar-DRAH; Irish: Ard an Rátha, meaning 'height of the fort') is a small town in the south-west of County Donegal, Ireland. It is about 25 km (16 mi) north-west of Donegal Town, on the N56 and R261 roads. The population at the 2022 census was 785. The 2011 population of 731 represented an increase of about 30% since 2006. In 2012, The Irish Times named it the best village in which to live in Ireland.

Ardara (pronounced as Arr-drahh) is one of County Donegal's five designated heritage towns. The town is near the Owenea River (pronounced Owen-ee-ahh), a 'burn' known for salmon and trout fishing. Just beyond Ardara lies the Glengesh Pass, a scenic route leading to Glencolmcille.

== History ==
The Donegal County Directory for 1862 shows the administrative positions that were held in the county in that year, including several in Ardara. There is a photograph of Brendan Behan in Ardara with a glass of tomato juice while visiting Gildea's (now The Beehive) in 1960.

The town's name derives from an ancient earthen ring-fort that sits atop a hill northeast of the town. Christianity was introduced to Ardara in the 6th century by Saint Conall Caol, a direct descendant of Saint Colmcille. From the mid-17th to the late 19th century, the Nesbitt family of Woodhill played a significant role in Ardara's commercial development.

Ardara (pronounced as Arr-drahh) has a long-standing association with the tweed and knitwear industries. Since the 1870s, this trade has been a cottage industry, with locals producing hand-spun and hand-dyed woollen and tweed garments. The Ardara Heritage Centre, formerly the town's courthouse, provides insights into the evolution of the tweed industry. Today, several shops in Ardara continue to sell local tweed and knitwear.

Stained-glass artist Evie Hone's 'Rose Window' can be seen in the Church of the Holy Family (known locally as 'the Chapel'), the Catholic church in Ardara.

== Outdoor activities ==
The Owenea River has salmon and trout fishing. There is pony trekking and surfing on local beaches. The nearby Narin and Portnoo links offers golfing.

== Festivals ==
Ardara's numerous festivals include the Cupan Tae Festival, Johnny Doherty Festival, Bluegrass Festival, Matchmaking Festival, Wild Atlantic Festival, Country & Western Festival, Walking Festival, Ardara Show Day and Melting Pot Festival.

== Notable people ==
- Bibi Baskin, television personality
- Damian Diver, Gaelic footballer
- John Doherty, musician
- Senator Eileen Flynn, politician and Traveller activist from Ballyfermot in Dublin who now lives in Ardara
- Martin Gavigan, Gaelic footballer
- Paddy McGrath, Gaelic footballer
- Anthony Molloy, captained Donegal in their first All-Ireland Senior Football Championship title-winning season in 1992
- Pat Shovelin, Donegal goalkeeping coach in their second All-Ireland Senior Football Championship title-winning season in 2012

== See also ==
- List of populated places in the Republic of Ireland
- Market Houses in the Republic of Ireland
