= Dunkineely =

Village in County Donegal, Ireland

Dunkineely Dún Cionnaola
- Village
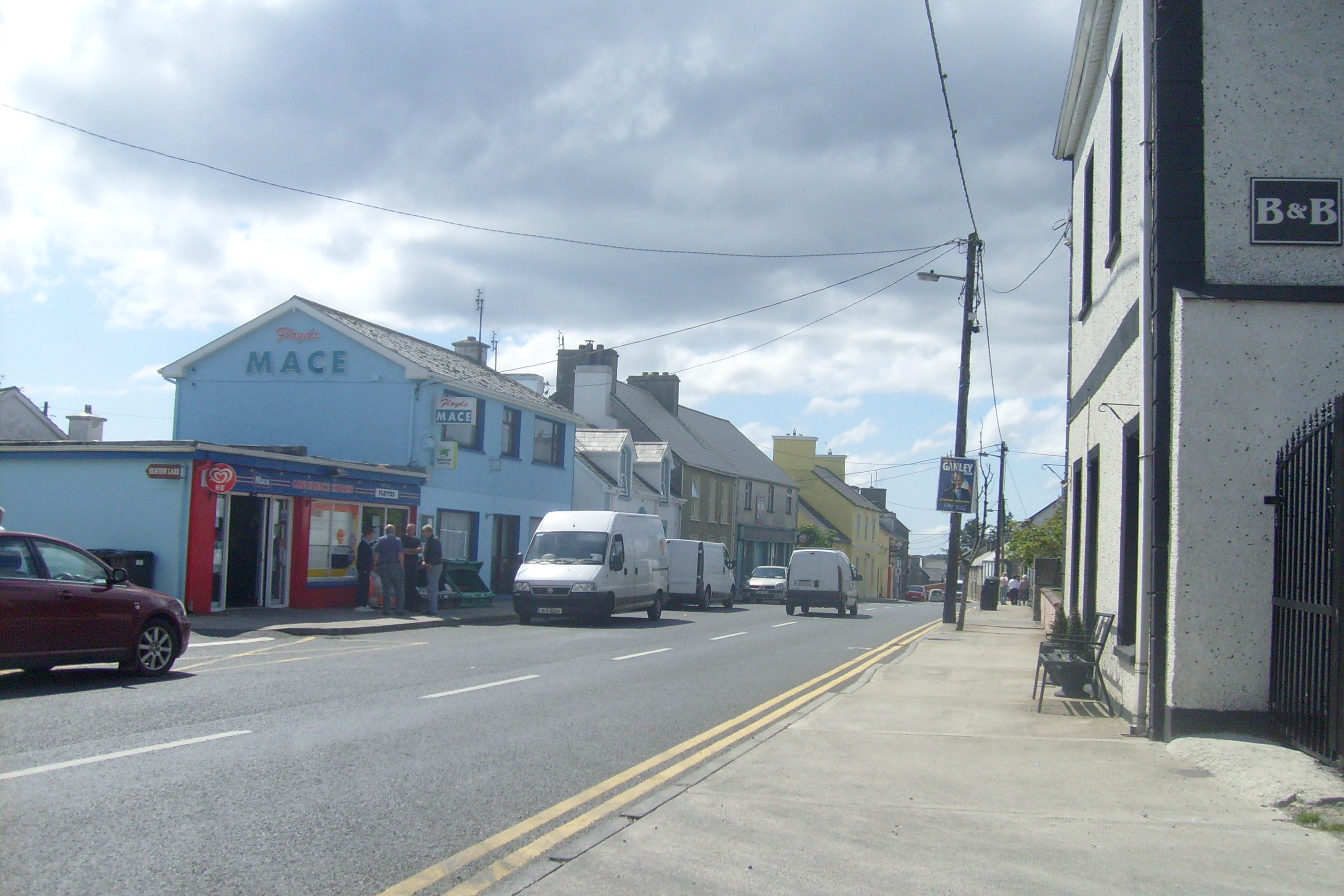

- Location in Ireland
- Coordinates: 54°37.919′N 8°21.641′W
- Country: Ireland
- Province: Ulster
- County: County Donegal

Government
  - Dáil Éireann: Donegal
  - EU Parliament: Midlands–North-West
- Elevation: 150 m (490 ft)

Population (2022)
  - Total: 352
- Time zone: UTC+0 (WET)
  - Summer (DST): UTC-1 (IST (WEST))
- Area code: 074, +000 353 74
- Irish Grid Reference: G711767
- Website: www.dunkineelytown.com

Dunkineely (Irish: Dún Cionnaola, meaning 'Kinealy's fort') is a small village and townland in County Donegal, Ireland. It is situated 11 miles (18 km) from the town of Donegal and 6 mi (10 km) from Killybegs on the N56 National secondary road. It is a small single street village with a population of around 350. There is a dun on the edge of the village from which Dunkineely derives its name. The village lies at the top of St John's Point, a narrow peninsula jutting seven miles into Donegal Bay.

Dunkineely lies at approximately 150 m (500 ft) above sea level. It is the larger of two villages in the parish of Killaghtee, the other being Bruckless, now the location of the Roman Catholic parish church. Nearby is the ancient parish church of Killaghtee. In the old graveyard there is one of the oldest Celtic crosses in Ireland, the Killaghtee Cross. The cross has carvings on its west side with a Maltese cross, two concentric circles and a threefold knot (Triquetra) which is thought to represent the Trinity.

The population is a mix of Roman Catholic and Protestant (Methodist and Church of Ireland). Employment in the area relies on seasonal fishing and mixed agriculture as well as service and light industry in the nearby towns of Killybegs and Donegal town.

== Facilities ==
The town has two local industries in the village that comprises a fish processing factory and architectural design and fabrication factory. Services in Dunkineely include a shop, cafe, car dealership, a fishing tackle shop/florist, a barber shop, auctioneers, 3 bars, a radio communications shop and a budget accommodation hostel. There are also several B&B's in the locality. There is also a national school, community centre, GAA pitch and soccer pitch.

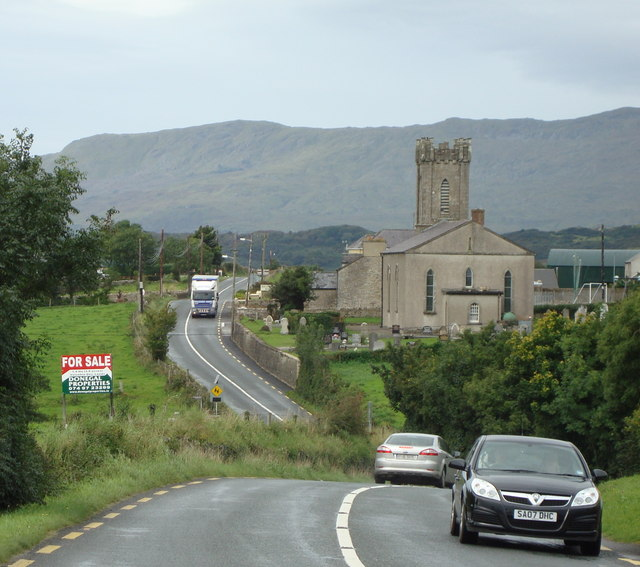
Church at Beaugreen Glebe

== Sport ==
The local Gaelic Athletic Association club is named Naomh Ultan. The local football team is Dunkineely Celtic.

== Transport ==
Dunkineely railway station opened on 18 August 1893, and closed on 1 January 1960. Dunkineely lies on the main N56 road between Donegal Town and Killybegs. A regular bus service operates along this route.

== Festival ==
Every year in the month of July or August the town hosts a 3-day weekend Summer Street Festival. Events over the years have included a parade through the town, soap box derby races, live bands, pub quizzes, sporting competitions, classic car show, wheelie bin races and digger and tractor driving competitions.

== Famous people ==
- Brian Goold-Verschoyle (1912-1942) - spy for the Soviet Union and victim of Joseph Stalin's Gulag. One of three Irish people to lose their lives as part of the Great Purge.
- Joseph Brennan (1912-1980) - former TD and Ceann Comhairle

== See also ==
- List of populated places in Ireland
