= Stranorlar railway station =

Former railway station in Ireland

Coordinates: 54.8014°N 7.7740°W

Stranorlar Srath an Urláir
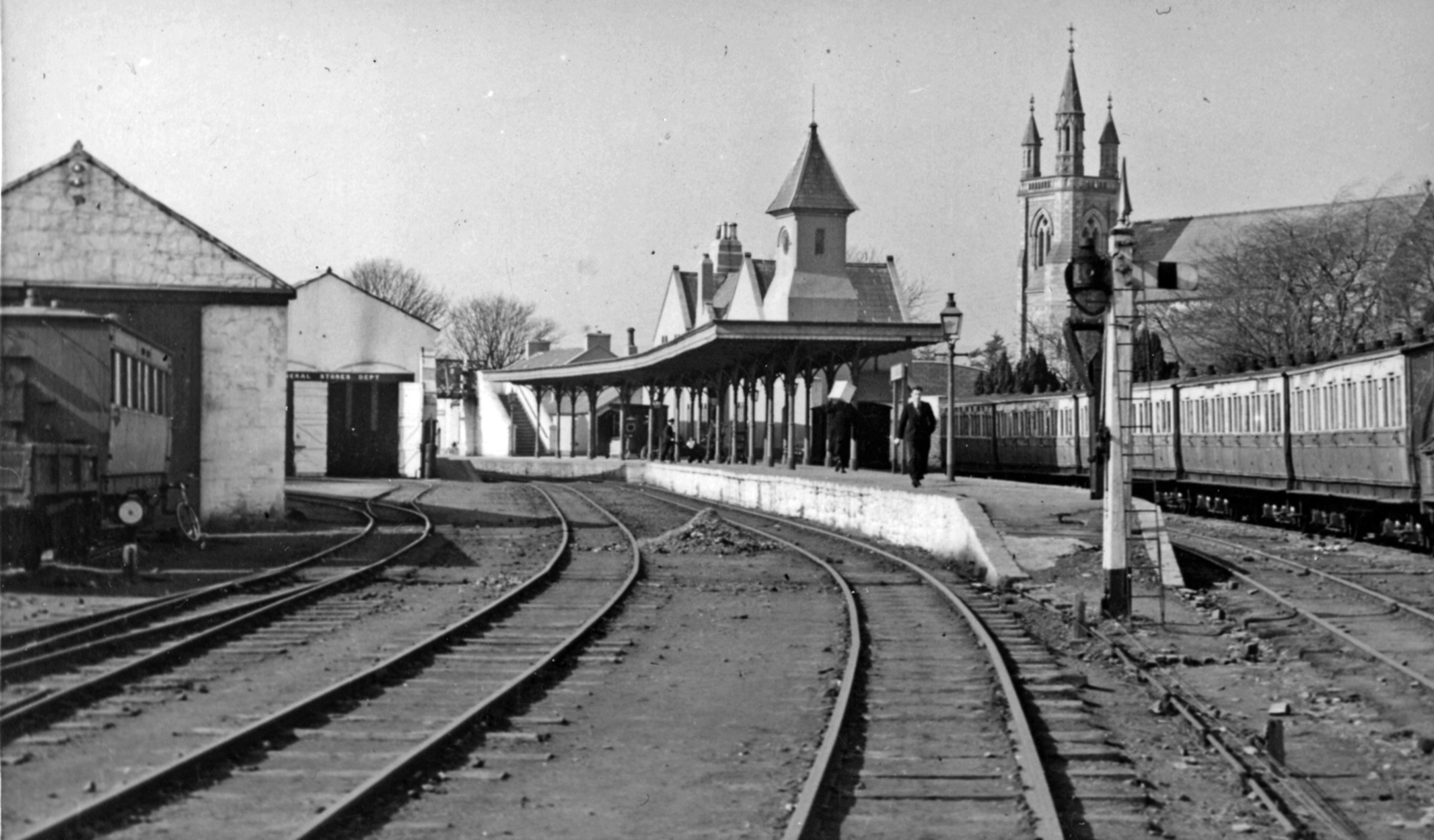
- 27 March 1948

General information
- Location: Stranorlar, County Donegal; Ireland

History
- Opened: 3 September 1863
- Closed: 6 February 1960
- Post-grouping: Finn Valley Railway

Services
Preceding station	Disused railways	Following station
Town Bridge Halt	Finn Valley Railway; Strabane to Stranorlar	Terminus
Terminus	West Donegal Railway; Stranorlar to Druminin	Meenglas Halt
Ballybofey	Donegal Railway Company; Glenties to Stranorlar	Terminus
Location

Stranorlar railway station served the village of Stranorlar in County Donegal, Ireland.

The station opened on 3 September 1863 on the Finn Valley Railway line from Strabane to Stranorlar.

One of the first acts of the new Donegal Railway Company was to convert the former Finn Valley Railway from Strabane to Stranorlar from 5 ft 3 in (1,600 mm) to 3 ft (914 mm) gauge, which it completed on 16 July 1894.

The later railway extensions to Donegal by the West Donegal Railway and via Fintown railway station to Glenties by the Donegal Railway Company.

Stranorlar became the headquarters of the successor company, the County Donegal Railways Joint Committee.

It closed to passenger services on 31 December 1959. Goods trains continued to run between Stranorlar and Strabane until 6 February 1960
