= Clady railway station =

Railway station in Ireland

Clady

General information
- Location: County Donegal; Ireland

History
- Original company: Finn Valley Railway
- Post-grouping: County Donegal Railways Joint Committee

Key dates
- 7 September 1863: Station opens
- 1 January 1960: Station closes
Location

Clady railway station in County Donegal, Republic of Ireland served the village of Clady, County Tyrone in the United Kingdom.

The station opened on 7 September 1863 on the Finn Valley Railway line from Strabane to Stranorlar.

It closed on 1 January 1960.

== Routes ==
Preceding station	Disused railways	Following station
Strabane (GNI)	Finn Valley Railway; Strabane to Stranorlar 1863-1894	Castlefinn
Strabane (CDR)	Donegal Railway Company; Strabane to Stranorlar 1894-1960	Castlefinn
