= Ballindoon Bridge railway station =

Former railway station in Ireland

Ballindoon Bridge

General information
- Location: County Donegal; Ireland
- Coordinates: 54.80146°N 7.8027°W
- Elevation: 80 ft (24 m)
- Tracks: 1

Construction
- Structure type: Halt

History
- Opened: 1 August 1944
- Closed: 15 December 1947
- Original company: Donegal Railway Company

Services
Preceding station	Donegal Railway Company	Following station
Glenmore	Glenties to Stranorlar	Ballybofey
Location

Ballindoon Bridge halt was a railcar request stop which served the area of Cappry in County Donegal, Ireland.

The halt opened on 1 August 1944 on the Donegal Railway Company line from Glenties to Stranorlar.

It closed on 15 December 1947 when the County Donegal Railways Joint Committee closed the line from Glenties to Stranorlar in an effort to save money.

Freight services on the route continued until 10 March 1952.
