= Castlefinn railway station =

Railway station in County Donegal, Ireland

Coordinates: 54.8004°N 7.5934°W

Castlefinn

General information
- Location: County Donegal; Ireland

History
- Original company: Finn Valley Railway
- Post-grouping: County Donegal Railways Joint Committee

Key dates
- 7 September 1863: Station opens
- 1 January 1960: Station closes
Location
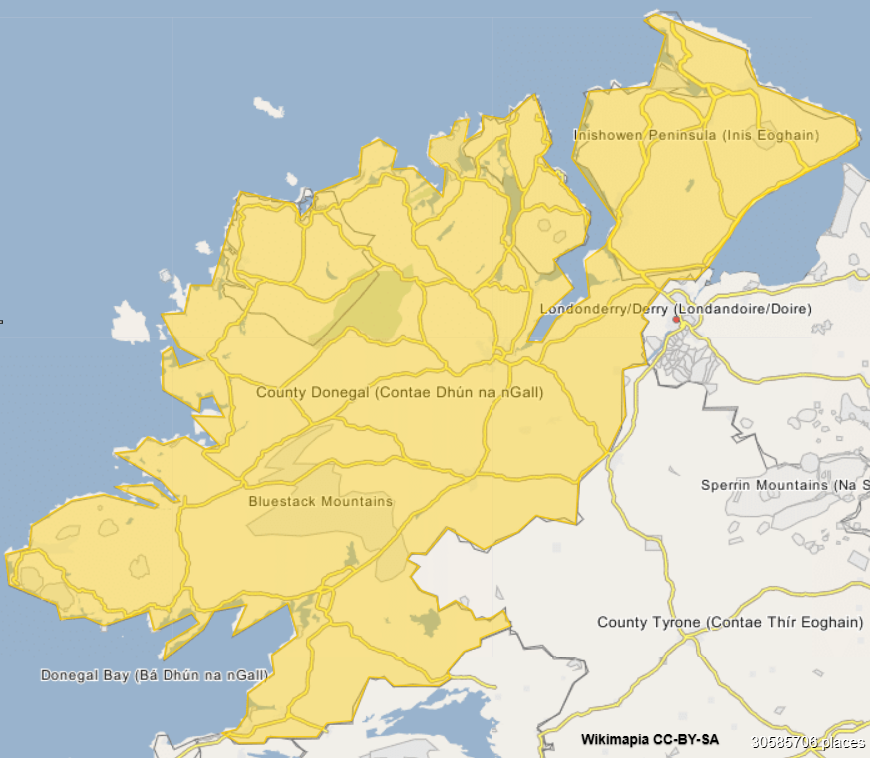
- Location within County Donegal Location within Ireland

Castlefinn railway station served the village of Castlefin in County Donegal, Ireland.

The station opened on 7 September 1863 on the Finn Valley Railway line from Strabane to Stranorlar.

It closed on 1 January 1960.

== Routes ==
| Preceding station | Disused railways | Following station |
|---|---|---|
| Clady | Finn Valley Railway; Strabane to Stranorlar | Liscooly |
