= Barnesmore Halt railway station =

Railway station in Ireland

Barnesmore Halt

General information
- Location: Barnesmore, County Donegal; Ireland
- Coordinates: 54.7°N 7.98°W

History
- Original company: West Donegal Railway
- Post-grouping: County Donegal Railways Joint Committee

Key dates
- 1 July 1891: Station opens as Barrack Bridge
- 1 September 1893: Station renamed as Barnesmore Halt
- 1 January 1960: Station closes
Location

Barnesmore Halt railway station served Barnesmore in County Donegal, Ireland.

The station opened as Barrack Bridge on 1 July 1891 on the West Donegal Railway line from Stranorlar to Donegal. It was renamed Barnesmore Halt on 1 September 1893.

It closed on 1 January 1960.

== Routes ==
Preceding station	Disused railways	Following station
Derg Bridge Halt	West Donegal Railway; Stranorlar to Donegal	Lough Eske
