= Killygordon railway station =

Railway station in Ireland

Killygordon
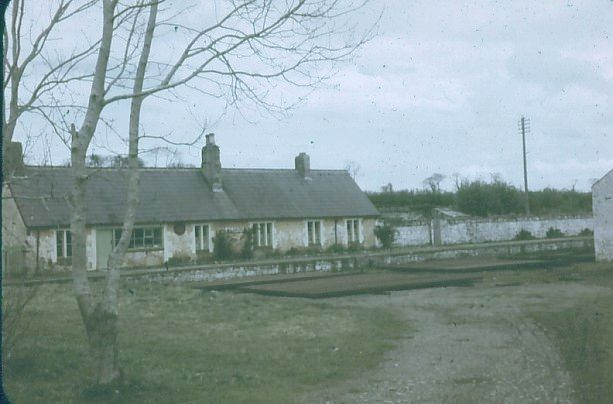
- Killygordon railway station in 1961

General information
- Location: County Donegal, Ulster, Ireland
- Coordinates: 54.795064°N 7.684029°W

History
- Original company: Finn Valley Railway
- Post-grouping: County Donegal Railways Joint Committee

Key dates
- 7 September 1863: Station opens
- 1 January 1960: Station closes
Location

Killygordon railway station served the village of Killygordon in County Donegal in Ulster, Ireland.

The station opened on 7 September 1863 on the Finn Valley Railway line from Strabane to Stranorlar.

It closed on 1 January 1960.

== Routes ==
Preceding station	Disused railways	Following station
Liscooly	Finn Valley Railway; Strabane to Stranorlar	Cavan Halt
