= Ballybofey railway station =

Former station in County Donegal, Ireland

Ballybofey Bealach Féich
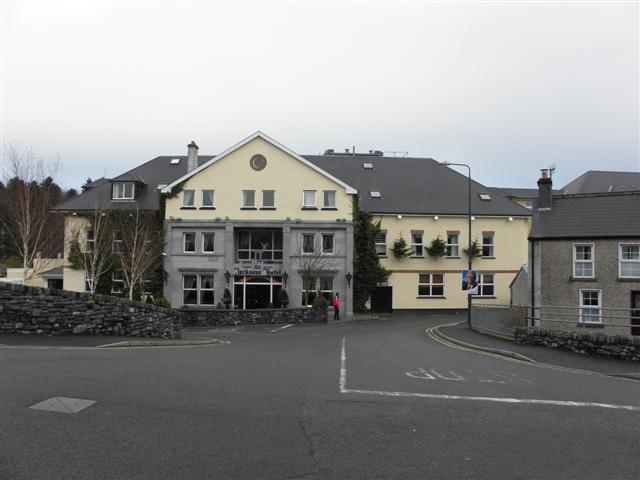
- Jackson's Hotel now occupies the site of Ballybofey station

General information
- Location: County Donegal; Ireland
- Coordinates: 54.7998°N 7.7863°W
- Elevation: 23 m (76 ft)

History
- Opened: 3 June 1895
- Closed: 15 December 1947
- Original company: Donegal Railway Company

Services
Preceding station	Disused railways	Following station
Ballindoon Bridge	Glenties to Stranorlar	Stranorlar
Location

Ballybofey railway station served the village of Ballybofey in County Donegal, Ireland.

== History ==
The station opened on 3 June 1895 on the Donegal Railway Company line from Glenties to Stranorlar.

It closed on 15 December 1947 when the County Donegal Railways Joint Committee closed the line from Glenties to Stranorlar in an effort to save money.

Freight services on the route continued until 10 March 1952.
