= Killymard Halt railway station =

Railway station in Ireland

Killymard Halt
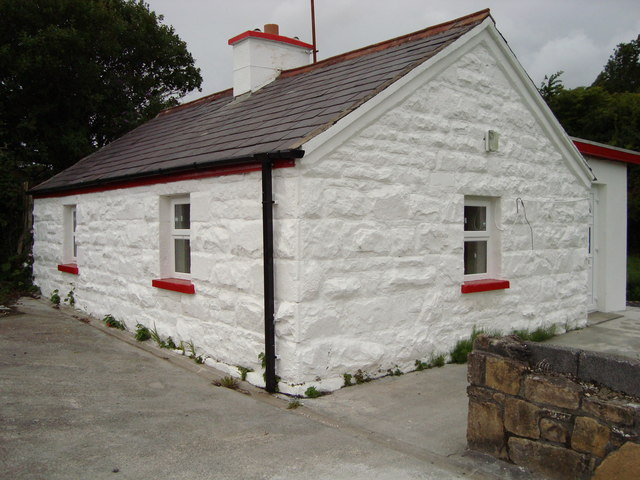
- Killymard Halt railway station

General information
- Location: Killymard, County Donegal; Ireland
- Coordinates: 54.648031°N 8.172503°W

History
- Original company: West Donegal Railway
- Post-grouping: County Donegal Railways Joint Committee

Key dates
- 18 August 1893: Station opens
- 1 August 1918: Station closes to passengers
- 6 July 1936: Station re-opens to passengers
- 1 November 1956: Station closes
Location

Killymard Halt railway station served Killymard in County Donegal, Ireland.

The station opened on 18 August 1893 on the Donegal Railway Company line from Donegal to Killybegs.

It closed on 1 November 1956.

== Routes ==
Preceding station	Disused railways	Following station
Donegal	Donegal Railway Company; Donegal to Killybegs	Mountcharles
