= Ballinamore railway station =

Former railway station in Ireland

Ballinamore
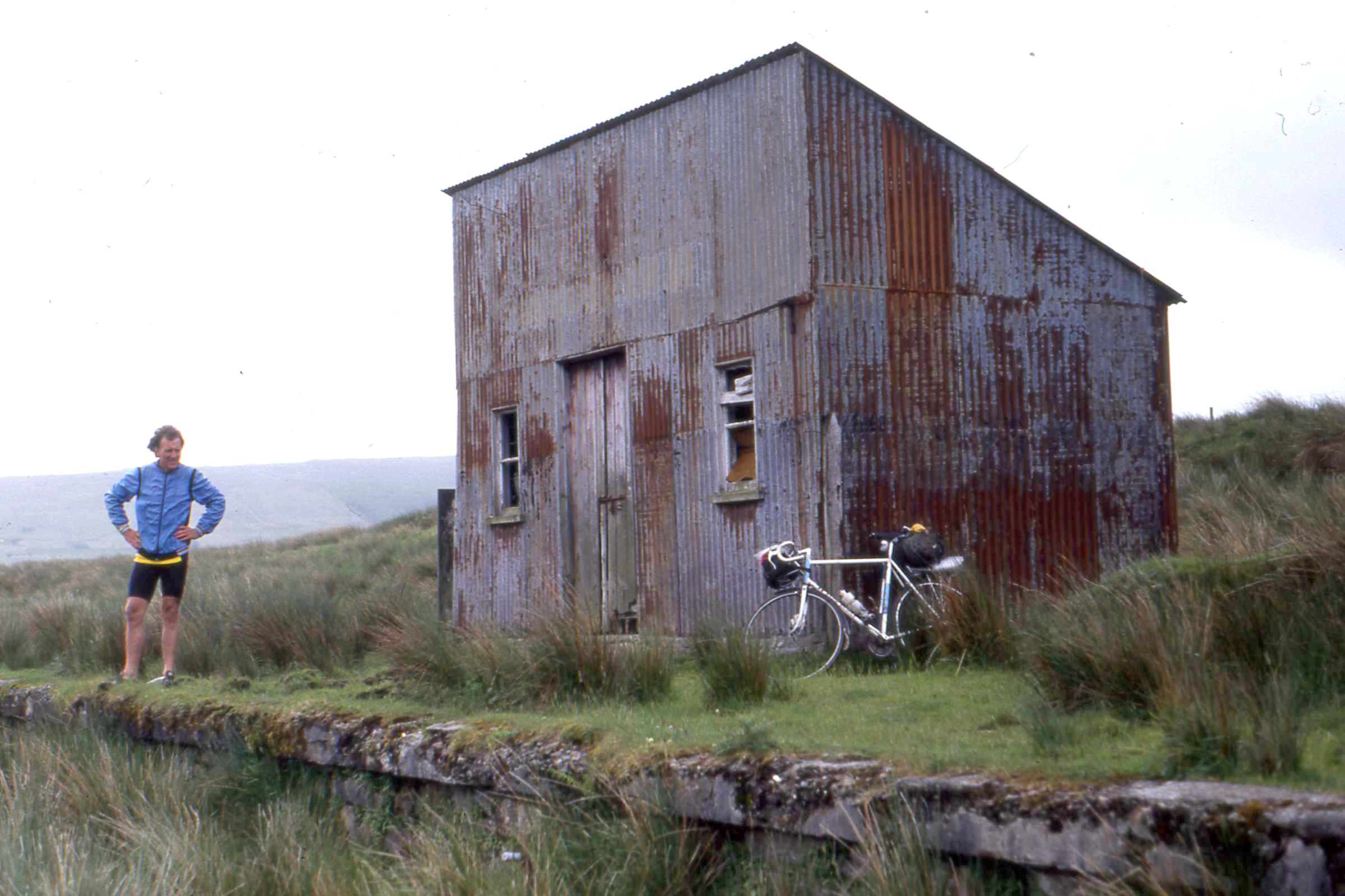
- The surviving remnants of Ballinamore station

General information
- Location: Ballinamore, County Donegal; Ireland
- Coordinates: 54.8658°N 8.0567°W
- Elevation: 412 ft (126 m)
- Tracks: Single

Construction
- Structure type: Halt

History
- Opened: 3 June 1895
- Closed: 15 December 1947
- Post-grouping: Donegal Railway Company

Services
Preceding station	Donegal Railway Company	Following station
Fintown	Glenties to Stranorlar	Glassagh Halt
Location

Ballinamore railway station was a halt which served the village of Ballinamore in County Donegal, Ireland.

The halt opened on 3 June 1895 on the Donegal Railway Company line from Glenties to Stranorlar.

It closed on 15 December 1947 when the County Donegal Railways Joint Committee closed the line from Glenties to Stranorlar in an effort to save money.

Freight services on the route continued until 10 March 1952.
