= Derg Bridge Halt railway station =

Railway station in Ireland

Derg Bridge Halt

General information
- Location: Derg Bridge, County Donegal; Ireland

History
- Original company: West Donegal Railway
- Post-grouping: County Donegal Railways Joint Committee

Key dates
- 2 December 1912: Station opens
- 1 January 1960: Station closes

Derg Bridge Halt railway station served Derg Bridge in County Donegal, Ireland.

The station opened on 2 December 1912 on the West Donegal Railway line from Stranorlar to Donegal.

It closed on 1 January 1960.

== Routes ==
Preceding station	Disused railways	Following station
Meenglas Halt	West Donegal Railway; Stranorlar to Donegal	Barnesmore Halt
