= Strabane railway station =

Rail facility in County Tyrone

Strabane (CDR)
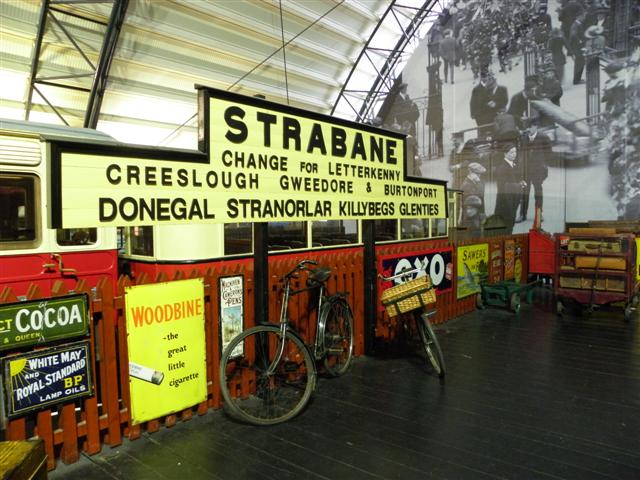
- Station sign in the Ulster Folk and Transport Museum in Cultra.

General information
- Location: Station Rd. Strabane, County Tyrone; Northern Ireland; UK
- Coordinates: 54.830478°N 7.470319°W
- Elevation: 13 ft (4.0 m)

Other information
- Status: Demolished

History
- Original company: Donegal Railway Company
- Post-grouping: County Donegal Railways Joint Committee

Key dates
- 16 July 1894: Station opens
- 1 January 1960: Station closes
Location

Strabane (GNRI)

General information
- Location: Railway St. Strabane, County Tyrone; Northern Ireland; UK
- Coordinates: 54.830478°N 7.470319°W
- Elevation: 13 ft (4.0 m)
- Platforms: 2
- Tracks: 2

Other information
- Status: Demolished

History
- Original company: Londonderry and Enniskillen Railway
- Post-grouping: Great Northern Railway (Ireland)

Key dates
- 19 April 1847: Station opens
- 15 February 1965: Station closes
Location

Strabane railway station was one of two terminals serving Strabane, County Tyrone in Northern Ireland. The GNI platforms were in service 1847–1965; the CDR platforms were in service 1894–1960.

== History ==
=== GNR ===
The Londonderry and Enniskillen Railway opened the station on 19 April 1847. It was taken over by the Great Northern Railway (Ireland) in 1883.

The Finn Valley Railway began Irish gauge (5 ft 3 in (1,600 mm)) services from this station to Stranorlar railway station from 7 September 1863. When this route was converted to 3 ft (914 mm) on 16 July 1894 the Donegal Railway Company built another station in Strabane adjacent to the GNRI railway station. The two stations were linked by a footbridge.

It closed on 15 February 1965 when the Ulster Transport Authority mothballed the Derry Road line.

=== CDR ===
The Finn Valley Railway operated an Irish Gauge route to Stranorlar from Strabane (GNI) railway station from 7 September 1863. When this route was converted to 3 ft (914 mm) on 16 July 1894 the Donegal Railway Company built Strabane (CDR) railway station adjacent to the existing Great Northern Railway (Ireland) railway station. The two stations were connected by a footbridge.

The station was also later the terminus for the Strabane and Letterkenny Railway which operated from 1909. The station closed on 1 January 1960.

=== Railway revival ===
It was proposed the station be reopened in 2023 by the All-Island Strategic Rail Review as part of a Derry—Portadown railway, although action has yet to be taken as of April 2024.

== Routes ==
=== GNR ===
Preceding station	Disused railways	Following station
Porthall	Londonderry and Enniskillen Railway; Londonderry to Enniskillen	Sion Mills
Clady	Finn Valley Railway; Strabane to Stranorlar 1863-1894	Terminus
	Proposed Services	
Omagh	All-Island Strategic Rail Review; Derry-Portadown Line	Derry ~ Londonderry

=== CDR ===
Preceding station	Disused railways	Following station
Terminus	Donegal Railway Company; Strabane to Stranorlar 1894-1960	Clady
Ballymagorry	Donegal Railway Company; Londonderry to Strabane 1900-1955	Terminus
Terminus	Strabane and Letterkenny Railway; Strabane to Letterkenny 1909-1960	Lifford Halt

== Current site use ==
The remains of the station were demolished in 1989 and the location is now occupied by an Asda car park.
