= Donegal railway station =

Railway station in County Donegal, Ireland

Donegal
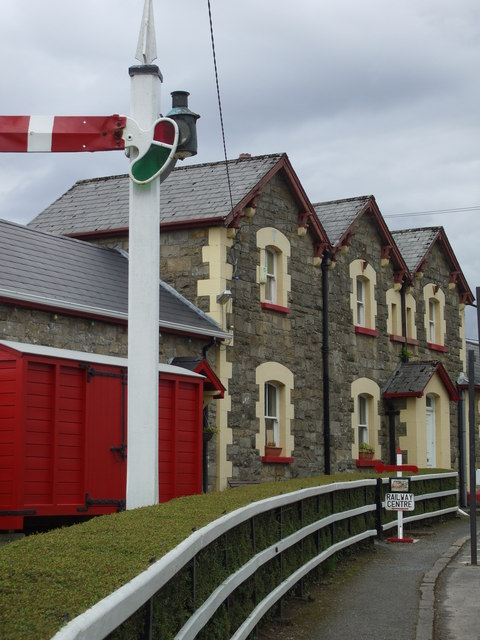
- Railway station buildings in Donegal, now the Donegal Railway Centre

General information
- Location: Donegal, County Donegal; Ireland
- Coordinates: 54.65673°N 8.10855°W

History
- Original company: West Donegal Railway
- Post-grouping: County Donegal Railways Joint Committee

Key dates
- 16 September 1889: Station opens
- 1 January 1960: Station closes
Location

Donegal railway station served Donegal in County Donegal, Ireland. It was served by connections to Derry, Killybegs and Ballyshannon.

== History ==
The station opened on 16 September 1889 on the West Donegal Railway line from Stranorlar to Donegal. In 1906 the station, along with the rest of the line became part of the County Donegal Railways Joint Committee. The station closed on 1 January 1960. However such was the attachment to the Donegal railways that after the line from Donegal town to Ballyshannon closed down in 1959, two of the railway workers continued to operate a freight service between the two towns for a month before the railway bosses in Dublin realised what was happening.

== Current status ==
The station buildings have since been restored by the County Donegal Railway Restoration Society, and from 1995 the home of the Donegal Railway Centre.

== Rail accident ==
In 1949, two trains collided head-on near Donegal. A driver and two passengers were killed.

== Routes ==
Preceding station	Disused railways	Following station
Clarbridge Halt	West Donegal Railway; Stranorlar to Donegal	Terminus
Terminus	Donegal Railway Company; Donegal to Killybegs	Killymard Halt
Terminus	Donegal Railway Company; Donegal to Ballyshannon	Hospital Halt
