= Clarbridge Halt railway station =

Railway station in Ireland

Clarbridge Halt

General information
- Location: Clarbridge, County Donegal; Ireland

History
- Original company: West Donegal Railway
- Post-grouping: County Donegal Railways Joint Committee

Key dates
- 1 February 1891: Station opens
- 1 January 1960: Station closes
Location

Clarbridge Halt railway station served Clarbridge in County Donegal, Ireland.

The station opened on 1 February 1891 on the West Donegal Railway line from Stranorlar to Donegal.

It closed on 1 January 1960.

== Routes ==
Preceding station	Disused railways	Following station
Lough Eske Halt	West Donegal Railway; Stranorlar to Donegal	Donegal
