= Meenglas Halt railway station =

Railway station in Ireland

Meenglas Halt

General information
- Location: Stranorlar, County Donegal; Ireland

History
- Original company: West Donegal Railway
- Post-grouping: County Donegal Railways Joint Committee

Key dates
- 1 January 1891: Station opens
- 1 January 1919: Passenger services suspended
- 6 July 1936: Passenger services resume
- 1 November 1956: Station closes to all but excursion traffic
Location

Meenglas Halt railway station served Meenglas near Stranorlar in County Donegal, Ireland.

The station opened on 1 January 1891 on the West Donegal Railway line from Stranorlar to Donegal.

It closed on 1 November 1956.

== Routes ==
Preceding station	Disused railways	Following station
Stranorlar	West Donegal Railway; Stranorlar to Donegal	Derg Bridge Halt
