= Liscooly railway station =

Railway station in Ireland

Liscooly

General information
- Location: Liscooley; County Donegal; Ireland
- Coordinates: 54.7984°N 7.642262°W

History
- Original company: Finn Valley Railway
- Post-grouping: County Donegal Railways Joint Committee

Key dates
- 7 September 1863: Station opens
- 1 January 1960: Station closes
Location

Liscooly railway station served the village of Liscooley in County Donegal, Ireland.

The station opened on 7 September 1863 on the Finn Valley Railway line from Strabane to Stranorlar and closed on 1 January 1960.

== Routes ==
Preceding station	Disused railways	Following station
Castlefinn	Finn Valley Railway; Strabane to Stranorlar	Killygordon
