= Lough Eske railway station =

Railway station in Ireland

Lough Eske

General information
- Location: Druminin, County Donegal; Ireland

History
- Original company: West Donegal Railway
- Post-grouping: County Donegal Railways Joint Committee

Key dates
- 25 April 1882: Station opens as Druminin
- 16 September 1889: Station renamed Lough Eske
- 1 January 1960: Station closes
Location

Lough Eske railway station served Druminin in County Donegal, Ireland. The station is near Lough Eske one of the scenic delights of the area.

The station opened on 25 April 1882 on the West Donegal Railway line from Stranorlar to Donegal.

It closed on 1 January 1960.

== Routes ==
Preceding station	Disused railways	Following station
Barnesmore Halt	West Donegal Railway; Stranorlar to Druminin 1882 - 1889	Terminus
Barnesmore Halt	West Donegal Railway; Stranorlar to Donegal 1889 - 1960	Clarbridge Halt
