= Drumbar Halt railway station =

Railway station in Ireland

Drumbar Halt Stad Droim Bairr

General information
- Location: Donegal, County Donegal; Ireland
- Coordinates: 54°38′31″N 8°04′48″W

History
- Original company: West Donegal Railway
- Post-grouping: County Donegal Railways Joint Committee

Key dates
- 1 August 1906: Station opens
- 1 October 1920: Station closes to passengers
- 1 October 1921: Station re-opens to passengers
- 1 January 1960: Station closes
Location

Drumbar Halt railway station served Donegal in County Donegal, Ireland.

The station opened on 1 August 1906 on the Donegal Railway Company line from Donegal to Ballyshannon.

It closed on 1 January 1960.

== Routes ==
Preceding station	Disused railways	Following station
Hospital Halt	Donegal Railway Company; Donegal to Ballyshannon	Laghey
