= Town Bridge Halt railway station =

Railway station in Ireland

Town Bridge Town Bridge

General information
- Location: Stranorlar, County Donegal; Ireland

History
- Post-grouping: County Donegal Railways Joint Committee

Key dates
- 1 May 1934: Station opens
- 15 December 1947: Station closes

Town Bridge Halt railway station served Town Bridge near Stranorlar in County Donegal, Ireland.

The station opened on 1 May 1934 on the Finn Valley Railway line from Strabane to Stranorlar.

It closed on 15 December 1947.

== Routes ==
Preceding station	Disused railways	Following station
Cavan Halt	Finn Valley Railway; Strabane to Stranorlar	Stranorlar
