= Cavan Halt railway station =

Railway station in County Donegal, Ireland

Cavan Halt

General information
- Location: County Donegal; Ireland

History
- Post-grouping: County Donegal Railways Joint Committee

Key dates
- 1 June 1931: Station opens
- 1 January 1960: Station closes

Cavan Halt railway station served Cavan in County Donegal, Ireland.

The station opened on 1 June 1931 on the Finn Valley Railway line from Strabane to Stranorlar.

It closed on 1 January 1960.

== Routes ==
Preceding station	Disused railways	Following station
Killygordon	Finn Valley Railway; Strabane to Stranorlar	Town Bridge Halt
