= Elatagh Halt railway station =

Railway station in Ireland

Elatagh Halt

General information
- Location: County Donegal; Ireland

History
- Post-grouping: Donegal Railway Company

Key dates
- 1 November 1930: Station opens
- 15 December 1947: Station closes

Elatagh Halt railway station served the area of Letterbrick in County Donegal, Ireland.

The station opened on 1 November 1930 on the Donegal Railway Company line from Glenties to Stranorlar.

It closed on 15 December 1947 when the County Donegal Railways Joint Committee closed the line from Glenties to Stranorlar in an effort to save money.

Freight services on the route continued until 10 March 1952.

== Routes ==
| Preceding station | Disused railways | Following station |
|---|---|---|
| Cronadun Bridge | Donegal Railway Company; Glenties to Stranorlar | Cloghan |
