= Cronadun Bridge railway station =

Railway station in Ireland

Cronadun Bridge

General information
- Location: County Donegal; Ireland

History
- Post-grouping: Donegal Railway Company

Key dates
- 1 August 1944: Station opens
- 15 December 1947: Station closes

Cronadun Bridge railway station served the area of Letterbrick in County Donegal, Ireland.

The station opened on 1 August 1944 on the Donegal Railway Company line from Glenties to Stranorlar.

It closed on 15 December 1947 when the County Donegal Railways Joint Committee closed the line from Glenties to Stranorlar in an effort to save money.

Freight services on the route continued until 10 March 1952.

== Routes ==
Preceding station	Disused railways	Following station
Glassagh Halt	Donegal Railway Company; Glenties to Stranorlar	Elatagh Halt
