= Cullion railway station =

Railway station in Northern Ireland

Cullion

General information
- Location: County Tyrone, Northern Ireland; UK
- Coordinates: 54.914231°N 7.363989°W

History
- Original company: Donegal Railway Company
- Post-grouping: County Donegal Railways Joint Committee

Key dates
- 6 August 1900: Station opens
- July 1924: Unstaffed halt
- 1 January 1955: Station closes
Location

Disambiguation: Cullion (Kinawley)

Cullion railway station served Cullion, County Tyrone in Northern Ireland.

It was opened by the Donegal Railway Company on 6 August 1900. It became an unstaffed halt in July 1924. It closed on 1 January 1955.

== Routes ==
Preceding station	Disused railways	Following station
Desertone Halt	Donegal Railway Company; Londonderry to Strabane 1900-1955	Donemana
