= Desertone Halt railway station =

Railway station in Northern Ireland

Desertone Halt

General information
- Location: County Londonderry, Northern Ireland; UK
- Coordinates: 54.933425°N 7.351775°W

History
- Original company: Donegal Railway Company
- Post-grouping: County Donegal Railways Joint Committee

Key dates
- 1 May 1908: Station opens
- 1 January 1955: Station closes
Location

Desertone Halt railway station served Disertowen and Magheramason, County Londonderry in Northern Ireland.

It was opened by the Donegal Railway Company on 1 May 1908.

It closed on 1 January 1955.

== Routes ==
Preceding station	Disused railways	Following station
New Buildings	Donegal Railway Company; Londonderry to Strabane 1900-1955	Cullion
