= Glenmore railway station (Ireland) =

Railway station in Ireland

Glenmore

General information
- Location: County Donegal; Ireland
- Coordinates: 54°49′N 7°52′W

History
- Post-grouping: Donegal Railway Company

Key dates
- 3 June 1895: Station opens
- 15 December 1947: Station closes
Location

Glenmore railway station served the village of Glenmore, County Donegal in County Donegal, Ireland.

The station opened on 3 June 1895 on the Donegal Railway Company line from Glenties to Stranorlar.

It closed on 15 December 1947 when the County Donegal Railways Joint Committee closed the line from Glenties to Stranorlar in an effort to save money.

Freight services on the route continued until 10 March 1952.

== Routes ==
Preceding station	Disused railways	Following station
Cloghan	Donegal Railway Company; Glenties to Stranorlar	Ballindoon Bridge
