= New Buildings railway station =

Former railway station in Northern Ireland

Coordinates: 54.9593°N 7.3543°W

New Buildings

General information
- Location: Newbuildings, County Londonderry; Northern Ireland; UK
- System: railway station

History
- Original company: Donegal Railway Company
- Post-grouping: County Donegal Railways Joint Committee

Key dates
- 6 August 1900: Station opens
- 1 January 1955: Station closes
Location
- Location within Northern Ireland

New Buildings railway station served Newbuildings, County Londonderry in Northern Ireland. New Buildings railway was very popular with local people, especially for excursions such as Sunday school outings, and trips to the seaside. Rabbits were also caught and sent to London by train and boat. Salmon was caught in the Foyle and sent to Billingsgate Market the next day. It was opened by the Donegal Railway Company on 6 August 1900. It closed on 1 January 1955.

== Routes ==
| Preceding station | Disused railways | Following station |
|---|---|---|
| Londonderry Victoria Road | Donegal Railway Company; Londonderry to Strabane 1900-1955 | Desertone Halt |
