= Hospital Halt railway station =

Railway station in Donegal, Ireland

Hospital Halt

General information
- Location: Donegal, County Donegal; Ireland

History
- Original company: County Donegal Railways Joint Committee
- Post-grouping: County Donegal Railways Joint Committee

Key dates
- 1 June 1935: Station opens
- 15 December 1947: Station closes

Hospital Halt railway station served Donegal in County Donegal, Ireland.

The station opened on 1 June 1935 on the Donegal Railway Company line from Donegal to Ballyshannon.

It closed on 15 December 1947.

== Routes ==
Preceding station	Disused railways	Following station
Donegal	Donegal Railway Company; Donegal to Ballyshannon	Drumbar Halt
