= Lough Eske =

Lake in County Donegal, Ireland

- Loch Iascaigh (Irish)
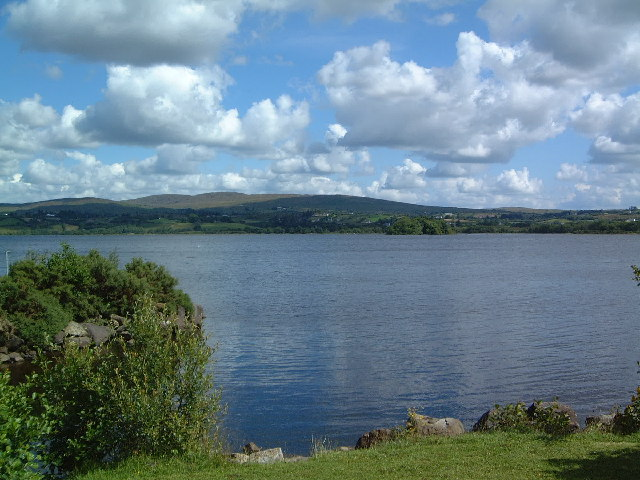
- Looking east

- Location in Ireland
- Location: County Donegal
- Coordinates: 54.6996°N 8.0399°W
- Primary inflows: Clashalbin River, Lowerymore River, Corabber River, Clady Burn
- Primary outflows: River Eske
- Basin countries: Ireland
- Max. length: maximum of 3.7 km (2.3 mi)
- Max. width: maximum of 2 km (1.2 mi)
- Surface area: 900 acres (3.6 km^{2})
- Surface elevation: 27 m (89 ft)
- Islands: Pigeon's Island, Grania's Island, Island O'Donnell, Roshin Island
- Settlements: Donegal (nearest town)

Lough Eske or Lough Eask (from Irish Loch Iascaigh or Loch Iasc 'Lake of the Fish') is a small lake in County Donegal, Ireland. The lake lies to the northeast of Donegal Town, to which it is connected by the River Eske. The lake is about 900 acres (3.6 km^{2}) in size and is surrounded to the north, east and west by the Bluestack Mountains, which occupy much of southern County Donegal.

== Recreation ==
The lake and its tributaries are popular for fishing, especially for spring salmon, sea trout and char, with the season running from 1 March to 30 September. Because of its scenic and unspoiled surroundings, the lake is a popular getaway destination, with two major hotels on its shores. The area also has many forest paths: unassigned paths on the south-western shores of the lake and there are also newly reconstructed paths in Ardnamona Wood.

== Local population ==
According to the 2006 census results, there are 119 people living in the 'Lough Eask Rural Area', down 16 (11.9%) from 2002.

== History ==
The powerful Ó Domhnaill (O'Donnell) clan had a castle and surrounding bawn on Island O'Donnell, an island near the southern shore of the lough. Part of this bawn still stands on Island O'Donnell. This castle was often used as a prison by the Ó Domhnaill chieftains.

Following the burning of the Franciscan Friary in Donegal Town in September 1601, the friars were forced to flee into the surrounding countryside. They set up a new friary on the western shores of Lough Eske, giving the name of 'The Friary' to the local townland in the district of Killymard, and the 'Friar's Walk' along the shore of the lake. The friars remained in the vicinity of the lake for most of the following century but a Royal Proclamation in August 1687, ordering all Catholic clergy to leave Ireland within nine months, dealt the final blow to the Order in the Donegal area. Since they were brought to Donegal Town in the sixteenth century, the friars had had to abandon their convent on several occasions and it was frequently attacked and damaged, unsurprising given the political instability between the English and Gaelic Irish Lords at the time. About the time of the Royal Proclamation, it's believed the Friars were based around the lake once more, close to Barnesmore on the east shore, near Roshin Island in the southeast corner of the lake, which is believed to have been used as a graveyard by the friars. There is still evidence of graves on the island to this day.

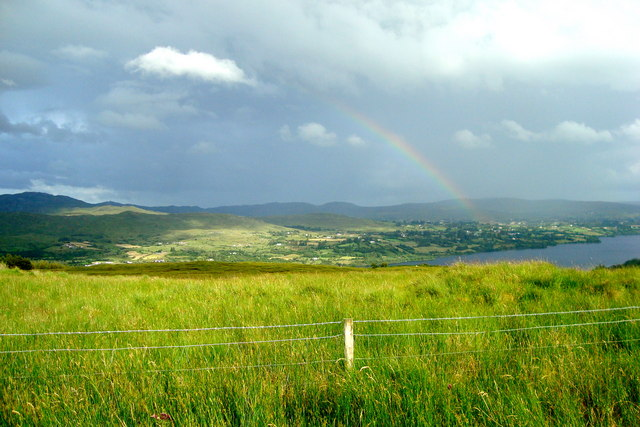
Hills surrounding Lough Eske

Following the Flight of the Earls in 1607, the Plantation of Ulster saw this area of Donegal granted to Sir Basil Brooke, who rebuilt and extended Donegal Castle. About this time a manor was also constructed on the shores of Lough Eske by Scottish settlers, a cornerstone at the manor was later noted to have been inscribed with the date 1621. In the first half of the nineteenth century, the Brooke family estates were passed to Thomas Young (who changed his name to Thomas Brooke) of Lough Eske Manor, through marriage with the heiress to the estate, Jane Grove. Thomas first built a new Church of Ireland called Christ Church on the southern shore of the Lake in 1846, before hiring the Derry architect Fitzgibbon Louch to completely redesign the existing manor house; the result was a grand Elizabethan-style residence finished in 1868 which became known as Lough Eske Castle.

Major-General Henry George White (1835-1906) purchased Lough Eske Castle in 1894 from Arthur Brooke, who was a distant cousin of General White's. After the Major-General's death in 1906, Lough Eske Castle became the new home of the General's son, (then Captain) Henry Herbert Ronald White (1879-1939), and his new bride, Florence Arnott White (1879-1958). She was the daughter of Sir John Arnott who founded Arnott's Department Store in Dublin in 1843; Sir John also owned The Irish Times newspaper, served as Mayor of Cork (1859–61), and was a Member of Parliament (1859–63), amongst other ventures in the Irish railway and shipping industry.

Major-General Henry George White's remains are buried at his beloved Lough Eske Castle, and a large, elaborately carved, Celtic high cross marks his grave and is located a half mile from the castle where the front drive skirts the lake at its most picturesque point. A British soldier, the general was well liked and respected by the local people as he was a benevolent landowner known for his charitable acts, as well has his generous donations to Christ Church. In 1911, Captain Henry Herbert Ronald White and his wife commissioned the addition to the east end of the castle which included a ballroom, billiards room, and several bedrooms and bathrooms. After 1929, the castle became a guest house and in 1939, just weeks after (now Major) Henry Herbert Ronald White's sudden death while on holiday in California, Lough Eske Castle nearly burned to the ground due to a candle left burning in the ballroom. Major Henry Herbert Ronald White was survived by his wife and two sons, Henry George Ronald White (1907-2005, an American citizen) and John Maxwell White (1909-1988). The castle was eventually sold and later became a guest house before falling into a state of complete ruin.

The castle reopened as the Solis Lough Eske Castle Hotel in December 2007. The estate church constructed in 1846 is still used as the Church of Ireland parish church.

A 'Famine Pot' from a local workhouse used during the Great Famine is located on the shores of the lake, a testament to all those who lost their lives or were forced to emigrate in the 1840s and 1850s.

== The 'Lough Eske Monster' ==
In July 1998, the Irish Daily Star published a story entitled ‘Look out, it's Eskie’, which made claims of a ‘monster’ sighting in the lake. Staff and residents at Harvey's Point Hotel told the reporter that at 2.30pm on Sunday, 28 June 1998, they saw an unidentified object moving about 300 metres from the shore. Other locals interviewed, including bed-and-breakfast owners Annabel and Kieran Clarke, repeated some of the local folklore when they told the paper that ‘some lakes in County Donegal are said to be connected by current to Scotland’, suggesting a link with the Loch Ness Monster. Some people implied that the Lough Eske Monster was a publicity stunt by the chairman of the local Donegal Summer Festival committee, Zack Gallagher. He has always denied this and has gone on record as believing in the existence of the beast. The idea of a monster in Lough Eske was not raised after this and some commentators think it may have been a lost seal that swam the short distant up the River Eske from Donegal Bay.

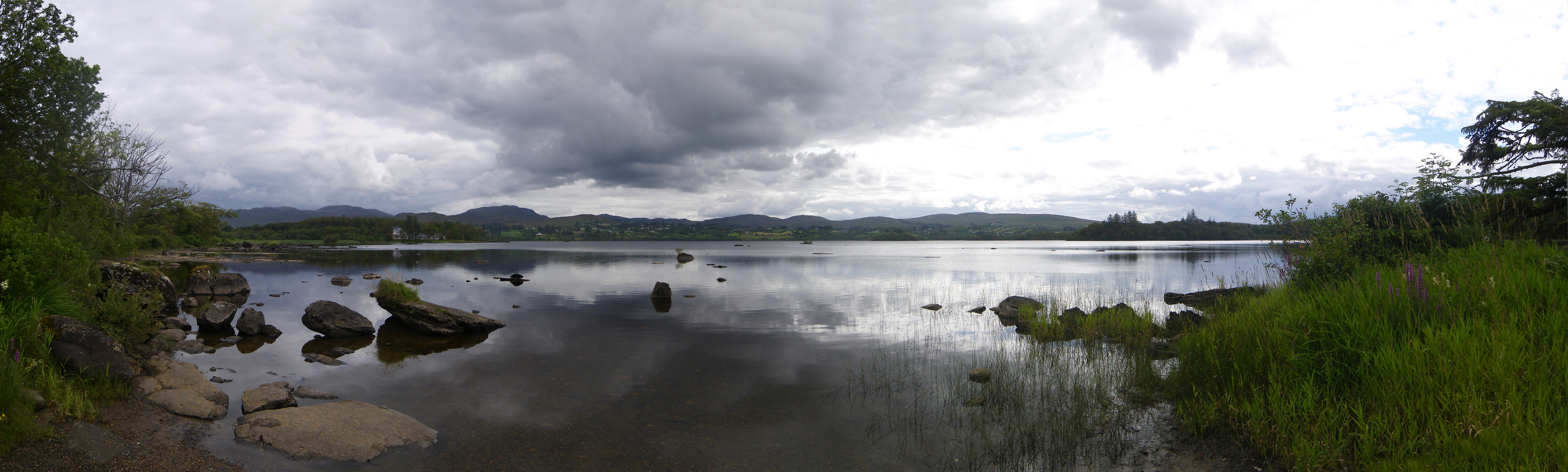
Lough Eske from Harvey's Point

== See also ==
- List of loughs in Ireland
- Lough Eske railway station
