= Fleming Agri Products =

Manufacturer of agricultural machinery

Fleming Agri Products is a manufacturer of agricultural machinery, based in Newbuildings, County Londonderry, Northern Ireland.

The company was founded in Donegal by Robert John Fleming in 1860, and remains a family-controlled company. The current factory was established in 1983.

In 2018 the current chairman George Fleming announced a $4-million expansion, intending to reach new international markets. The company already sells its products in Europe, Australia and New Zealand. At that time George Fleming referred to Brexit as "another hurdle", stating that the company had dealt with a hard border in Ireland until 1992. He has since said that the company might open facilities in Donegal in the event of a no-deal Brexit, as 30% of the company's customers are in the Republic of Ireland.
