= Cappry, County Donegal =

Cappry Cabraigh
- Townland
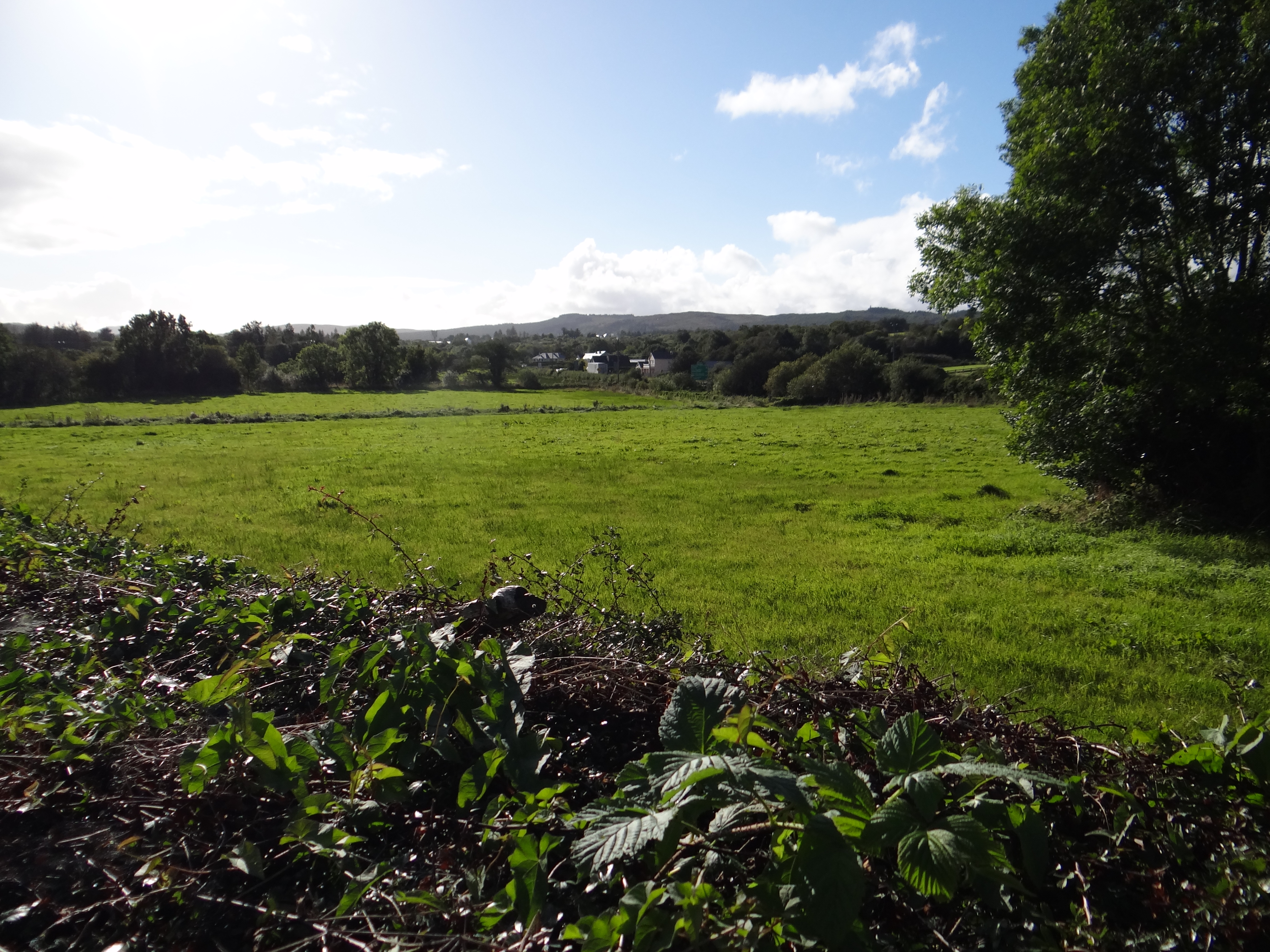
- Fields in Cappry townland
- Interactive map of Cappry
- Coordinates: 54.7951°N 7.8155°W
- Country: Ireland
- Province: Ulster
- County: County Donegal
- Region: Finn Valley

Area
  - Total: 3.0061 km^{2} (1.1607 sq mi)

Population (2011)
  - Total: 764
- Time zones: (GMT+1)
- (IST)
- Postal code: F93

Cappry (Irish: Cabraigh), also known as Cappry Lane, is a townland in the Finn Valley area of County Donegal in Ireland. It is to the west of the town of Ballybofey within the electoral division of Dooish. It is also in the civil and Catholic parishes of Stranorlar. Cappry townland lies on the N15 road (Donegal Road) between Ballybofey and Barnesmore.

== Amenities ==
Roadhouse Bar and Restaurant is a pub located at Cappry Lane outside Ballybofey. There is also a furniture shop on the Donegal Road at Cappry.

The local national (primary) schools include Dooish National School in Dooish and Saint Mary's National School, also known as 'Scoil Mhuire', in Stranorlar.

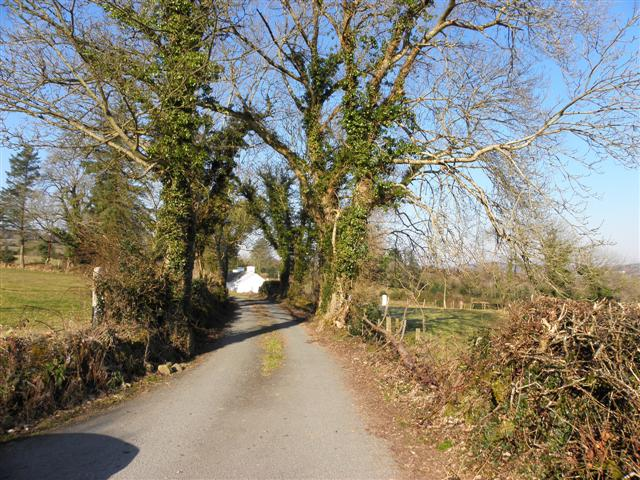
Cappry Lane near Ballybofey

== Townlands and electoral divisions ==
The townlands which border Cappry and Cappry Lane, most of which are in Dooish or Goland electoral divisions, include:

Townland	Gaeilge	Electoral Division
Cappry	Cabraigh	Dooish ED
Mullanachose	~	Dooish ED
Dooish	An Dubhais	Dooish ED
Cappry (Graham)	Cabraigh (Ghreumach)	Dooish ED
Carrickmagrath	Carraig Mhic Craith	Dooish ED
Goland	An Gabhlán	Goland ED

== Sport ==
Cappry Rovers Football Club is the local association football (soccer) club. Around three miles away is the home ground of Finn Harps in Ballybofey. Cappry is the homeplace of Ireland rugby player and coach, Larissa Muldoon.
