= R267 road (Ireland) =

Road in Ireland

R267 road
- Bóthar R267
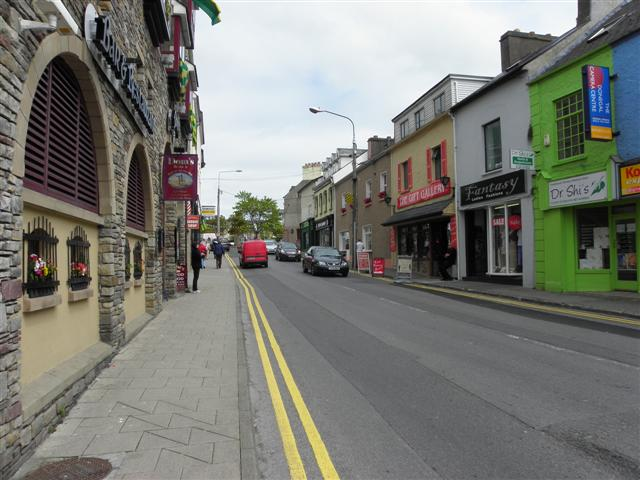
- Quay Street, Donegal Town, on the R267

Route information
- Length: 5.6 km (3.5 mi)

Location
- Country: Ireland
- Primary destinations: County Donegal; leaves the N15 road at Tullymornin; Donegal Town; Terminates at the junction with the N15 road near Donegal Town

Highway system
- Roads in Ireland; Motorways; Primary; Secondary; Regional

The R267 road is a regional road in County Donegal, Ireland. The road links Donegal Town with the N15, a road which runs around the eastern and south-eastern edge of Donegal Town. The N15 forms part of the main road between Derry and Sligo Town. The R267, parts of which are known as the Derry Road or the Ballybofey Road within Donegal Town, crosses the Drumenny Burn between The Northern Garage and the District Hospital, near where the burn enters the River Eske. The road is 5.6 km (3.5 mi) long.

== See also ==
- Roads in Ireland
- National primary road
- National secondary road
