= Killymard =

Civil parish in County Donegal, Ireland

Coordinates: 54°43′21″N 8°6′12″W

Killymard is a civil parish, in the barony of Banagh in the county of Donegal, and province of Ulster.

== Railways ==
The Killymard Halt railway station opened on 18 August 1893 on the Donegal Railway Company line from Donegal to Killybegs.

It closed on 1 November 1956.

== Townlands ==
- Townlands
- Google
