= Newbuildings =

Village in County Londonderry, Northern Ireland

Coordinates: 54.958°N 7.355°W

Newbuildings: Irish: An Baile Nua
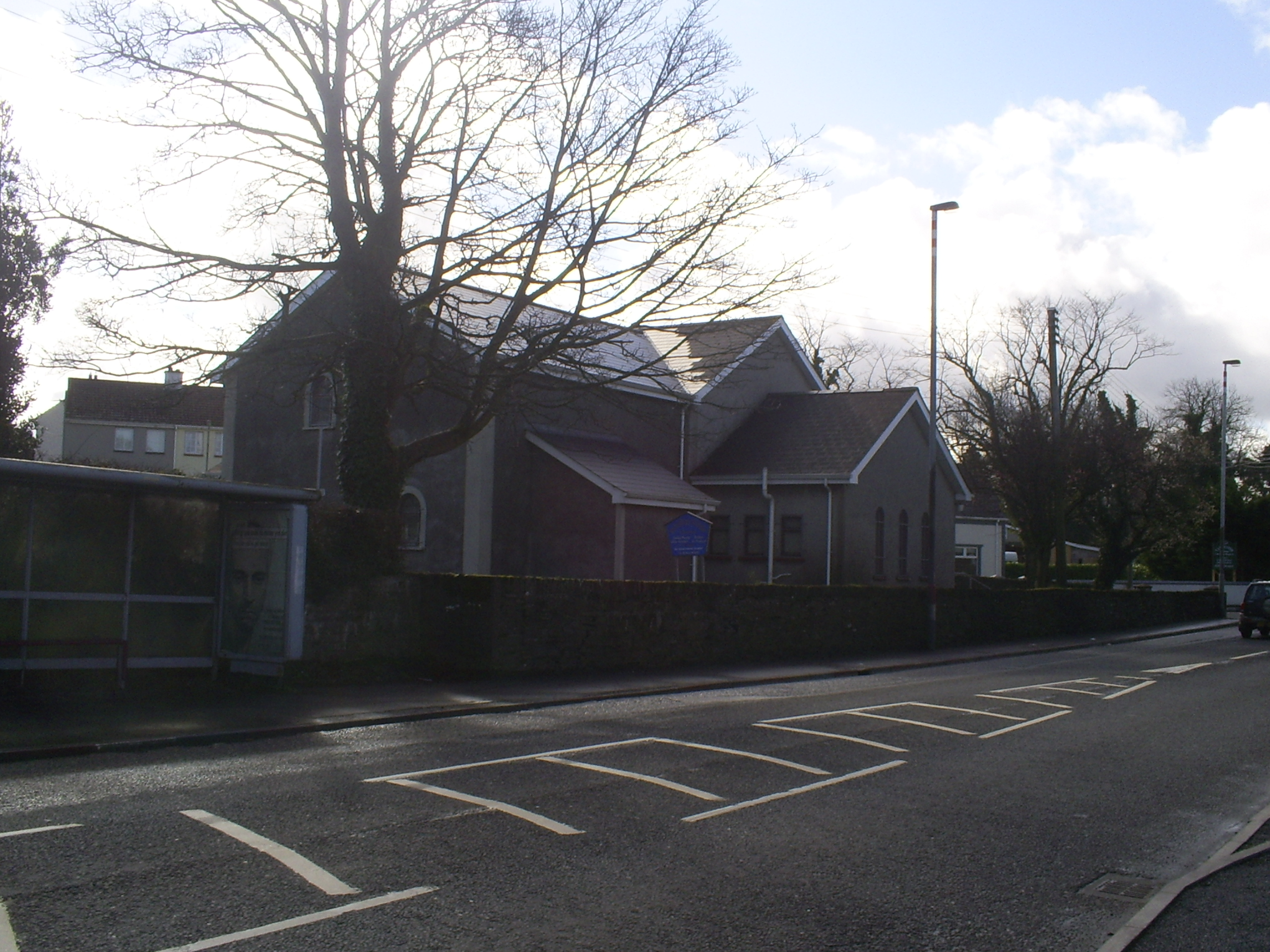

- Location within Northern Ireland
- Population: 2,837 (2021 census)
- Irish grid reference: C412124
  - Belfast: 62 mi (100 km)
- District: Derry City and Strabane
- County: County Londonderry
- Country: Northern Ireland
- Sovereign state: United Kingdom
- Post town: LONDONDERRY
- Postcode district: BT47
- Dialling code: 028
- UK Parliament: Foyle
- NI Assembly: Foyle

Newbuildings or New Buildings is a large village in County Londonderry, Northern Ireland. It lies close to the banks of the River Foyle and 3 mi (5 km) south of the city of Derry. It had a population of 2,837 in the 2021 census. It is within Derry and Strabane district.

== History ==
The village was founded in the early 17th century as part of the Plantation of Ulster, on land allocated to the Worshipful Company of Goldsmiths of London. It remained a small settlement until the 1960s, until large amounts of social housing was built on adjoining townlands. Today, the village has four churches (Methodist, Independent Methodist, Church of Ireland and Roman Catholic). It also has two primary schools – one administered by the Western Education and Library Board, one by the Council for Catholic Maintained Schools. Newbuildings also has a post office, community association, retail units and a wide range of housing.

Newbuildings is represented in the Loyalist flute band scene by Pride of the Orange and Blue Flute Band, formed in 1979.

== Geography ==
Newbuildings sits on an area of flat land between Clondermot Hill to the east and the River Foyle to the west.

It is within the parish of Clondermott & Glendermott. This parish is split into a number of townlands, whose names mostly come from the Irish language. Over time, the urban area of Newbuildings has spread into the following townlands:

- Ballyore (from Irish Baile Odhar)
- Dunhugh (from Dún Aodha meaning "Hugh's fort")
- Gortin (from An Goirtín meaning "the small enclosed field")
- Kittybane (from Céide Bán meaning "white flat-topped hill")
- Magheracanon (from Machaire Canánach meaning "plain of the canon")
- Primity
- Prehen
- Rossnagalliagh (from Ros na gCailleach meaning "wood of the Cailleach")

== Transport ==
Between 1900 and 1955 the County Donegal Railways Joint Committee had a station in Newbuildings, the line running from Stranorlar and other destinations and along the east bank of the River Foyle from Strabane to Londonderry Victoria Road. New Buildings railway station opened on 6 August 1900 and finally closed on 1 January 1955.

== Sports ==
Newbuildings United F.C. plays association football in the Northern Ireland Intermediate League.

Newbuildings Cricket Club plays in the North West Championship

== Demographics ==
Newbuildings is classified by the NI Statistics and Research Agency (NISRA) as being within Derry Urban Area (DUA). On Census day (27 March 2011) there were 3,381 people living in Newbuildings ward. Of these:

- 20.38% were aged under 16 years and 13.36% were aged 65 and over
- 48.27% of the population were male and 51.73% were female
- 58.72% were from a Protestant background and 37.90% were from a Catholic background
- 5.20% of people aged 16–74 were unemployed.

For more details see: NI Neighbourhood Information Service

== Deprivation ==
According to the Northern Ireland Multiple Deprivation Measure (NIMDM) of 2005, of 582 wards in Northern Ireland, 'New Buildings' was ranked as the 259th most deprived.
