= Drumenny Burn =

Location
- Country: Ireland
- Province: Ulster
- County: County Donegal
- Barony: Tirhugh
- Area: South Donegal

Physical characteristics
- Source
  - location: The townland of Straness, on the southern slopes of Clogher Hill, very near Leghowney
- Mouth: River Eske
  - location: Donegal Town
  - coordinates: 54°39′26″N 8°05′53″W
- Length: 7.5 miles (12.1 km) approx.

Basin features
- River system: River Eske

The Drumenny Burn, also known as the Drumonny Burn, the Drumenny River, the Drummenny River or the Drimminy River, is a burn in the south of County Donegal in Ulster, the northern province in Ireland. The lower stretch of the burn flows around the eastern edge of Donegal Town, where it flows into the River Eske. In the Ulster Scots dialect, a 'burn' is a stream or small river. The Drumenny Burn probably takes its name from the townland of Drumenny Upper, through which it flows, or else from the townlands of Drumenny Middle and Drumenny Lower, around the edges of which it flows. Almost all of the burn flows within the Civil Parish of Donegal.

== Course ==
The Drumenny Burn is around 7.5 miles (12.1 km) in length. The burn rises where the eastern end of the townland of Straness (sometimes spelled as Strathnas) meets the western end of the townland of Barnesyneilly, on the southern slopes of Clogher Hill, very near Straness Wind Farm, just over 7 miles east-north-east of Donegal Town. It flows in a mainly westerly direction from its source. In the townland of Drumenny Lower, on the eastern outskirts of Donegal Town, the burn flows under the Donegal Town Bypass, part of the N15.

The lower stretch of the burn flows along the eastern edge of Donegal Town, part of this stretch flowing alongside the Old Laghey Road. The burn flows along the edge of both Brú na Mara and Farmleigh Park, two housing estates just off the Old Laghey Road, on the eastern edge of Donegal Town. The burn then flows under the Ballybofey Road (part of the R267), flowing under a bridge located between The Northern Garage and Donegal Town Community Hospital, entering the River Eske very near this location, on the north-eastern edge of the town.
