= Croaghgorm =

Mountain in County Donegal, Ireland

- Cruach Ghorm
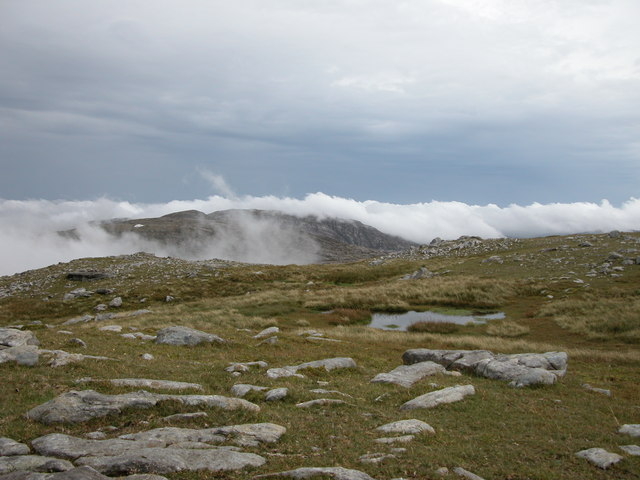
- Summit of Croaghgorm

Highest point
- Elevation: 674 m (2,211 ft)
- Prominence: 541 m (1,775 ft)
- Listing: Marilyn, Hewitt
- Coordinates: 54°45′15″N 8°04′52″W

Naming
- English translation: blue stack
- Language of name: Irish

Geography
- Location within island of Ireland
- Location: County Donegal, Ireland
- Parent range: Bluestack Mountains
- OSI/OSNI grid: G948895

Croaghgorm or Bluestack (from Irish an Chruach Gorm, meaning 'the blue stack') is a 674-metre (2,211 ft) mountain in County Donegal, Ireland. It is the highest of the Blue Stack Mountains (or Croaghgorms) and the third-highest mountain in County Donegal.

On 31 January 1944, during World War II, a Royal Air Force (RAF) Sunderland plane crashed on the mountain. Seven RAF crewmen from 228 Squadron were killed. Wreckage from the plane can still be seen on the mountain's slopes. A memorial plaque was unveiled in 1988.

== See also ==
- List of mountains in Ireland
