= River Eske =

River in County Donegal, Ireland

Coordinates: 54°39′N 8°07′W

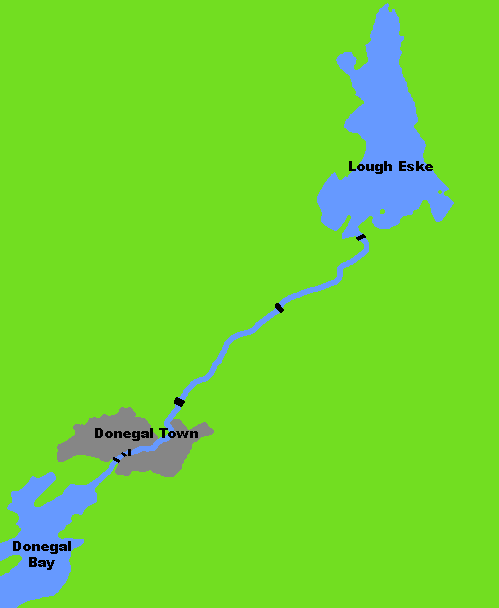
- Map showing the flow of River Eske and the six road bridges that cross it
- Etymology: From Irish iasc, "fish"
- Native name: An Iascaigh (Irish)

Location
- Country: Ireland
- Province: Ulster
- County: County Donegal
- Barony: Tirhugh

Physical characteristics
- Source
  - location: Lough Eske
- Mouth
  - location: Atlantic Ocean via Donegal Bay
- Length: 24.54 km (15.25 mi)
- Basin size: 80.8 km^{2} (31.2 sq mi)
- Discharge
  - average: 0.16 m^{3}/s (5.7 cu ft/s)

The River Eske (Irish: Abhainn na hIascaí; also Eask) is a river in County Donegal, Ireland. It begins at Lough Eske in the southeast of the county before flowing mainly westwards to the town of Donegal and into the Atlantic Ocean via Donegal Bay.

Donegal Town is the only major settlement through which it flows. Despite its size, the river is well known for fishing, especially for spring salmon, sea trout and char, with the season running from 1 March to 30 September.

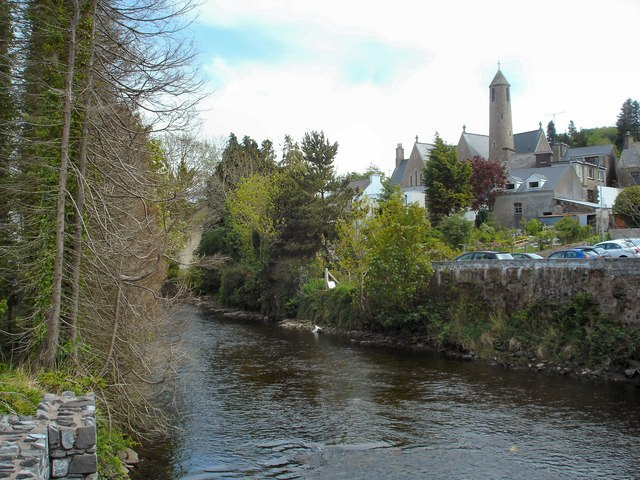
River Eske flowing through Donegal Town.

The river flows in the Bluestack Mountains, which are to the north of Donegal Town. On the north-eastern edge of Donegal Town, the Drumenny Burn flows into the River Eske beside the Community Hospital. In the town, the Eske passes several tourist attractions, one of which is Donegal Castle, the former seat of the O'Donnell Clan, the ancient rulers of the Lordship of Tyrconnell (roughly similar to modern day County Donegal). The mouth of the river is directly opposite a former Franciscan Abbey which was built by the O'Donnells but was destroyed by the English following the Flight of the Earls in 1607.

== Bridges ==
Almost as soon as the river parts from Lough Eske, it is crossed by Lough Eske Bridge; the river then flows in a southwest direction towards Donegal Town with the next crossing some two kilometres (1.2 miles) down stream at what is called Thrushbank Bridge; it continues southwestwards and is crossed by the N56 section of the Donegal Town By-pass by a new concrete bridge.

From this new bridge it heads southwards, were the smaller Drumenny Burn joins it at a spot between the Community Hospital and The Northern Garage. After this, the Eske heads westwards into the town, flowing past the Community Hospital. The river also flows through three bridges in the actual town: the first and newest of the bridges is at Water Street; there have been several bridges at this site since at least the 1830s which included wooden and concrete structures. The current bridge at this site is called Kennedy Bridge and was erected in 2004. From Water Street the Eske flows westwards and is bridged at Tyrconnell Street; this bridge is known as the 'Iron Bridge' for self-explanatory reasons and was originally constructed in 1895, although drawings show a bridge at the site from earlier in the century. This bridge is called Tyrconnell Bridge, and was largely rebuilt in late 2018 and very early 2019. The river finally flows southwards to Bridge Street; this is a three arched bridge originally constructed in between 1835 and 1840 and is now on the Record of Protected Structures as of 2003. This bridge is close to the site of the original crossing of the river. After this final bridge, the river meets with the sea, flowing into Donegal Harbour, an inlet of Donegal Bay.

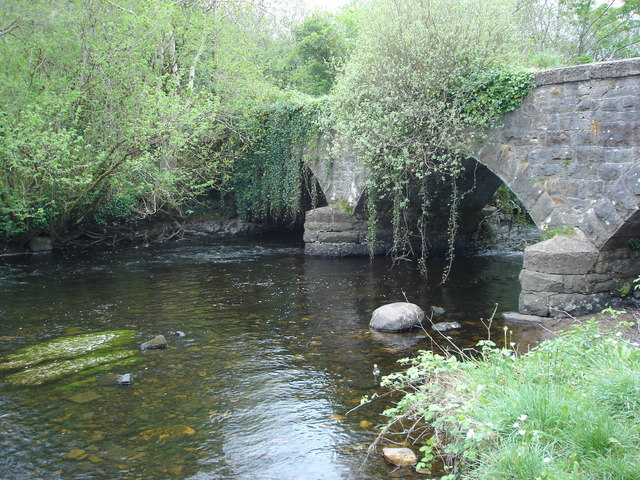
County Donegal Railway bridge over the Eske.

== See also ==
- List of rivers of Ireland
