= Lough Mourne =

Lake in County Donegal, Ireland

- Loch Moirne (Irish)
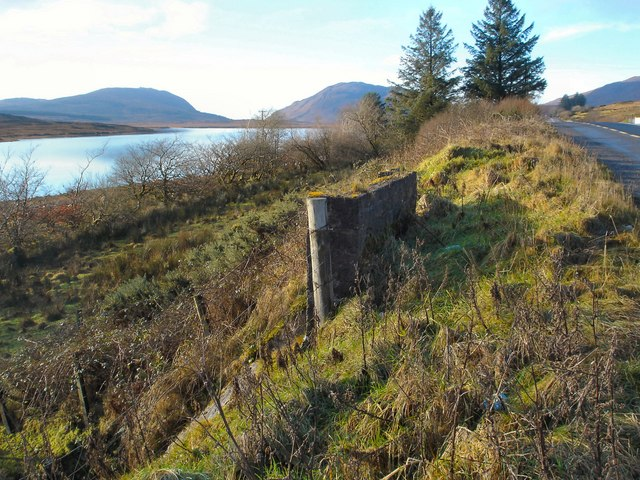
- With Barnesmore Gap in background

- Location in Ireland
- Location: County Donegal
- Coordinates: 54°45′1″N 7°54′2″W
- Lake type: reservoir
- Primary outflows: Mourne Beg River
- Catchment area: 8.87 km^{2} (3.4 sq mi)
- Basin countries: Ireland
- Max. length: 1.7 km (1 mi)
- Max. width: 0.5 km (0.3 mi)
- Surface area: 0.67 km^{2} (0.26 sq mi)
- Average depth: 3.9 m (13 ft)
- Max. depth: 11.9 m (39 ft)
- Surface elevation: 168 m (551 ft)

Lough Mourne (Irish: Loch Moirne) is a freshwater lake in east County Donegal, Ireland, near County Tyrone.

== Geography and hydrology ==
Lough Mourne is located about 9 kilometres (6 mi) southwest of Ballybofey, near the N15 road. The lake serves as a reservoir for Donegal Town. The Mourne Beg River flows out of the southern end of the lough, while the Burn Daurnett flows out of the north-eastern end of the lough. The Red Burn (also known as the Sruhanderg) flows into the western side of the lough.

== Natural history ==
Fish species in Lough Mourne include roach, pike, brown trout and the critically endangered European eel. The southwestern shore of Lough Mourne forms part of the Croaghonagh Bog Special Area of Conservation. The site provides supports for a range of wildlife species including important bird species.

== See also ==
- List of loughs in Ireland
- List of Special Areas of Conservation in the Republic of Ireland
