= Donegal Railway Heritage Centre =

- Ionad Oidhreachta Iarnróid Dhún na nGall
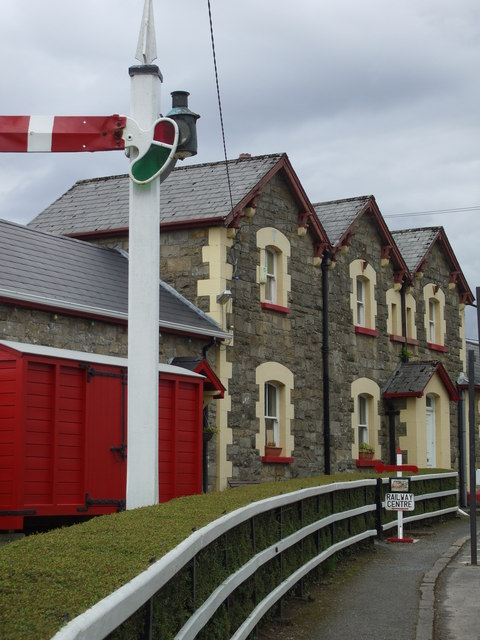

- Location within Ireland
- Location: Tyrconnell Street, Donegal, Ireland
- Coordinates: 54.656949°N 8.108222°W
- Type: railway museum
- Owner: County Donegal Railway Restoration Ltd
- Public transit access: Abbey Hotel bus stop
- Website: donegalrailway.com

The Donegal Railway Heritage Centre commemorates the operations of the County Donegal Railways Committee which operated two narrow-gauge railways in County Donegal from 1863 until 1959. The County Donegal Railway Restoration Society restored the centre, which opened in 1995 and is housed in the old station house of Donegal Railway Station in Donegal Town. Today, it operates as a visitor attraction comprising a museum, information centre and shop. On display are rolling stock, historical artefacts and an audio-visual presentation on the railways’ history.

== Rolling stock ==
The centre owns several items of rolling stock, some awaiting restoration.

- Class 5 Locomotive, "Drumboe" built 1907, already (2021) restored
- Trailer #5, built 1929, undergoing restoration.
- Railcar #15, built 1936, undergoing restoration.
- Restored Series 2 Carriage #28 from 1893.
- Two Non Ventilated Planked Vans one #12 from 19XX and another Unknown.

== See also ==
- List of heritage railways in the Republic of Ireland

== Sources ==
- Website of the County Donegal Railway Restoration Society
- Donegal Town Website
- Heritage Centre web page
- Kits for many of the passenger coaches and locomotives are produced by Worsley Works - website
