= Blue Stack Mountains =

Mountain range in Ireland

- Irish: na Cruacha Gorma
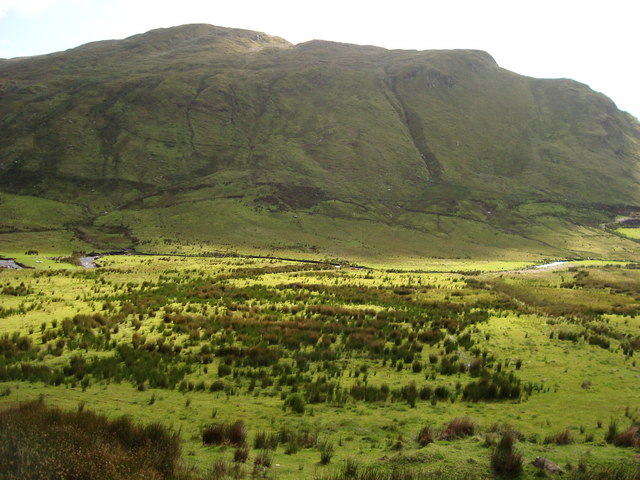
- Binnasruell in the Blue Stack Mountains

Highest point
- Peak: Croaghgorm
- Elevation: 674 m (2,211 ft)
- Coordinates: 54°45′27″N 7°58′17″W

Geography
- Location within Ireland
- Country: Ireland
- Province: Ulster
- County: Donegal
- Range coordinates: 54°44′51″N 8°05′36″W

The Blue Stack Mountains or Bluestack Mountains, also called the Croaghgorms (Irish: na Cruacha Gorma, meaning 'the blue stacks'), are the major mountain range in the south of County Donegal, Ireland. They provide a barrier between the south of the county, such as Donegal Town and Ballyshannon, and the towns to the north and west such as Dungloe and Letterkenny. The road between the two parts of the county goes through the Barnesmore Gap.

The highest mountain in the range is Croaghgorm, which is 674 metres (2,211 ft) high. Nearby summits include Ardnageer (642 m [2,106 ft], Croaghanirwore (548 m [1,798 ft]), Croaghbarnes (499 m [1,637 ft]), Croaghblane (641 m [2,103 ft]), Croaghnageer (571 m [1,873 ft]), Croveenananta (476 m [1,562 ft]), Gaugin Mountain (565 m [1,854 ft]), Lacroagh (403 m [1,322 ft]), Lavagh More (671 m [2,201 ft]) and Lavagh Beg (650 m [2,130 ft]). Silver Hill (600 m [2,000 ft]), is the smallest mountain in Ireland to meet the 600 m threshold for a Simms classification.

== Gallery ==
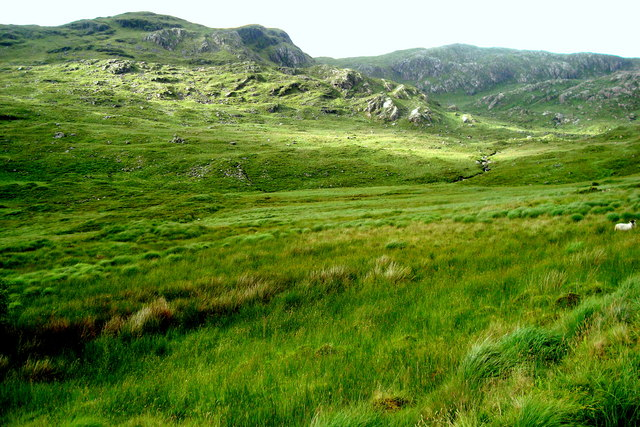
Eglish Valley

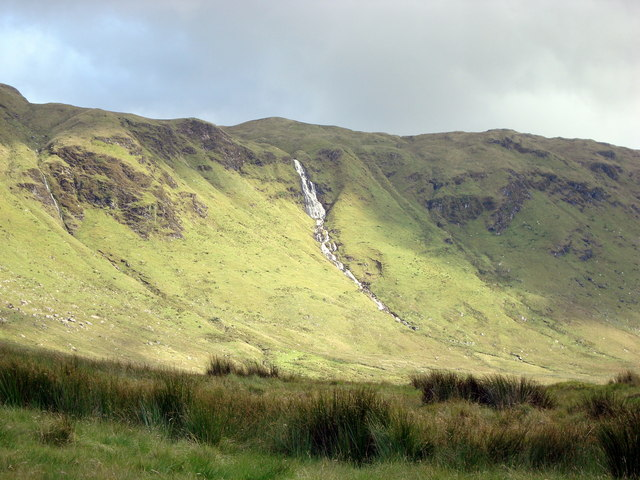
Binnasruell

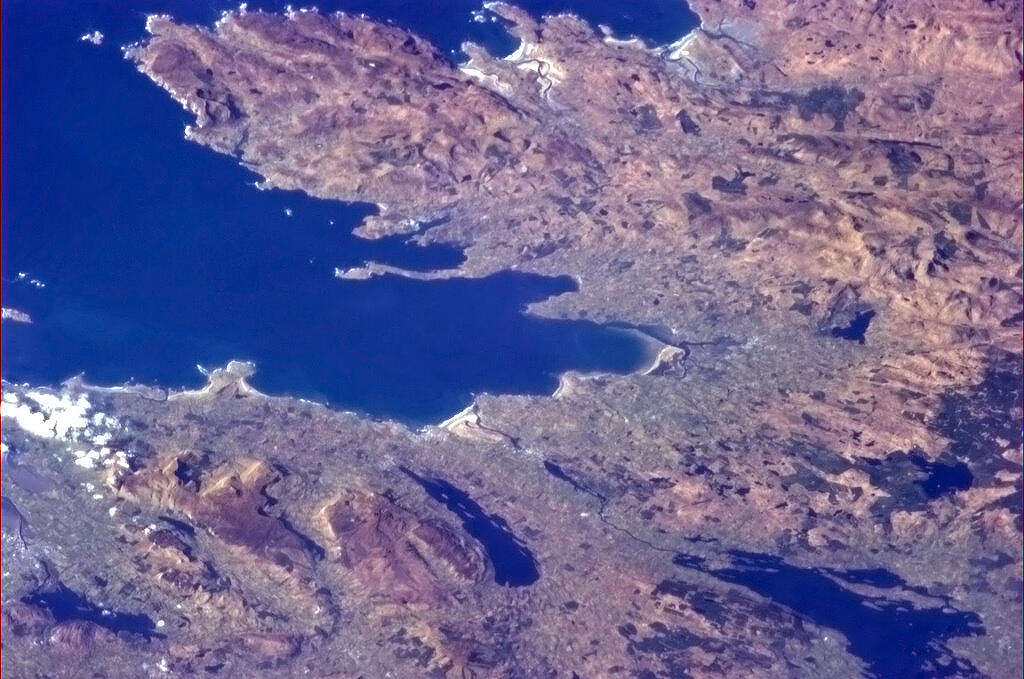
The Blue Stacks from earth orbit (top right)
