= Barnesmore Gap =

Mountain gap

Coordinates: 54.72208°N 7.94812°W

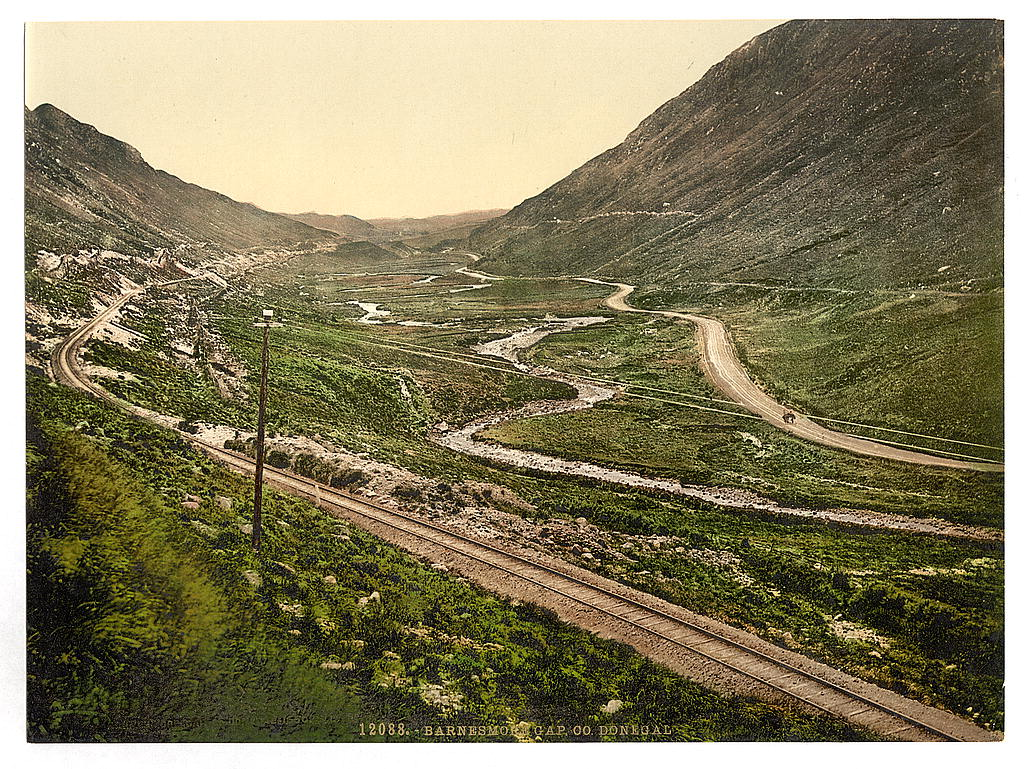
Barnesmore Gap, c. 1890

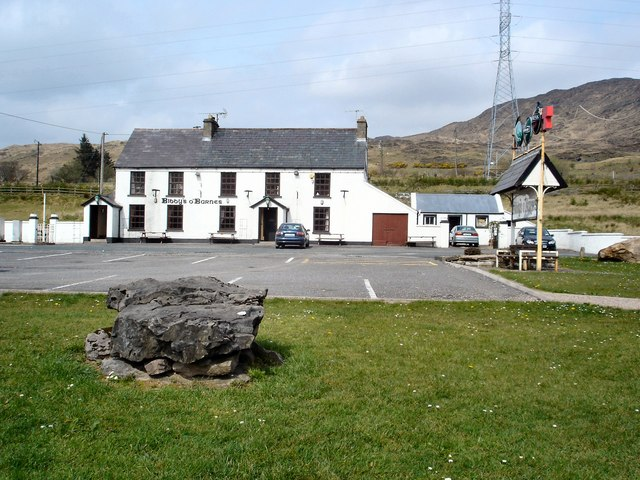
Biddy's pub, Barnesmore Gap.

Barnesmore Gap (Irish: An Bearnas Mór, meaning 'the big gap') is a mountain pass or gap (elevation 117 m) situated in the Bluestack Mountains, County Donegal, Ireland. The main Donegal to Ballybofey road, the N15, and route of the former County Donegal Railway run through Barnesmore gap, acting as the main route between south and north Donegal. It is an area of complex geology, but its main feature is granite formed in the Devonian period, 400million years ago. The gap held glaciers in the Last Glacial Period flowing to the Atlantic through what is now Donegal Bay, up to about 13000 years ago. According to a 17th-century Hiberno-Latin history of Donegal Abbey, the Gap of Barnesmore was once home to a large population of wild red deer.

The narrow gauge railway line was originally the West Donegal Railway which subsequently became part of the network managed by the County Donegal Railways Joint Committee. The company pioneered the use of diesel rail-cars which ran through the gap up to the late 1950s, connecting Stranorlar in the east to Donegal Town, and through to Killybegs in the west.
