= West Donegal Railway =

- Founded: 1860
- Defunct: 1892
- Fate: Merged with the Finn Valley Railway
- Successor: Donegal Railway Company
- Headquarters: Stranorlar; Donegal Town, Ireland
- Area served: County Donegal

The West Donegal Railway (WDR) was a 3 ft (914 mm) narrow gauge railway in Ireland.

== History ==
West Donegal Railway Act 1879
- Act of Parliament
- Parliament of the United Kingdom
- Long title: An Act tor making a Railway from the Finn Valley Railway, near the Town of Stranorlar, in the County of Donegal, to the Town of Donegal, in the same County, and for other purposes.
- Citation: 42 & 43 Vict. c. clxxix

Dates
- Royal assent: 21 July 1879

Text of statute as originally enacted

The Finn Valley Railway had reached Stranorlar in 1863. The West Donegal Railway Company was incorporated by the West Donegal Railway Act 1879 (42 & 43 Vict. c. clxxix) of July 1879 to extend the Finn Valley Railway line south west to Donegal, a distance of 18 miles in length.

Although nominally a separate company, the chairman was James Hewitt, 4th Viscount Lifford, who was also chairman of the Finn Valley Railway. The economic prospects for the line were not substantial so the decision was taken to build the line to 3 ft (914 mm) narrow gauge.

Construction started on 1 August 1880, and with difficulties in raising finance was opened on 25 April 1882, 4 miles short of Donegal. It took another 7 years before the last 4 miles into Donegal could be constructed, opening in September 1889.

Three tank engines were obtained from Sharp, Stewart and Company, named Alice, Blanche and Lydia.

In 1892, it merged with the Finn Valley Railway into a new company, the Donegal Railway Company.

== Surviving vehicles ==
- Carriage no. 1 built in 1882 by the Birmingham Railway Carriage and Wagon Company preserved at the Ulster Folk and Transport Museum, Cultra, County Down.

== Gallery ==
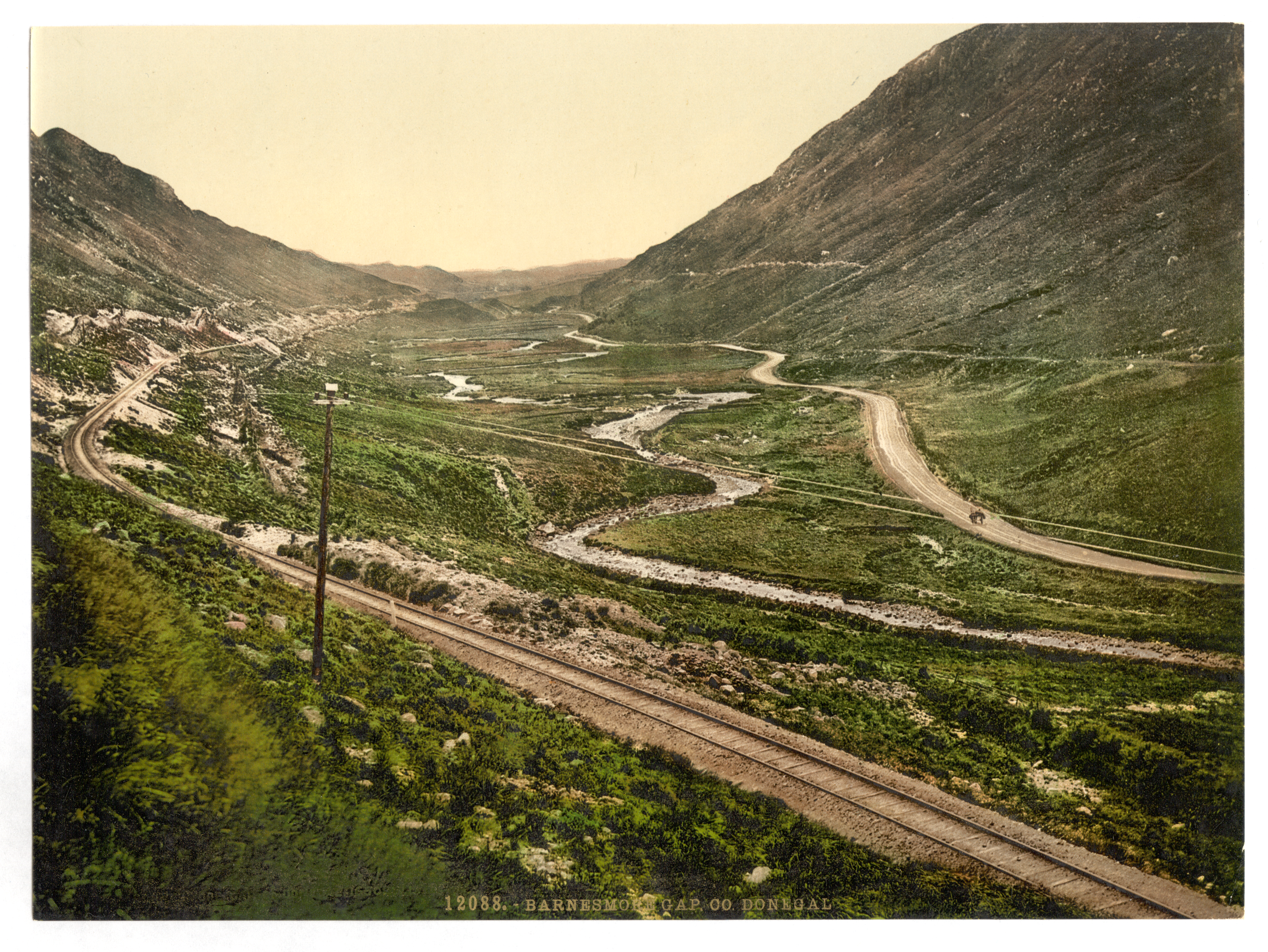
The Barnesmore Gap with the railway.

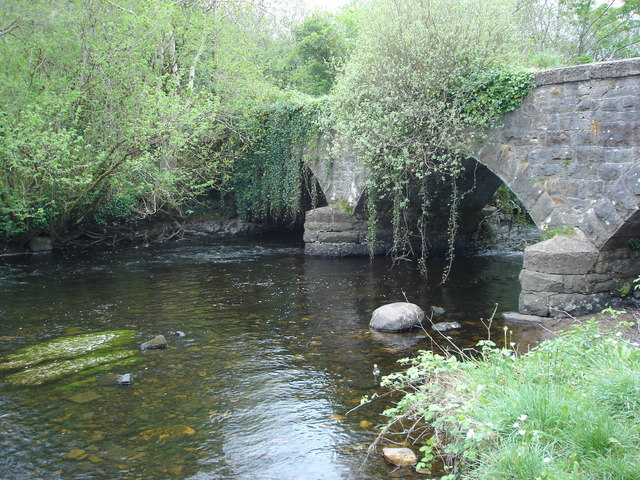
Bridge spanning the River Eske.

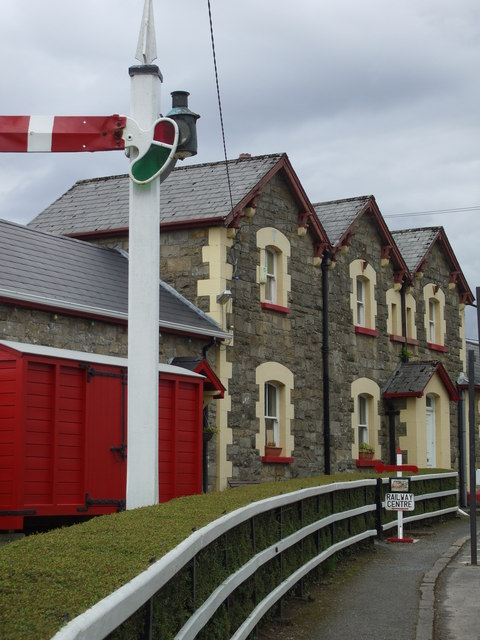
The railway station in Donegal which is also the Donegal Railway Heritage Centre.
