= Finn Valley Railway =

Railway in Ireland

Overview
- Stations called at: 6
- Headquarters: Stranorlar, Ireland
- Reporting mark: FVR
- Locale: County Donegal, County Tyrone
- Dates of operation: October 1, 1863–1892
- Successor: Donegal Railway Company

Technical
- Track gauge: 3 ft (914 mm)
- Previous gauge: 5 ft 3 in (1,600 mm) (Irish gauge)

The Finn Valley Railway (FVR) was a 5 ft 3 in (1,600 mm) gauge railway in Ireland.

== History ==
=== Incorporation ===
Finn Valley Railway Act 1860
- Act of Parliament
- Parliament of the United Kingdom
- Long title: An Act for making a Railway from Stranorlar in the County of Donegal to the Londonderry and Enniskillen Railway near Strabane in the County of Tyrone, and for other Purposes.
- Citation: 23 & 24 Vict. c. xl

Dates
- Royal assent: 15 May 1860

Text of statute as originally enacted

Finn Valley Railway Act 1871
- Act of Parliament
- Parliament of the United Kingdom
- Long title: An Act to grant further powers to the Finn Valley Railway Company with respect to their Undertaking.
- Citation: 34 & 35 Vict. c. cxxv

Dates
- Royal assent: 13 July 1871

Text of statute as originally enacted

The Finn Valley Railway Company was incorporated by the Finn Valley Railway Act 1860 (23 & 24 Vict. c. xl) on 15 May 1860 with capital of £60,000 (equivalent to £7,120,000 in 2023).

=== Personnel ===
The Chairman of the directors was The 4th Viscount Lifford, whose seat was Meenglass Castle, just south-east of Ballybofey, and the Deputy-Chairman was James Thompson Macky of the Bank of Ireland in Derry.

The other directors were:

- Robert Collum, 1 Chester Place, Hyde Park Square, London
- Edward Hunter, The Glebe, Blackheath, Kent
- Maurice Ceely Maude, Lenaghan, Enniskillen
- Sir Samuel Hercules Hayes, 4th Baronet, Leuaghan, Stranorlar
- Robert Russell, Salthill, Mountcharles
- Major Humphreys, Milltown House, Strabane

The other offices of the company were:

- James Alex Ledlie, Stranorlar, Secretary
- Peter W. Barlow, 26 Great George Street, Westminster, Consulting Engineer
- John Bower, Engineer

=== Opening ===
A 5 ft 3 in (1,600 mm) gauge rail line between Stranorlar and Strabane was opened on 1 October 1863.

=== Operation ===
The directors entered into a contract with the Irish North Western Railway to work the line for a period of 10 years. This company became amalgamated with the Great Northern Railway (Ireland) in 1876.

=== Merger and gauge conversion ===
In 1892, the line merged with the West Donegal Railway into a new company, the Donegal Railway Company. The line from Stranorlar to Strabane was reconstructed to (3 ft (914 mm)) gauge shortly afterwards.
