= Donegal Railway =

Overview
- Headquarters: Stranorlar, Donegal
- Dates of operation: 27 June 1892–1 May 1906
- Predecessors: Finn Valley Railway, West Donegal Railway
- Successor: County Donegal Railways Joint Committee

Technical
- Track gauge: 3 ft (914 mm)
- Previous gauge: 5 ft 3 in (1,600 mm)

The Donegal Railway (DR) was a 3 ft (914 mm) gauge railway in Ireland.

== History ==
Donegal Railway Act 1892
- Act of Parliament
- Parliament of the United Kingdom
- Long title: An Act for the Amalgamation of the Undertakings of the Finn Valley Railway Company and the West Donegal Railway Company and for other purposes.
- Citation: 55 & 56 Vict. c. clxi

Dates
- Royal assent: 27 June 1892

Donegal Railway Act 1893
- Act of Parliament
- Parliament of the United Kingdom
- Long title: An Act to authorise the Donegal Railway Company to extend their Railway to Strabane to alter the gauge of a portion of their railway and for other purposes.
- Citation: 56 & 57 Vict. c. clx

Dates
- Royal assent: 27 July 1893

Text of statute as originally enacted

Donegal Railway Act 1896
- Act of Parliament
- Parliament of the United Kingdom
- Long title: An Act to authorise the Donegal Railway Company to extend their Railway from Strabane to Londonderry and from Donegal to Ballyshannon to make agreements with the Londonderry Port and Harbour Commissioners and the Londonderry Bridge Commissioners and for other purposes.
- Citation: 59 & 60 Vict. c. ccxxii

Dates
- Royal assent: 7 August 1896

Text of statute as originally enacted

Donegal Railway Act 1900
- Act of Parliament
- Parliament of the United Kingdom
- Long title: An Act to divide the separate undertaking authorised by the Donegal Railway Act 1896 into two separate undertakings to extend the time for the purchase o£ lands and completion of works by that Act authorised to provide for the granting of rebates in favour of the railway from Donegal to Ballyshannon to release the County Council of the County of Donegal from their liability under the West Donegal Light Railway Order and for other purposes.
- Citation: 63 & 64 Vict. c. cxiii

Dates
- Royal assent: 30 July 1900

Text of statute as originally enacted

Donegal Railway Act 1902
- Act of Parliament
- Parliament of the United Kingdom
- Long title: An Act for attaching a preference to the capital to be issued for the Ballyshannon Extension for the consolidation and conversion of the capital of the Company to repeal the provisions of former Acts as to separate undertakings to further extend the time for the completion of the Ballyshannon Extension to authorise the Company to work its undertaking by electricity and for other purposes.
- Citation: 2 Edw. 7. c. xxix

Dates
- Royal assent: 28 April 1902

Donegal Railway Act 1904
- Act of Parliament
- Parliament of the United Kingdom
- Long title: An Act to authorize the Donegal Railway Company to raise further Moneys by the creation and issue of Guaranteed Preference Stock for the purpose amongst others of completing the Ballyshannon Extension and to empower the Company to own and work Motor Cars and other Vehicles and for other purposes.
- Citation: 4 Edw. 7. c. lxvii

Dates
- Royal assent: 22 July 1904

Text of statute as originally enacted

The company was formed via the Donegal Railway Act 1892 (55 & 56 Vict. c. clxi) on 27 June 1892 by a merger of the Finn Valley Railway and the West Donegal Railway.

One of the first acts of the new company was to convert the former Finn Valley Railway from Strabane to Stranorlar from 5 ft 3 in (1,600 mm) to 3 ft (914 mm) gauge, which it completed on 16 July 1894.

Further new lines were built with a government grant of £300,000 (equivalent to £33,000,000 in 2025),:

- Stranorlar and Glenties 24 miles (39 km), opened 1895 (stations: Stranorlar, Ballybofey, Glenmore, Cloghan, Ballinamore, Fintown, Shallogans and Glenties)
- Donegal Town to Killybegs 19 miles (31 km), opened 1893 (stations: Donegal Town, Killymard, Mountcharles, Doorin Road, Inver, Port, Dunkineely, Bruckless, Ardara Road and Killybegs)

Other extensions followed later:

- Strabane to Derry 14 miles (23 km), opened 1901 (stations: Strabane, Ballymagorry, Ballyheather, Donemana, Cullion, New Buildings and Derry Victoria Road)
- Donegal Town to Ballyshannon 16 miles (26 km), was the last section to be completed and opened 2 September 1905 (stations: Donegal Town, Hospital Halt, Drumbar, Laghey, Bridgetown, Ballintra, Dromore Halt, Dorrian's Bridge Halt, Rossnowlagh, Friary Halt, Coolmore, Creevy, Legalton Halt and Ballyshannon)

In 1906 it was obtained by the joint interest of the Great Northern Railway of Ireland and the Midland Railway Northern Counties Committee which set up a new company, the County Donegal Railways Joint Committee, under the Great Northern (Ireland) and Midland Railways Act 1906 (6 Edw. 7. c. clxxxiii).
