= Stranorlar =

Town in County Donegal, Ireland

Stranorlar Srath an Urláir (Irish)
- Town
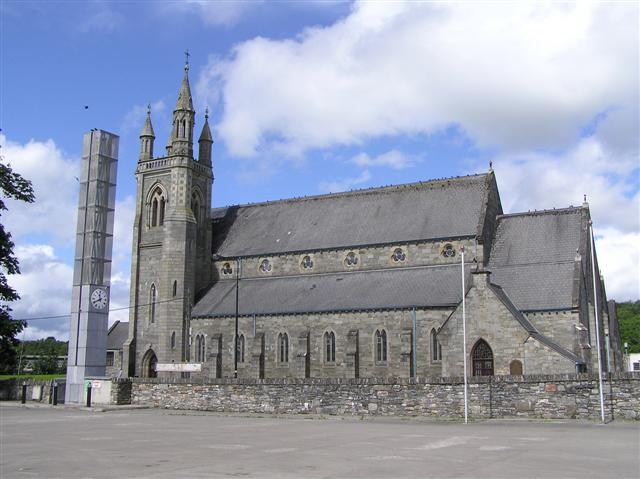
- Stranorlar's Roman Catholic church

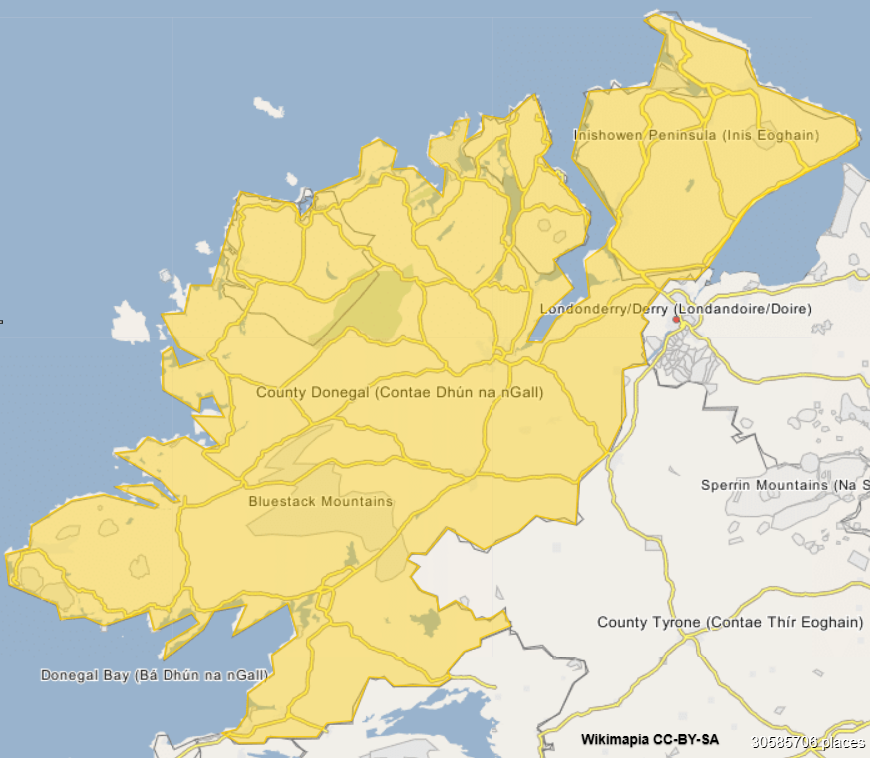
- Location in Ireland Stranorlar (Ireland)
- Coordinates: 54°48′00″N 7°47′24″W
- Country: Ireland
- Province: Ulster
- County: County Donegal
- Elevation: 30 m (98 ft)
- Time zone: UTC+0 (WET)
  - Summer (DST): UTC+1 (IST (WEST))
- Eircode routing key: F93
- Irish Grid Reference: H194946
- Website: www.ballybofeystranorlar.com

Stranorlar (Irish: Srath an Urláir) is a town, townland and civil parish in the Finn Valley of County Donegal, in Ireland. Stranorlar and Ballybofey (located on the other side of the River Finn) form the twin towns of Ballybofey–Stranorlar.

== History ==
=== Built heritage ===
Evidence of ancient settlement in the area includes a number of ring fort and holy well sites in the townlands of Stranorlar, Mullandrait, Lough Hill and Admiran. Stranorlar's Church of Ireland church, St John's Church in Glebe townland, was built c. 1729. Isaac Butt (1813–1879), founder of the Home Rule movement, is buried in its churchyard.

=== Drumboe killings ===
In November 1922, during the Irish Civil War, a column of Anti-Treaty IRA irregulars from the 2nd Northern Division were captured at Dunlewey in west Donegal by the National Army and held in Drumboe Castle outside Stranorlar. On 14 March 1923, they were taken from the castle to the nearby Drumboe woods and summarily executed.

There is a memorial to the four men on Stranorlar's main street and, since 1924, there has been a commemoration march to the monument each year by republicans. The four executed men were:

- Charlie Daly (26), from Knockaunacoolteen, Firies, County Kerry;
- Daniel Enright (23), from Patrick Street, Listowel, County Kerry;
- Timothy O'Sullivan (23), Patrick Street, Listowel, County Kerry;
- Seán Larkin (26), Ballagherty, Magherafelt, County Londonderry.

== Transport ==
The town is located at the junction of the N15 and N13 national primary roads. For nearly 100 years, Stranorlar was the headquarters of the County Donegal Railway system (originally the Finn Valley Railway), with services to Derry and Letterkenny via Strabane (near Lifford), to Ballyshannon and Killybegs via Donegal, and to Glenties. At its peak, the railway had 130 employees. The last train ran from Stranorlar in 1960. As of the 21st century, the nearest operational railway station is the Northern Ireland Railways station, Derry~Londonderry railway station, in Derry.

Stranorlar railway station was built by the Finn Valley Railway and opened in September 1863 and closed on 6 February 1960. The old railway station was demolished to make way for a new bus garage owned and run by Bus Éireann. As part of a series of millennium celebrations, the old clock from the railway station was restored and installed in a new clock tower which sits at the old pedestrian entrance to the railway station yard. The town is one of the two Bus Éireann depots in County Donegal.

The town is served by the Bus Éireann No. 64 (Derry/Galway) service which connects the town to Donegal Town, Ballyshannon, Bundoran, Sligo and Letterkenny. There is also a regular service to Lifford and Strabane. TFI Local Link routes 264 (Ballyshannon/Letterkenny), 288 (Ballybofey/Derry), 290 (Ballybofey/Letterkenny), 988 (Cloghan/Letterkenny) also service the area.

== Education ==
Stranorlar is home to St. Columba's College and Finn Valley College. The town is also home to two primary schools: St Mary's primary school, and Robertson National School.

== Religion ==
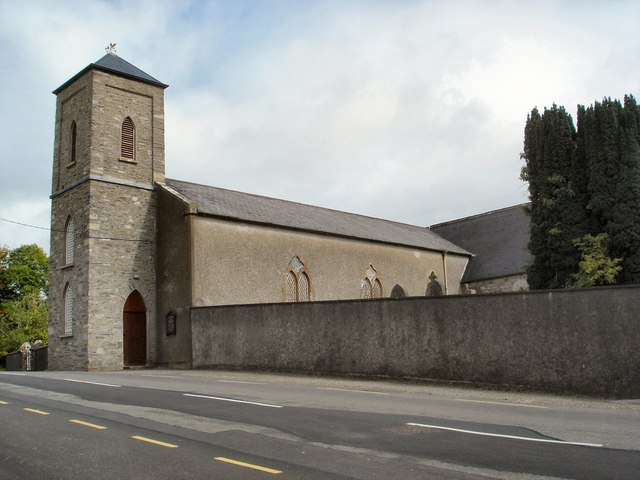
Church of Ireland church in Stranorlar

The town's Church of Ireland church, St John's Church, was built in the 18th century. The Catholic church, the Church of Mary Immaculate, was built c. 1860 and is included in the Record of Protected Structures maintained by Donegal County Council. The Reformed Presbyterian Church of Ireland church and Presbyterian church are also included in the Record of Protected Structures.

== Sport ==
The local athletics club, Finn Valley Athletics Club, has a track in the town. Stranorlar is home to Finn Valley Rugby Club.

The Ballybofey and Stranorlar Golf Club is an 18-hole golf course in the area, and game angling occurs in the River Finn.

== Tourism ==
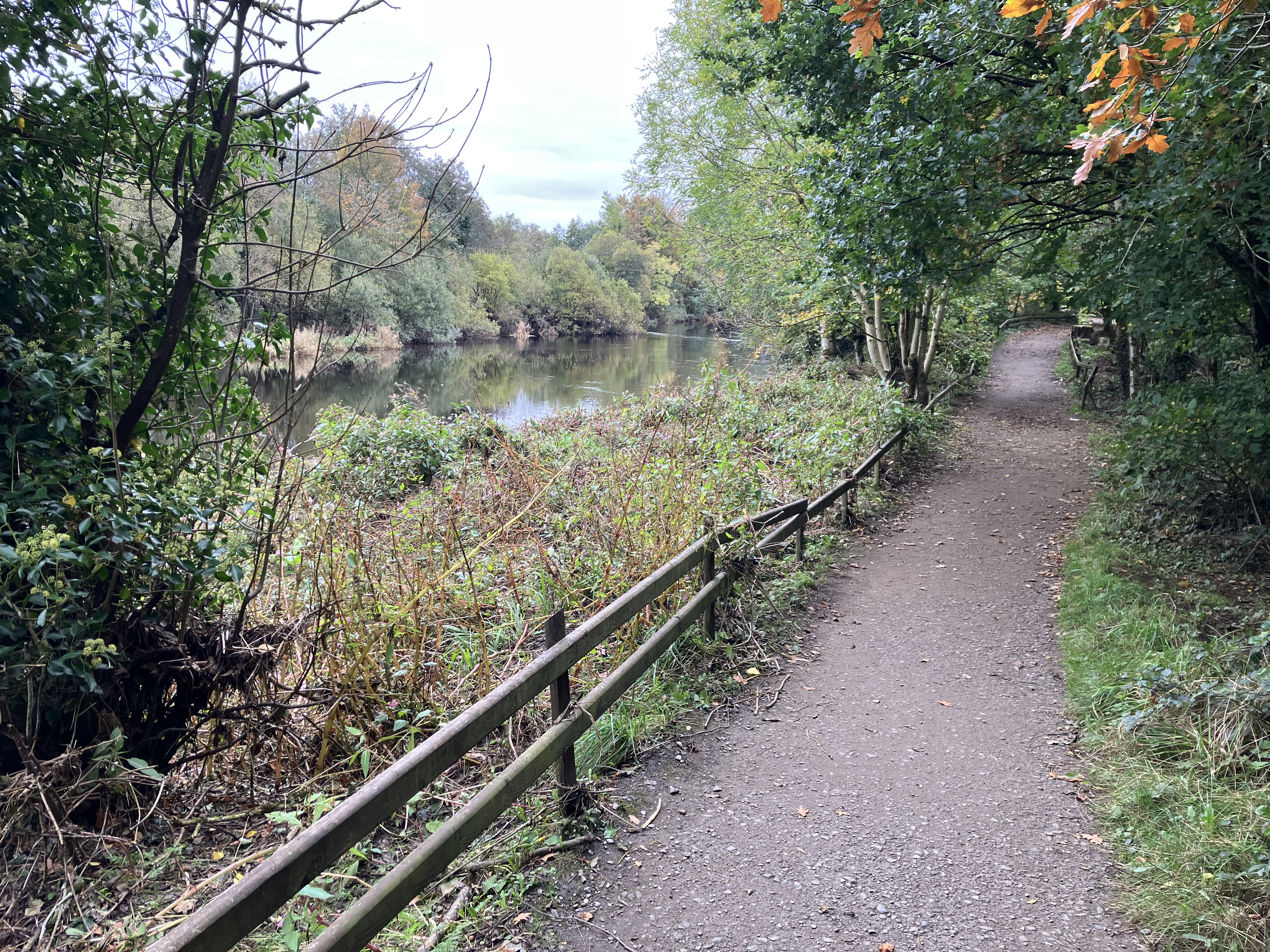
Walking trail beside the River Finn in Drumboe Woods

Drumboe Woods are a tourist attraction at Stranorlar. According to local historian Pat Holland, Edmund Samuel Hayes and his wife Lady Emily Hayes, who lived at Drumboe Castle, began the planting of Drumboe Woods in the 1850s or 1860s. This included the Giant Redwood, which stands at the center of the woods. The woods are managed by Coillte and provide walking routes along the banks of the River Finn and the upper woods. The woods also contain the ruins of Drumboe Castle.

Outside the town, a small folly called "The Steeple" is a destination for walkers. From the top of the tower, on a clear day, the hillfort of the Grianan of Aileach can be seen. There is a raised ring fort at Dunwiley, outside the town.

Since 2021, the Frances Browne Literary Festival has been an annual event in Stranorlar and Ballybofey. The festival, which takes place in October, “celebrates the rich cultural and literary heritage of East Donegal.” It includes lectures, dramatic and musical performances, and a multilingual poetry competition, with awards for poems in English, Irish, and Ulster Scots. Recent guests have included Annemarie Ní Churreáin and Nessa O'Mahony.

== Notable people ==
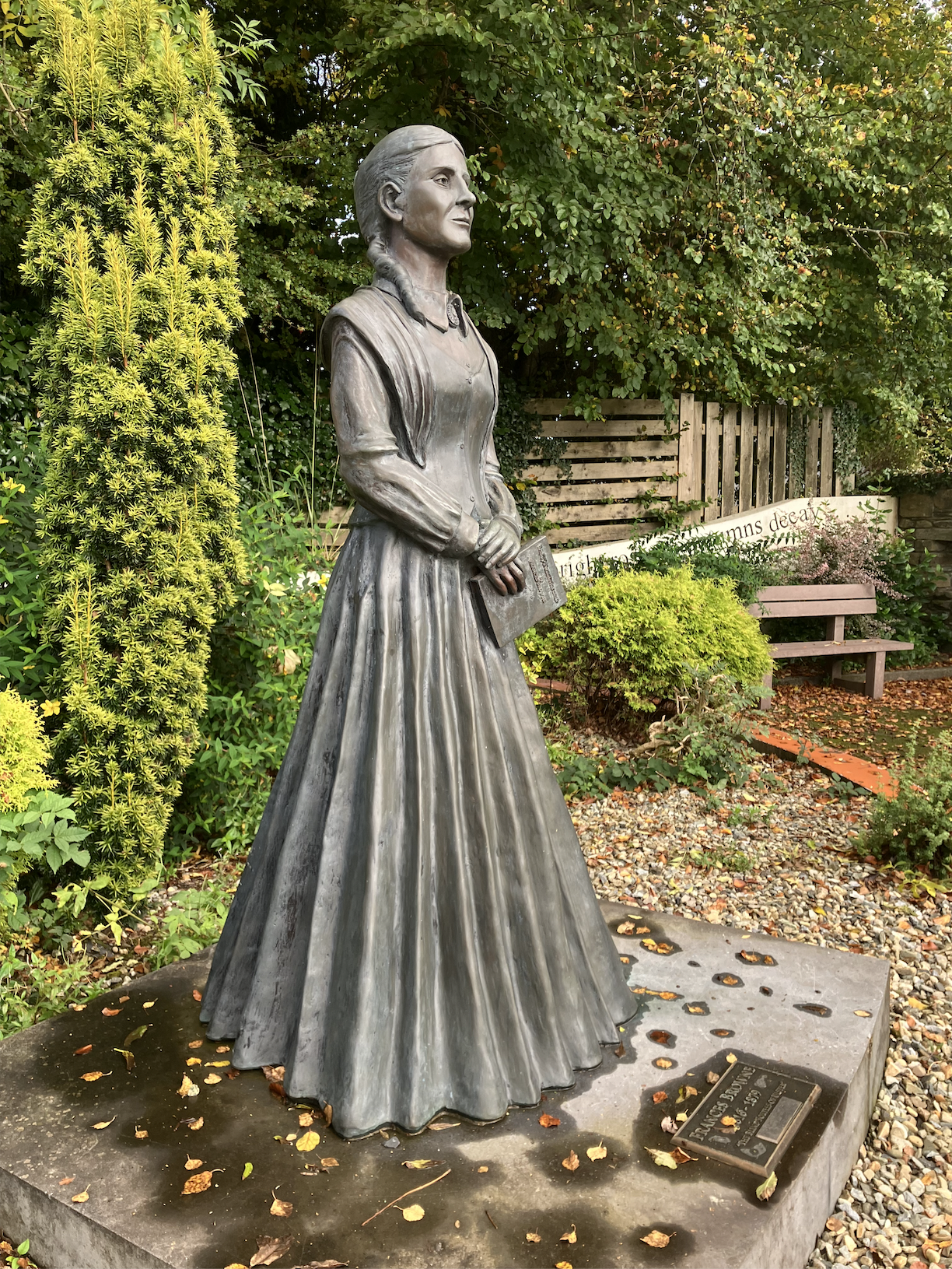
Frances Browne statue in the Pound, Stranorlar

- Peter Benson, builder and architect, who laid out the new town of Stranorlar
- James Boyle, MP
- Frances Browne, poet and novelist
- Redmond Gallagher, racing driver
- Martin Griffin, Gaelic footballer
- Edmund Samuel Hayes, baronet and MP for County Donegal
- Seán McCool, former chief-of-staff of the Irish Republican Army
- Helen O'Clery, writer
- Jason Quigley, boxer

== See also ==
- List of towns and villages in Ireland
- Stranorlar County Mother & Baby Home
