= County Donegal Railways Joint Committee =

Former railway company in Ireland

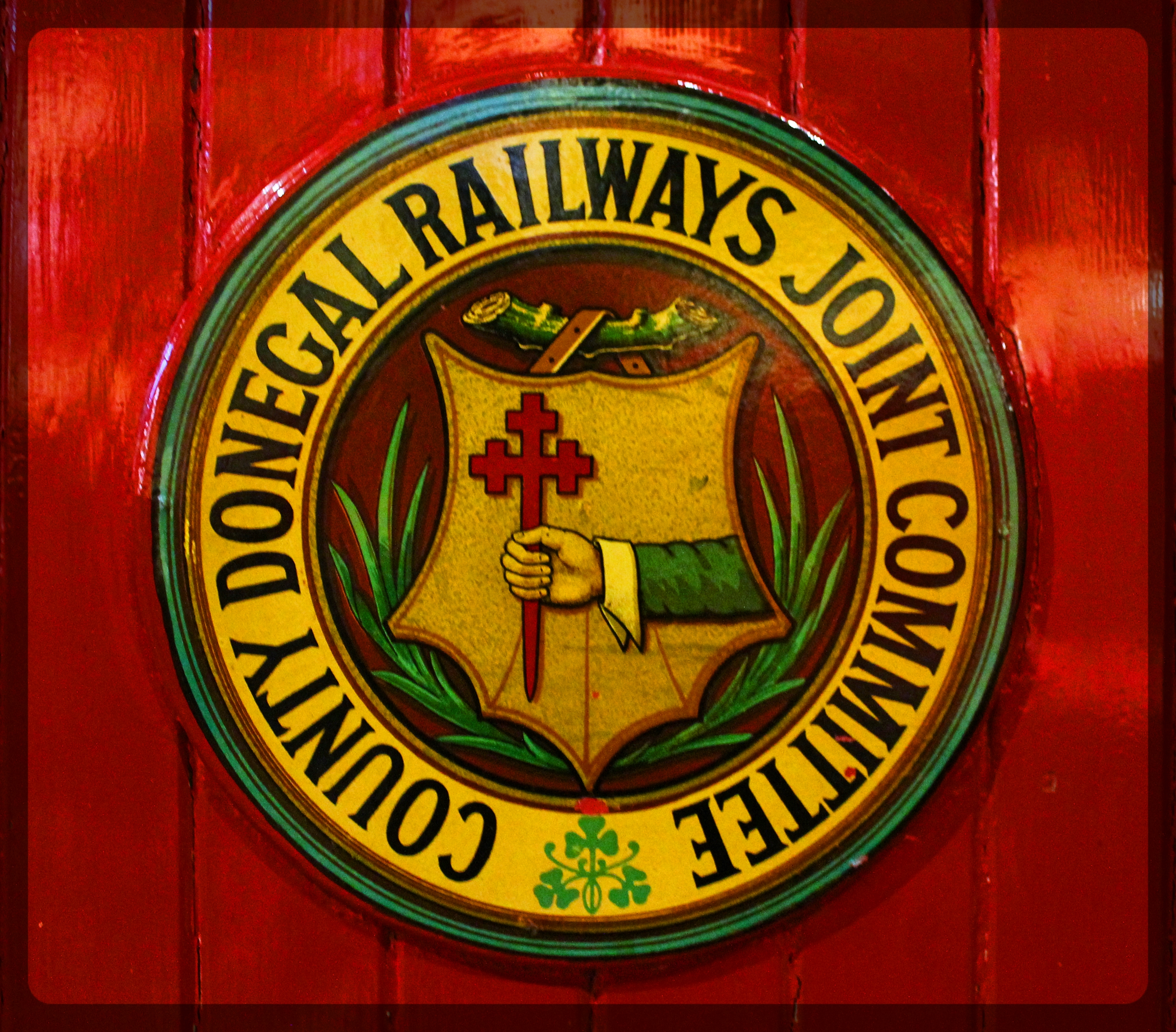
- Crest of the County Donegal Railway Joint Committee
- Lines owned by CDRJC; Lines worked by CDRJC but owned by other companies (Note: Strabane–Letterkenny owned by Strabane and Letterkenny Railway. Strabane–Derry owned by Northern Counties Committee.)

Overview
- Headquarters: Stranorlar
- Key people: Henry Forbes, Bernard L. Curran
- Dates of operation: 1 May 1906–31 December 1959
- Predecessor: Donegal Railway Company
- Successor: CIÉ

Technical
- Track gauge: 3 ft (914 mm)
- Length: 124.5 miles (200.4 km)

The County Donegal Railways Joint Committee (CDRJC) operated an extensive 3 ft (914 mm) narrow gauge railway system serving County Donegal, Ireland, from 1906 until 1960. The committee was incorporated by an act of Parliament in 1906, which authorised the joint purchase of the then Donegal Railway Company by the Great Northern Railway of Ireland and the Midland Railway Northern Counties Committee.

== History ==
Great Northern (Ireland) and Midland Railways Act 1906
- Act of Parliament
- Parliament of the United Kingdom
- Long title: An Act to provide for the vesting of the undertaking of the Donegal Railway Company in the Midland Railway Company and in a Joint Committee of that Company and the Great Northern Railway Company (Ireland) to incorporate such Joint Committee and to transfer to that committee certain of the powers of the Great Northern Railway Company (Ireland) in connexion with the undertaking of the Strabane and Letterkenny Railway Company and for other purposes.
- Citation: 6 Edw. 7. c. clxxxiii

Dates
- Royal assent: 4 August 1906

On 1 May 1906, the joint committee was set up by the Great Northern (Ireland) and Midland Railways Act 1906 (6 Edw. 7. c. clxxxiii). The lines inherited by the joint committee totalled 106 miles (171 km) and were:

- Finn Valley Railway (FVR) from Strabane to Stranorlar
- West Donegal Railway line from Stranorlar to Donegal
- The Donegal Railway Company lines between Stranorlar and Glenties, Donegal Town to Killybegs, Strabane to Derry, and Donegal Town to Ballyshannon

By 1912 the company owned the following assets:

- Locomotives and rolling stock: 21 locomotives; 56 passenger vehicles; 304 goods vehicles
- Head offices and locomotive works at Stranorlar

The Strabane to Derry line was completely owned by the Midland Railway Northern Counties Committee, although it was operated by the CDRJC.

At its greatest extent, the County Donegal Railways Committee operated the largest narrow gauge railway system in the British Isles. The railway was affectionately known as the "Wee Donegal".

The joint committee opened the Strabane and Letterkenny Railway on 1 January 1909, bringing the total mileage operated by the company to 124.5 miles (200.4 km). Only 91 miles (146 km) were directly owned by the joint committee, as the Strabane and Letterkenny Railway accounted for 19.25 miles (30.98 km), and 14.5 miles (23.3 km) were property of the Northern Counties Committee.

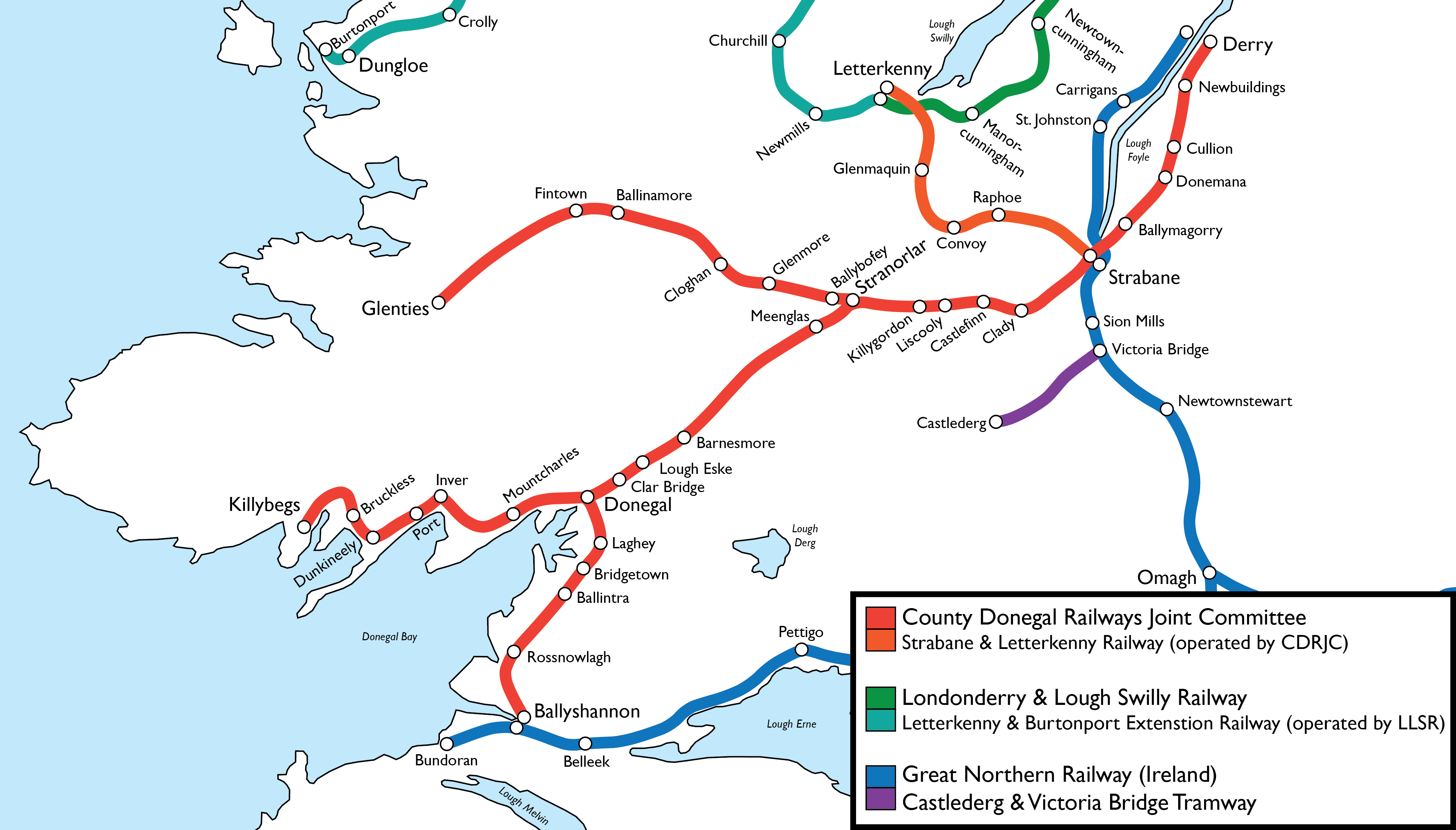
Map of CDRJC and other nearby railways

== Dieselisation ==
Under the management of Henry Forbes, traffic superintendent from 1910 to 1943, the County Donegal Railways became pioneers in the use of diesel traction. The first diesel railcar was built in 1930 (the first diesel railcar anywhere in the British Isles), although a petrol-engined railcar had been built in 1926 before standardisation on diesel traction in 1934. Eight articulated diesel railcars were constructed by Walker Brothers of Wigan between 1934 and 1951, by which time virtually all passenger services were operated by diesel railcar, being much cheaper to operate than conventional steam trains.

The railcars could only be driven from one end and had to be turned on a turntable to make a return journey. As well, they could not be worked in multiple, so if two railcars were working back to back, both required a driver. The railcars were incapable of hauling most freight wagons, so steam traction continued to be used on freight and excursion trains. The railcars could haul specially constructed trailers, and some lightweight freight wagons, which were painted red to distinguish them from the heavier wagons, which were grey. A diesel locomotive named Phoenix (converted from a steam locomotive) was also used, but due to its noisy operation and slow speed (top speed of 27 mph or 43 km/h), it spent most of its career shunting, travelling 204,577 miles (329,235 km) during its working life.

== Closure and winding up ==
The Glenties branch closed in 1947, the Strabane-Derry line closed in 1954, and the remaining passenger services ended on 31 December 1959. Much of the railway was closed on that date. Goods trains ran between Strabane and Stranorlar until 6 February 1960.

During the 1930s the joint committee began operating a fleet of buses. After the closure of the railway, it continued to operate as a road freight and bus company in order to provide substitute services. It did this independently until 1966, when management of the company was taken over by CIÉ.

In 1961, the two most modern diesel railcars were sold to the Isle of Man Railway.

By the time the railway closed, the joint committee was entirely state owned, albeit by three actors in two countries. The Midland Railway's portion had passed to the London, Midland and Scottish Railway in 1923, which in turn passed to the British Transport Commission (BTC) in 1948. The Great Northern Railway's portion had been inherited by the Great Northern Railway Board (GNRB) in 1953, which itself was jointly owned by the Irish and Northern Irish governments. Although the GNRB ceased to own or operate its own railways in 1958, it continued to exist as a holding company for CDRJC.

An agreement was reached between the British Railways Board (BTC's successor) and Córas Iompair Éireann (CIÉ) in 1967 in which the former agreed to give the latter its portion of CDRJC for the payment of £57,742. When combined with the Irish government's share of GNRB, this effectively gave CIÉ 75% of the company. The final 25% was gained in 1969, when CIÉ acquired the other half of GNRB from the Northern Irish government. The complete transfer of ownership to CIÉ was confirmed by legislation in 1971. Despite the company now having a single owner and no activities, it took until 1981 to dissolve it due to technicalities with pension funds.

== Tourist attraction ==
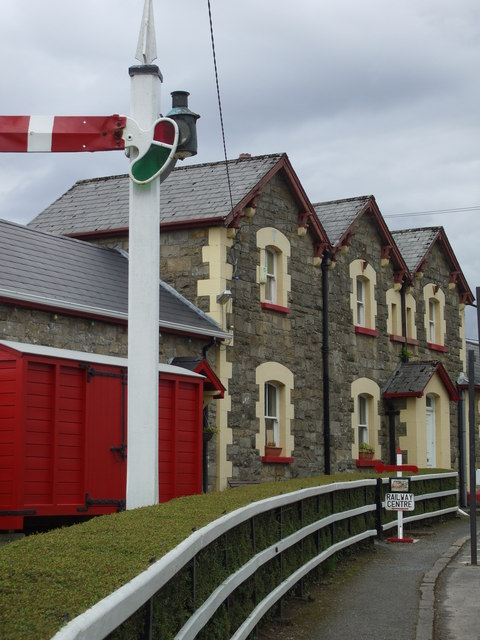
Donegal Railway Heritage Centre in the former station building

Part of the line, which runs alongside Lough Finn near Fintown, has been re-laid as a tourist railway.

The Donegal Railway Heritage Centre has been established and contains historic details and artefacts of the CDRJC.

St. Connell's Museum, in Glenties has an extensive display of items from the railway.

The Foyle Valley Railway in Derry houses numerous CDRJC artefacts. It used to operate a small heritage railway along the Foyle on the original route of the Derry-Portadown railway line, which has since fallen into disrepair during the museum's period of closure.

== Rolling stock ==
Locomotives of the County Donegal Railways Joint Committee
Number	Name	Built	Manufacturer	Configuration	Notes	Image
Class 1
No. 1	Alice	1881	Sharp, Stewart and Company	2-4-0	Loaned to Cork, Blackrock and Passage Railway from 1918-1921. Scrapped 1926.	
No. 2	Blanche	1881	Sharp, Stewart and Company	2-4-0	Withdrawn in 1905. Scrapped in 1909.	Builder's photo of No. 2 Blanche.
No. 3	Lydia	1881	Sharp, Stewart and Company	2-4-0	Withdrawn in 1905. Scrapped in 1910.	
Class 2
No. 4	Meenglas	1893	Neilson and Company	4-6-0	Scrapped in 1935.	Builder's photo of No. 4 Meenglas.
No. 5	Drumboe	1893	Neilson and Company	4-6-0	Withdrawn in 1927. Scrapped in 1931.	
No. 6	Inver	1893	Neilson and Company	4-6-0	Withdrawn in 1927. Scrapped in 1931.	
No. 7	Finn	1893	Neilson and Company	4-6-0	Withdrawn in 1927. Scrapped in 1931.	
No. 8	Foyle	1893	Neilson and Company	4-6-0	Scrapped in 1937.	No. 8 Foyle between Fintown and Glenties in July 1924.
No. 9	Columbkille	1893	Neilson and Company	4-6-0	Scrapped in 1937.	
Class 3
No. 10	Sir James	1902	Neilson and Company	4-4-4	Scrapped in 1935.	Builder's photo of No. 10 Sir James.
No. 11	Hercules	1902	Neilson and Company	4-4-4	Scrapped in 1935.	
Class 4
No. 12 No. 9	Eske	1904	Nasmyth, Wilson and Company	4-6-4	Renumbered No. 9 in 1937. Scrapped in 1954.	
No. 13 No. 10	Owenea	1904	Nasmyth, Wilson and Company	4-6-4	Renumbered No. 10 in 1937. Scrapped in 1952 after a collision with railcar No. 17 in 1949.	No. 10 Owenea at Strabane on 14 May 1937.
No. 14 No. 11	Erne	1904	Nasmyth, Wilson and Company	4-6-4	Renumbered No. 11 in 1937. Scrapped in 1967.	No. 14 Erne.
No. 15 No. 12	Mourne	1904	Nasmyth, Wilson and Company	4-6-4	Renumbered No. 12 in 1937. Withdrawn in 1940, dismantled for spare parts.	
Class 5
No. 16 No. 4	Donegal Meenglas	1907	Nasmyth, Wilson and Company	2-6-4	Renumbered No. 4 and renamed Meenglas in 1937. Preserved at the Foyle Valley Railway Museum.	No. 4 Meenglas in preservation.
No. 17 No. 5	Glenties Drumboe	1907	Nasmyth, Wilson and Company	2-6-4	Renumbered No. 5 and renamed Drumboe in 1937. Ran the last scheduled train of the CDRJC on 31 December 1959. Preserved at the Donegal Railway Heritage Centre.	No. 17 Glenties before renumbering and renaming at Stranorlar on 14 May 1937.
No. 18 No. 6	Killybegs Columbkille	1907	Nasmyth, Wilson and Company	2-6-4	Renumbered No. 6 and renamed Columbkille in 1937. Preserved at the Foyle Valley Railway Museum.	No. 6 Columbkille in preservation.
No. 19	Letterkenny	1908	Nasmyth, Wilson and Company	4-6-2	Dismantled in 1940 for spare parts.	
No. 20 No. 8	Raphoe Foyle	1908	Nasmyth, Wilson and Company	2-6-4	Renumbered No. 8 and renamed Foyle in 1937. Scrapped in 1955.	
Class 5A
No. 21 No. 1	Ballyshannon Alice	1912	Nasmyth, Wilson and Company	2-6-4	Renumbered and renamed to No. 1 Alice in 1928. Sold at a scrap auction in 1960.	No. 1 Alice at Londonderry Victoria Road on 20 August 1950.
No. 2A No. 2	Strabane Blanche	1912	Nasmyth, Wilson and Company	2-6-4	Renumbered and renamed to No. 2 Blanche in 1928. Preserved in the Ulster Folk and Transport Museums in Cultra.	No. 2 Blanche in preservation.
No. 3A No. 3	Stranorlar Lydia	1912	Nasmyth, Wilson and Company	2-6-4	Renumbered and renamed to No. 3 Lydia in 1928. Sold at a scrap auction in 1960.	No. 3 Lydia at Stranorlar on 14 May 1937.
Atkinson-Walker rail tractor
No. 11	Phœnix	1928	Atkinson-Walker	0-4-0	Sold by the Clogher Valley Railway to the CDRJC in December 1931. No. 11 Phœnix was converted from steam power to diesel power and operated as a shunter. Preserved at the Ulster Folk and Transport Museums.	No. 11 Phœnix in preservation.

Railcars of the County Donegal Railways Joint Committee
Number	Start of Operation	Source or Manufacturer	Power	Notes	Image
No. 1	1906	Allday & Onions	Petrol	Preserved in the Ulster Folk and Transport Museums in Cultra.	Railcar No. 1 in preservation.
No. 2	1926	ex-Derwent Valley Light Railway	Petrol	Scrapped in 1934.	Railcar No. 2 at Stranorlar with Henry Forbes (left) and Ross Parks (right).
No. 2	1934	ex-Castlederg and Victoria Bridge Tramway	Petrol	Rebuilt as a trailer in 1944. Sold in 1961 and removed to Mountcharles.	
No. 3	1926	ex-Derwent Valley Light Railway	Petrol	Scrapped in 1934.	
No. 4	1928	O'Doherty	Petrol	Lent to the Clogher Valley Railway in 1932. Scrapped in 1947.	
No. 6	1930	Great Northern Railway (Ireland) and O'Doherty	Petrol	Rebuilt as a trailer in 1945. Sold in 1958 and removed to Inver.	Railcar No. 6 and Railcar No. 7 at Ballintra.
No. 7	1930	Great Northern Railway (Ireland) and O'Doherty	Diesel	First diesel railcar in the British Isles. Scrapped in 1949.	Railcar No. 7 at Stranorlar.
No. 8	1931	Great Northern Railway (Ireland) and O'Doherty	Diesel	Scrapped in 1949.	
No. 9	1933	County Donegal Railways Joint Committee ex-Great Northern Railway (Ireland) bus	Petrol	Scrapped in 1949.	
No. 10	1933	County Donegal Railways Joint Committee	Petrol	Destroyed by a fire in Ballyshannon in 1939.	
No. 10	1942	ex-Clogher Valley Railway and Walker Brothers	Diesel	Preserved at the Ulster Folk and Transport Museums in Cultra.	Railcar No. 10 in preservation.
No. 12	1934	Great Northern Railway (Ireland) and Walker Brothers	Diesel	Preserved at the Foyle Valley Railway.	Railcar No. 12 & No. 18 at the Shane's Castle railway in Antrim.
No. 13	1934	ex-Dublin and Blessington Steam Tramway	Diesel	Rebuilt as a trailer in 1934. Scrapped in 1944.	
No. 14	1935	Great Northern Railway (Ireland) and Walker Brothers	Diesel	Scrapped in 1961.	
No. 15	1936	Great Northern Railway (Ireland) and Walker Brothers	Diesel	Scrapped in 1961.	
No. 16	1936	Great Northern Railway (Ireland) and Walker Brothers	Diesel	Scrapped in 1961.	
No. 17	1938	Great Northern Railway (Ireland) and Walker Brothers	Diesel	Destroyed in collision with No. 10 Owenea in 1949.	
No. 18	1940	Great Northern Railway (Ireland) and Walker Brothers	Diesel	Damaged by fire in 1949. Preserved on the Fintown Railway.	Railcar No. 18 in preservation.
No. 19	1950	Great Northern Railway (Ireland) and Walker Brothers	Diesel	Sold to and preserved on the Isle of Man Railway in 1961.	Railcar No. 19 & 20 in preservation on the IOMR.
No. 20	1951	Great Northern Railway (Ireland) and Walker Brothers	Diesel	Sold to and preserved on the Isle of Man Railway in 1961.	

=== Wagons and carriages in preservation ===
- Carriages: 1 (UFTM), 3 (UFTM), 5 (DHRC) 14 (FVRM), 15 (DHRC), 28 (DHRC), 30 (FVRM), 352 (DG)
- Goods wagons: 12 (DHRC), 19 (FVRM), 136 (UFTM), unidentified horsebox (BHR), unidentified van (DHRC)

UFTM = Ulster Folk and Transport Museums; FVRM = Foyle Valley Railway Museum; BHR = Belturbet Heritage Railway; FTR = Fintown Railway; DRHC = Donegal Railway Heritage Centre; IOMR = Isle of Man Railway; C&LR = Cavan and Leitrim Railway; DG = Dunfanaghy Glamping

== See also ==
- List of narrow-gauge railways in Ireland
- County Donegal Railway locomotives
