= Glen River, County Donegal =

River in County Donegal, Ireland

River Glen Glen River
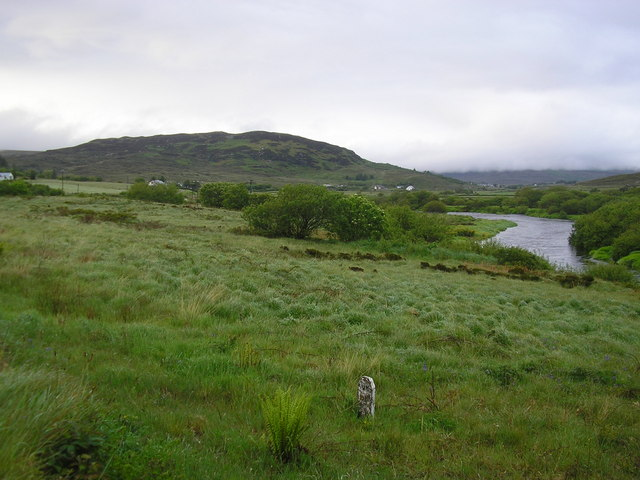
- Glen River and Croaghstraleel On the road between Carrick and Meenaneary
- Native name: Irish: Abhainn Ghlinne

Location
- Country: Ireland
- County: County Donegal

Physical characteristics
- Source
  - coordinates: 54.6844°N 8.62026°W

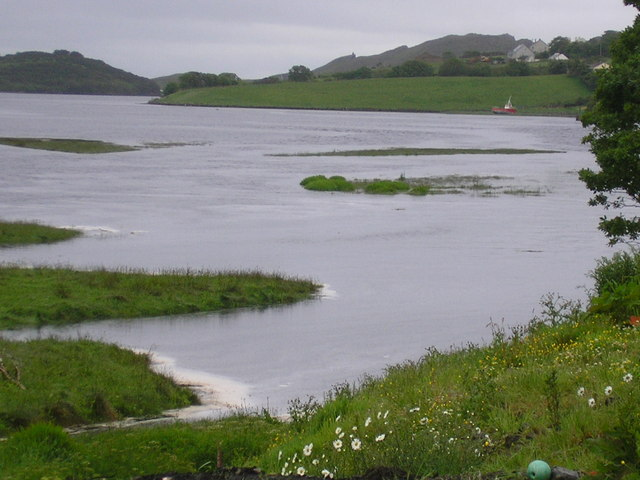
Glen River Estuary and Teelin Bay

The River Glen (Irish: Abhainn Ghlinne, also known as the Glen River) divides the parishes of Glencolmcille and Kilcar in the southwest of County Donegal, Ireland. It is most famous for its waterfalls, known by anglers as the "Salmons Leap", and as the name suggests, the falls are a good place to catch salmon. The river rises in the mountains above Ardara and empties into Teelin estuary in the shadow of Sliabh Liag.

During Storm Lorenzo in 2019, the largest flooding since 1939 occurred in the river and a popular footbridge that crossed the river at Carrick was damaged. In November 2021 the bridge was replaced by a new steel footbridge.
