= Muckross =

Muckross may refer to various places:

== Ireland ==
- Muckross Estate, now Killarney National Park, County Kerry; including
  - Muckross Abbey
  - Muckross House
  - Muckross Lake, one of the Lakes of Killarney
- Muckross Head, County Donegal
- Muckross Park College, Dublin

== Scotland ==
- Muck Ross or Muckross, an old name for Fife Ness
