= Carrick, County Donegal =

Village in County Donegal, Ireland

Carrick An Charraig
- Village
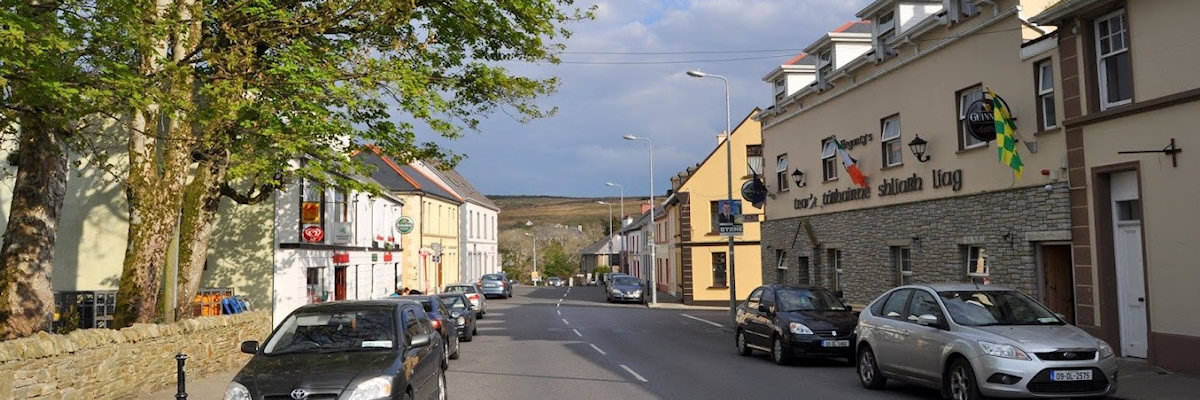
- Carrick's main street

- Location in Ireland
- Coordinates: 54°39′28″N 8°38′00″W
- Country: Ireland
- Province: Ulster
- County: County Donegal

Government
  - Dáil Éireann: Donegal
  - EU Parliament: Midlands–North-West

Population (2022)
  - Total: 308
- Irish Grid Reference: G591790

Carrick (Irish: An Charraig, meaning 'the rock') is a village located within the civil parish of Glencolmcille in County Donegal, Ireland. As of the 2022 census, the population of the village was 308. Carrick is located between neighbouring towns Glencolmcille, Meenanary, Teelin and Kilcar. Nearby is Slieve League, the highest sea cliff in Europe.

== Amenities ==
The village has a post office as well as a number of pubs, shops and coffee shops. The Roman Catholic church in the village is dedicated to Saint Colm Cille, and was built in the 1850s. The local national school has an enrollment of approximately 80 pupils, and the secondary school had an enrollment of 214 students in 2019. Teams representing the secondary school, Coláiste na Carraige, have won a number of trophies in Gaelic football.

== Notable people ==
Former or current residents of the village have included:

- Mary Cunningham (born c.1880), who emigrated to Cornish, New Hampshire where she was spotted by sculptor Augustus Saint-Gaudens and used as a model for 'Miss Liberty', appearing on the back of the $20 double eagle gold coin.
