= Kilcar =

Gaeltacht village in County Donegal, Ireland

Cill Charthaigh Kilcar
- Village
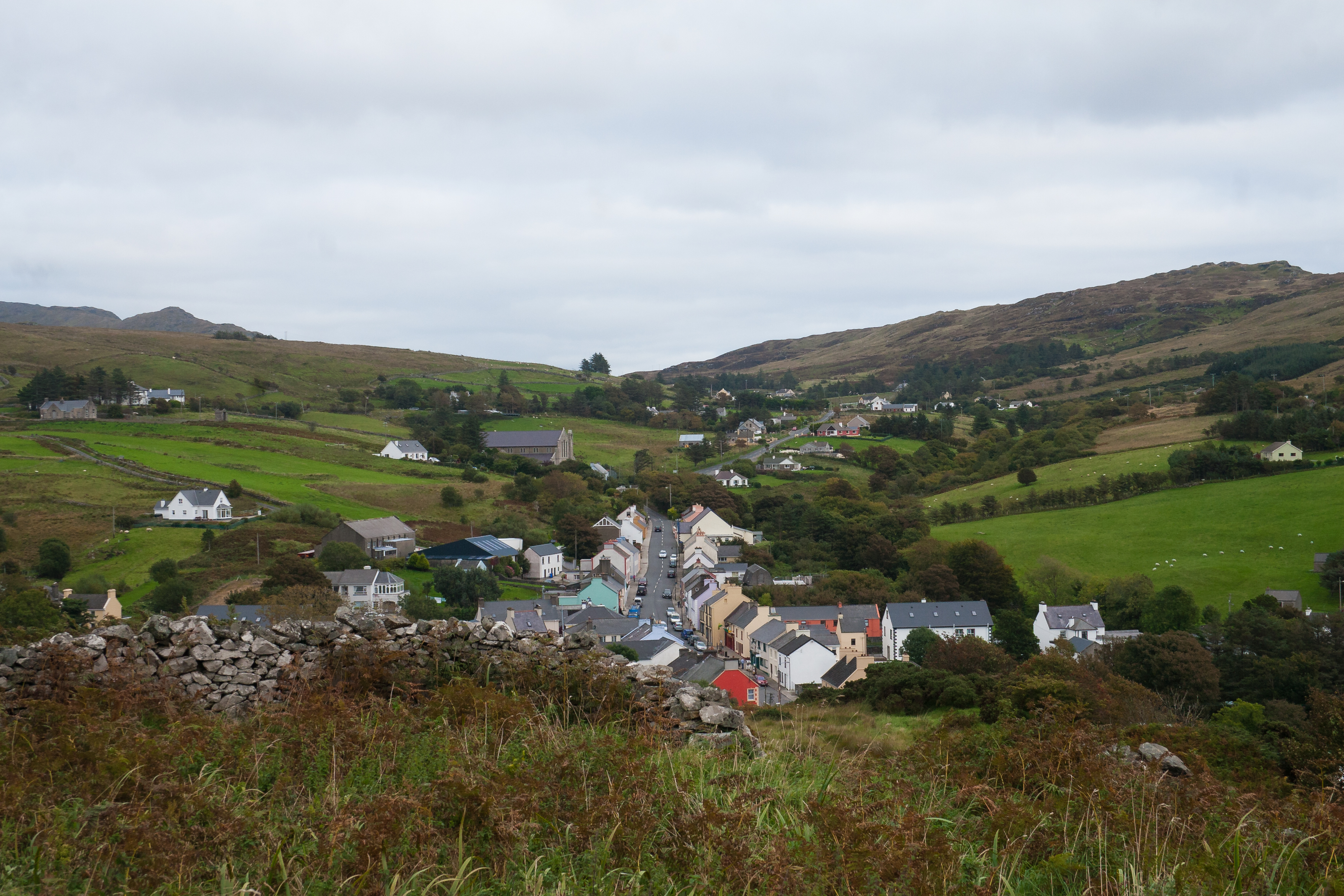
- View from the monastic site at the old church down to the village, looking east. The R263 is to be seen as it leaves Kilcar in direction to Killybegs

- Location in Ireland
- Coordinates: 54°37′57″N 8°35′34″W
- Country: Ireland
- Province: Ulster
- County: County Donegal
- Barony: Banagh

Government
  - Dáil Éireann: Donegal
  - EU Parliament: Midlands–North-West

Population (2022)
  - Total: 403
- Irish Grid Reference: G614763
- Cill Charthaigh is the only official name. The anglicised spelling Kilcar has no official status.

Cill Charthaigh (anglicised as Kilcar) is a Gaeltacht village on the R263 regional road in the south-west of County Donegal in Ireland. It is also a townland of 233 acres and a civil parish in the historic barony of Banagh.

Kilcar's main street has a Catholic church (known locally as 'the chapel') at one end and two textile factories at the other end. In between there are several shops and three pubs. The village has a tweed handweaving facility, with a shop selling tweed products. Kilcar is also known for its tradition in knitting.

The primary school is about 750 metres from the main street, and the parish of Kilcar stretches to the 'burn' which separates it from the next village, Carrick, which is about 5 kilometres away.

Located near the Slieve League cliffs, Kilcar is known for its coastal landscapes and musical traditions.

== Culture ==
Áislann Chill Chartha is a community facility which includes a library, café, sports hall (basketball and indoor football), a fitness suite, computer centre, and small theatre. It also has exhibits based on the history of South West Donegal and exhibitions of historic local photographs.

Students visit the area to learn Irish through Coláiste Chara, an Irish language summer school for teenagers.

Fleadh Cheoil Chill Chartha or Kilcar Fleadh is a yearly festival of music, song and dance celebrating the traditions of south-west Donegal.

As of 2024, a restoration was in progress to restore An Mhuileann Coirce Leitir (Corn Mill), with plans to restore the mill and drying kiln, mill dam, mill wheel and mill race. A new carpark was also due to be added.

== Sport and outdoor activities ==
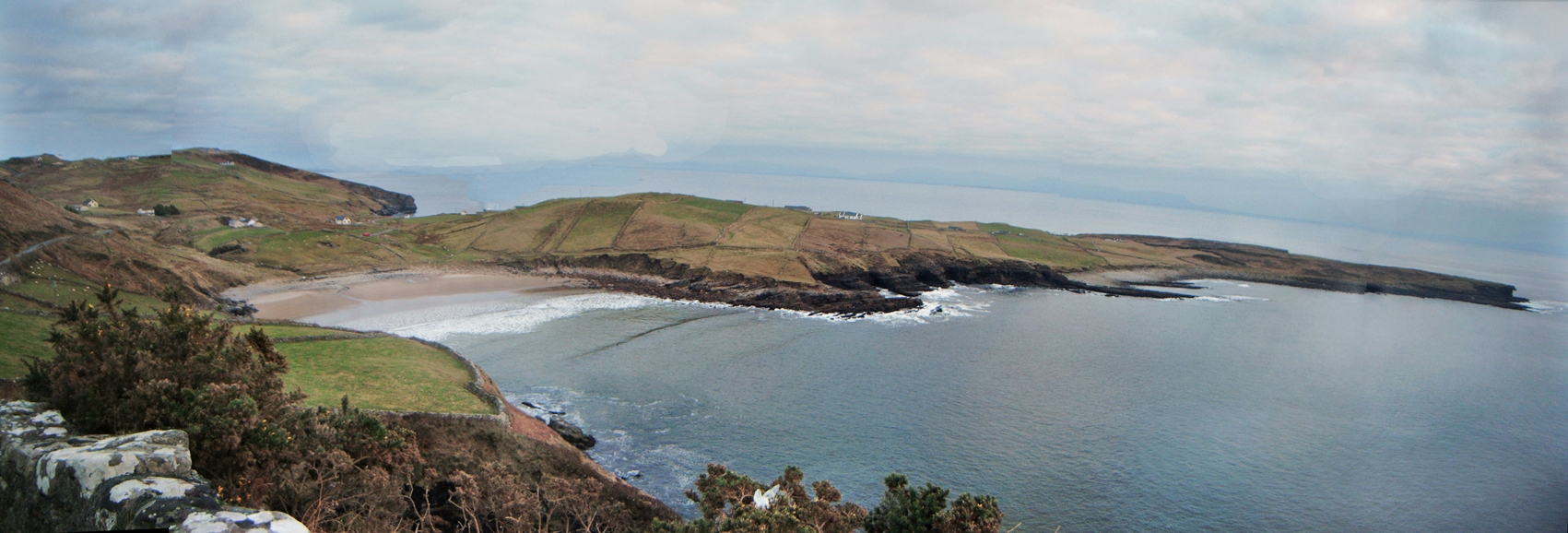
Muckros Peninsula, Kilcar

Gaelic football is among the more popular sports in Kilcar, and the Gaelic Athletic Association (GAA) pitch at Towney is located 2 kilometres outside the village on the coast road. The local GAA club, CLG Chill Chartha, have been six times Donegal Champions. CLG Chill Chartha promotes Gaeilge usage and organises Irish Language events within the community.

The townland of Muckross (Mucros in Irish) is a location for tourists due to its scenery, rock climbing, surfing and beaches. It is 3 km (2 mi) east of the village on the coast road (See Muckross Head).

Curris also has views of Sliabh a Liag, and has a beach and pier nearby.

== People ==
- Matthew Broderick and Sarah Jessica Parker own a holiday home in the area, and have been regular visitors.
- Bishop Séamus Hegarty was from Kilcar.
- Patrick McBrearty, Donegal GAA player is from Kilcar.
- Brothers James and Martin McHugh, 1992 All-Ireland Senior Football Champions, are from Kilcar. Martin is the father of Mark, 2012 All-Ireland champion and All Star and his brother Ryan, 2014 All-Ireland Finalist and All Star Award winner.
- The Revs, an indie rock band, come from Kilcar and sometimes play at the annual Kilcar Festival in August.

== See also ==
- List of populated places in the Republic of Ireland
- List of towns and villages in Northern Ireland
- Largy Waterfall
