= List of shipwrecks in March 1867 =

The list of shipwrecks in March 1867 includes ships sunk, foundered, grounded, or otherwise lost during March 1867.

== 1 March ==
List of shipwrecks: 1 March 1867
Ship	State	Description
Luna	United Kingdom	The barque ran aground at Sunderland, County Durham. She was on a voyage from Bordeaux, Gironde, France to Sunderland. She was refloated and taken in to Sunderland.

== 2 March ==
List of shipwrecks: 2 March 1867
Ship	State	Description
Bosphorus	United Kingdom	The steamship was wrecked near Valencia, Spain with the loss all twelve crew. She was on a voyage from Callao, Peru to Valencia.
Confiance	France	The ship was driven ashore at Fécamp, Seine-Inférieure.
Conqueror	United Kingdom	The ship was driven ashore on Fortune Island, Bahamas. She was on a voyage from St. Jago de Cuba, Cuba to Swansea, Glamorgan.
Constanza	Italy	The ship was driven ashore at Valencia. She was on a voyage from Genoa to Montevideo, Uruguay.
Couronne	French Navy	The ironclad frigate was driven ashore and damaged in the Îles d'Hyères, Var with the loss of several lives.
Fortuna	Italy	The ship was driven ashore at Valencia. She was on a voyage from Genoa to Montevideo.
George Washington	United States	The full-rigged ship was wrecked at Valencia with the loss of eight lives.
Gratitude	United Kingdom	The ship was wrecked at Aberdovey, Merionethshire.
Hoogezand	Hamburg	The ship was driven ashore.
James E. Brett	United States	The barque was driven ashore at Newhaven, Connecticut. She was on a voyage from South Shields, County Durham, United Kingdom to Newhaven. She was refloated.
Rosa	Spain	The schooner was wrecked at Valencia.
Sultana	United Kingdom	The full-rigged ship was wrecked at Valencia with the loss of all seventeen crew. She was on a voyage from Callao, Peru to Valencia.

== 3 March ==
List of shipwrecks: 3 March 1867
Ship	State	Description
Anacharsis	France	The ship foundered off the mouth of the Júcar with the loss of at least eleven lives.
Carl	Prussia	The schooner ran aground on the Shalotine Bank and was wrecked. She was on a voyage from Shanghai to Tientsin, China.
Caroline	United Kingdom	The ship ran aground on the Goodwin Sands, Kent. She was on a voyage from Boulogne, Pas-de-Calais, France to Sunderland, County Durham. She was refloated and taken in to Ramsgate, Kent in a leaky condition.
Confiance	France	The brig collided with the barque Giuseppina Oneto (Italy) and foundered with the loss of ten of her fourteen crew. Survivors were rescued by Giuseppina Oneto. Confiance was on a voyage from Marseille, Bouches-du-Rhône to Nantes, Loire-Inférieure.
Emma	(United Kingdom of Great Britain and Ireland) Colony of Western Australia	The ship departed from Port Walcott for Fremantle. No further trace, presumed foundered with the loss of all hands.
Lady Gray	United Kingdom	The ship ran aground in the Adour and was severely damaged. She was on a voyage from Aberdeen to Bayonne, Basses-Pyrénées.
XL	United Kingdom	The ship was driven ashore on the Whitburn Steel, on the coast of County Durham. She was on a voyage from Caen, Calvados to Sunderland, County Durham. She was refloated the next day and taken in to Sunderland.

== 4 March ==
List of shipwrecks: 4 March 1867
Ship	State	Description
Atalanta	United Kingdom	The barque sprang a leak and was run ashore at Muckross, County Donegal. She was on a voyage from Ardrossan, Ayrshire to Havana, Cuba.
Bee	United Kingdom	The schooner was wrecked on the Isle of May, Fife. Her crew were rescued. She was on a voyage from the Faroe Islands to Leith, Lothian.
Leonie	United Kingdom	The ship was wrecked on the Autoche Rock. Her crew were rescued. She was on a voyage from Llanelly, Glamorgan to Tonnay-Charente, Charente-Inférieure, France.
Liberty	United Kingdom	The smack foundered in the English Channel off Beachy Head, Sussex. Her crew were rescued. She was on a voyage from Étaples, Pas-de-Calais, France to Plymouth, Devon.
Rinaldo	United Kingdom	The steamship ran aground off Kastrup, Denmark. She was on a voyage from Sunderland, County Durham to Swinemünde, Prussia. She was refloated and resumed her voyage.
Two True Friends	United Kingdom	The ship was driven ashore at Cresswell, Northumberland. She was on a voyage from Sunderland, County Durham to Montrose, Forfarshire. She was refloated and taken in to Warkworth, Northumberland.
William Bell	United States	On March 4, 1867, the pilot boat William Bell, No. 24, lay full of water, a mile inside of the outer bar, eighteen miles east of Montauk Point, near the village of Amagansett, Long Island. There were four pilots on board at the time she struck the beach in bad weather. The vessel was reported as a total loss.
Unnamed	United Kingdom	The brig ran aground off Kastrup. She was refloated and resumed her voyage.

== 5 March ==
List of shipwrecks: 5 March 1867
Ship	State	Description
Cassard Janmell	United States	The brig was wrecked on the Île à Vache, Haiti. She was on a voyage from New York to Havre de Grâce, Seine-Inférieure, France.
Ceyn Amlwch	United Kingdom	The ship departed from Port Madoc, Caernarfonshire for London. No further trace, presumed foundered with the loss of all hands.
Clifton	United Kingdom	The ship was driven ashore at Wisbech Eye. She was on a voyage from Sutton Bridge, Lincolnshire to Newcastle upon Tyne, Northumberland. She was refloated on 7 March.
Kinghorn	United Kingdom	The steamship ran aground on the Scheelhoek, off the coast of Zeeland, Netherlands.
St. Catherine	United Kingdom	The brig sprang a leak and foundered in the Atlantic Ocean with the ultimate loss of one of her eight crew. She was on a voyage from Sherbro Island, Sierra Leone to Liverpool, Lancashire.

== 6 March ==
List of shipwrecks: 6 March 1867
Ship	State	Description
Amathea	United Kingdom	The ship was destroyed by fire at Appalachicola, Florida, United States.
Coldstream	United Kingdom	The brig ran aground and was wrecked on a sandbank off Pellworm, Prussia. Her crew survived. She was on a voyage from Sunderland, County Durham to Hamburg.
Grace Longstaff	United Kingdom	The ship was driven ashore and wrecked at Lowestoft, Suffolk. Her crew were rescued. She was on a voyage from South Shields, County Durham to Cádiz, Spain.
Nordcap	Norway	The schooner was driven ashore at Tinamayor, Spain. She was on a voyage from London, United Kingdom to Santander, Spain.
Palmyra	United Kingdom	The ship ran aground in the Rangoon River. She was on a voyage from Rangoon, Burma to an English port. She was refloated and resumed her voyage.
Shause	United Kingdom	The ship ran aground on "Olyphant Island".

== 7 March ==
List of shipwrecks: 7 March 1867
Ship	State	Description
Echo	United Kingdom	The steamship ran aground at Trelleborg, Sweden. She was on a voyage from a Baltic port to Hull, Yorkshire. She was refloated and taken in to Copenhagen, Denmark in a leaky condition.
Emma	(United Kingdom of Great Britain and Ireland) Colony of Western Australia	Emma, a 116 ton, two-masted wooden schooner, departed Tien Tsin Harbor (later Cossack) for Fremantle on 3 March, with 42 passengers and crew, but never arrived. Those on board included the explorer Trevarton Sholl and Charles Nairn, the first European to settle in the Pilbara region and a brother-in-law of the vessel's owner, Walter Padbury. By 24 April, Emma was regarded as "conisderably overdue" at Fremantle. The wreckage of Emma was discovered on a reef at Point Maud, Coral Bay, during the late 1970s or early 1980s.
Florence	United Kingdom	The ship ran aground on the Mussel Scarp. She was on a voyage from Trondheim, Norway to South Shields, County Durham. She was refloated and taken in to South Shields.
James and Eleanor	United Kingdom	The ship ran aground on the Swinebottoms, in the Baltic Sea. She was on a voyage from Newcastle upon Tyne, Northumberland to Copenhagen, Denmark. She was refloated and taken in to Helsingør, Denmark.
Lelia Alice	United Kingdom	The barque foundered north of Madeira. Her crew were rescued by the schooner Medina (United Kingdom). Lelia Alice was on a voyage from Liverpool, Lancashire to Rio de Janeiro, Brazil.
Leveret	United Kingdom	The ship ran aground and was wrecked at Blakeney, Norfolk. Her crew were rescued. She was on a voyage from Whitby, Yorkshire to Blakeney.
Louise	Prussia	The schooner was abandoned off Winterton-on-Sea, Norfolk. Her seven crew were rescued by the Caister Lifeboat.
Neptune	United Kingdom	The schooner foundered in the Irish Sea off the Hook Lighthouse, County Wexford. Her crew were rescued. She was on a voyage from Swansea, Glamorgan to Cork.
Progress	United Kingdom	The ship was wrecked on the Île à Vache, Haiti. She was on a voyage from Saint Thomas, Virgin Islands to Manzanillo, Cuba.
Shark	United Kingdom	The steamship ran aground in the Clyde at Greenock, Renfrewshire. She was refloated but grounded again.
William Hayman	United Kingdom	The steamship struck the pier at Hartlepool, County Durham and was beached. She was on a voyage from Rochester, Kent to Hartlepool.

== 8 March ==
List of shipwrecks: 8 March 1867
Ship	State	Description
Cleaver	United Kingdom	The brig foundered in the Bristol Channel 20 nautical miles (37 km) east of Lundy Island, Devon. Her crew were rescued by the barque Ada ( (United Kingdom of Great Britain and Ireland) British North America). Cleaver was on a voyage from Swansea, Glamorgan to Pasajes, Spain.
Jeune Marie	France	The lugger was wrecked on the Boeufs. Her crew survived. She was on a voyage from Swansea, Glamorgan, United Kingdom to Bordeaux, Gironde.
J. G. Nickels	United Kingdom	The barque was driven ashore at Tenerife, Canary Islands.
Otway	United Kingdom	The ship was wrecked on the North Bull, in the Irish Sea off the coast of County Dublin. She was on a voyage from Whitehaven, Cumberland to Dublin.
Progress	United Kingdom	The brig was wrecked at Aux Cayes, Haiti. She was on a voyage from Saint Thomas, Virgin Islands to Manzanilla, Cuba.
Taraipine	(United Kingdom of Great Britain and Ireland) New Zealand	The schooner left Wairoa on March 7, and anchored overnight at Paritu, south of Gisborne. She sailed the next day and was not seen again.

== 9 March ==
List of shipwrecks: 9 March 1867
Ship	State	Description
Brotherly Love	United Kingdom	The brig was run into by the steamship Bradley and severely damaged. She was assisted in to Lowestoft, Suffolk by the smack Hunter (United Kingdom) and was beached.
City of Florence	United Kingdom	The ship ran aground in the Clyde. She was on a voyage from the Clyde to Calcutta, India.
Louisa	United Kingdom	The ship was driven ashore. She was on a voyage from Llanelly, Glamorgan to Hayle, Cornwall.
Thames	United Kingdom	The ship departed from Cardiff, Glamorgan for Plymouth, Devon. No further trace, presumed foundered with the loss of all hands.

== 10 March ==
List of shipwrecks: 10 March 1867
Ship	State	Description
Desiderato	Austrian Empire	The brig sank in the Mediterranean Sea off the Balearic Islands, Spain. She was on a voyage from Leith, Lothian, United Kingdom to Genoa, Italy.
Helene	France	The ship foundered. Her crew were rescued. She was on a voyage from Alexandria, Egypt to Nantes, Loire-Inférieure.
Joseph Colin	United Kingdom	The brigantine was driven ashore and wrecked at the Landguard Fort, Felixtowe, Suffolk. She was on a voyage from Rochester, Kent to Sunderland.
Mystery	United Kingdom	The smack was run down and sunk in the Bristol Channel by a Swedish vessel. Her crew were rescued by Castleton (United Kingdom).
Olaf Kyrre	Russia	The ship was driven ashore at Waterloo, Lancashire, United Kingdom. She was on a voyage from Marianople to Liverpool, Lancashire. She was refloated and taken in to Liverpool.
Pellicano	United Kingdom	The ship was abandoned 80 nautical miles (150 km) off Cape Clear Island, County Cork. Her crew took to a boat; they were rescued on 14 March by Bellona (United Kingdom). Pellicano was on a voyage from Sulina, Ottoman Empire to Queenstown, County Cork.
Sir John Moore	United Kingdom	The ship was abandoned in the Atlantic Ocean. Her crew were rescued. She was on a voyage from Cardiff, Glamorgan to Hong Kong.
Squire	United Kingdom	The schooner sprang a leak and was run ashore at Donna Nook, Lincolnshire, where she was wrecked. Her four crew were rescued by the Donna Nook Lifeboat. She was on a voyage from Great Yarmouth, Norfolk to Grimsby, Lincolnshire.
Vienna	United Kingdom	The brig was abandoned in the North Sea. Her crew were rescued by a fishing boat. She was on a voyage from Sunderland to Texel, North Holland, Netherlands. She was towed in to Grimsby, Lincolnshire in a derelict condition.

== 11 March ==
List of shipwrecks: 11 March 1867
Ship	State	Description
Anenome	United Kingdom	The ship was wrecked at Port Eynon, Glamorgan. Her crew were rescued.
Atlanta	United Kingdom	The schooner sank at Berwick upon Tweed, Northumberland. She was on a voyage from Hartlepool, County Durham to Bo'ness, Lothian.
Gangerrolf	Sweden	The ship was driven ashore at Hela, Prussia. Her crew were rescued. She was on a voyage from Söderhamn to Dundee, Forfarshire, United Kingdom.
Laurel	United Kingdom	The ship departed from Jersey, Channel Islands for "La Poule", Newfoundland, British North America. No further trace, presumed foundered with the loss of all hands.
Lioness	United Kingdom	The ship struck a rock at A Coruña, Spain and was wrecked. She was on a voyage from A Coruña to Falmouth, Cornwall.
Phare	Belgium	The brig was driven ashore near Covehithe, Suffolk. Her crew were rescued. She was on a voyage from Ostend, West Flanders to Sunderland, County Durham.
Sir Robert Calder	United Kingdom	The schooner departed from Queenstown, County Cork for Londonderry. No further trace, presumed foundered with the loss of all hands.

== 12 March ==
List of shipwrecks: 12 March 1867
Ship	State	Description
Alfred	United Kingdom	The ship was abandoned in the Atlantic Ocean. Her crew were rescued by Cora Linn (United Kingdom). Alfred was on a voyage from Cardiff, Glamorgan to Rio de Janeiro, Brazil.
Alpha	United Kingdom	The ship was driven ashore near Fredrikshavn, Denmark. She was on a voyage from Kalundborg, Denmark to hull, Yorkshire.
Athanasian, and Saint Louis	United Kingdom; France	The steamship Athanasian collided with Saint Louis at Le Verdon-sur-Mer, Gironde and was severely damaged. She was on a voyage from Glasgow, Renfrewshire to Le Verdon-sur-Mer. Saint Louis sank, She was on a voyage from the River Plate to Le Verdon-sur-Mer.
Jenny	United Kingdom	The ship was driven ashore. She was on a voyage from Gothenburg, Sweden to Cardiff. She was refloated and taken in to Ramsgate, Kent in a leaky condition.
Maria Wilhelmina	Wismar	The ship ran aground on Secland's Reef, in the Baltic Sea. She was on a voyage from Wismar to Leith, Lothian, United Kingdom. She was refloated and taken in to Helsingør, Denmark in a leaky condition.
Marie Christine	United Kingdom	The ship was driven ashore at Bangsbostrand, near Fredrikshavn. She was on a voyage from Nykjobing, Denmark to Hartlepool, County Durham. She was refloated on 29 March and taken in to Fredrikshavn.
Naiad	United Kingdom	The ship was driven ashore at Castletown, Isle of Man. She was on a voyage from Clare to Cardiff, Glamorgan.
Nora	United Kingdom	The brig was driven ashore and wrecked at Dungeness, Kent with the loss of her captain. She was on a voyage from Langsund, Norway to Barrow in Furness, Lancashire.
Rover	United States	The bark struck a coral reef called Qixingyan near Oluanpi, Formosa, and drifted into the area of Kenting, Formosa. Surviving crew members who made it to shore were massacred by Taiwanese Aborigines, prompting an unsuccessful U.S. military expedition against the offending Paiwan tribe.
Sarah	United Kingdom	The ship was wrecked at Pointe Saint-Mathieu, Finistère, France. She was on a voyage from Pont-l'Abbé, Finistère to Jersey, Channel Islands.
Victorie	France	The ship was driven ashore near Le Conquet, Finistère.
Warren	United Kingdom	The ship was driven ashore at Fredrikshavn. She was on a voyage from Rostock to London.

== 13 March ==
List of shipwrecks: 13 March 1867
Ship	State	Description
Cholmley	United Kingdom	The ship was driven ashore at Bridlington, Yorkshire. She was on a voyage from Fécamp, Seine-Inférieure, France to Hartlepool, County Durham.
Daring	United Kingdom	The fishing smack struck the pier at Ramsgate, Kent and was wrecked with the loss of all five crew.
Inga	Norway	The ship capsized and foundered off the Isles of Scilly, United Kingdom. Five survivors were rescued by Ydale (Flag unknown). Inga was on a voyage from Alexandria, Egypt to Christiania.
Mahlenhof	Flag unknown	The ship ran aground on the Owers Sandbank, in the English Channel off the coast of Sussex, United Kingdom. She was on a voyage from Havre de Grâce, Seine-Inférieure, France to South Shields, County Durham, United Kingdom.
Oregon	United Kingdom	The ship was driven ashore in Cawsand Bay. Her crew were rescued.
Sir Duncan Cameron	(United Kingdom of Great Britain and Ireland) New Zealand	The cutter was wrecked at Napier during a severe gale, with the loss of four lives.
Thomas Fielden	United Kingdom	The barque sprang a leak and foundered in the Atlantic Ocean (47°30′N 11°56′W). Her crew were rescued by the brig Emilia Sophia (Italy). Thomas Fielden was on a voyage from Sunderland, County Durham to Salobreña, Spain.
Utopia	United Kingdom	The ship sank 150 nautical miles (280 km) west of Cape Clear Island, County Cork. Her crew were rescued by the barque Samuel (United Kingdom). Utopia was on a voyage from Liverpool, Lancashire to Bombay and Kurrachee, India. A Board of Trade enquiry revealed that she had run aground at the entrance of the Brunswick Dock, Liverpool on or about 6 March. She was refloated after four to six tides and was then leaking at a rate of 20 inches (51 cm) per hour. The condition of the ship was not disclosed to Lloyd's surveyors. Had it been, she would not have been permitted to sail.
Wind	United Kingdom	The brigantine was driven ashore at "Seapark", County Wicklow. Her crew were rescued. She was on a voyage from Cardiff, Glamorgan to Wicklow.

== 14 March ==
List of shipwrecks: 14 March 1867
Ship	State	Description
Alma	United Kingdom	The collier, a brig, ran aground in the Elbe. She was on a voyage from Cuxhaven to Hartlepool, County Durham. She was refloated and put back to Cuxhaven.
Harry	United Kingdom	The brig foundered in the North Sea 25 nautical miles (46 km) west north west of Heligoland. Her eight crew were rescued by the galiot Ehrenfeld (Bremen). Harry was on a voyage from Sunderland, County Durham to Hamburg.
Jane Gray	United Kingdom	The ship ran aground at Harwich, Essex. She was on a voyage from Dunkirk, Nord, France to Blyth, Northumberland. She was refloated.
Jeanne Marie	France	The ship was wrecked at "Bœufs". She was on a voyage from Swansea, Glamorgan, United Kingdom to Bordeaux, Gironde.
Laurits	Denmark	The ship was lost near Lemvig. Her crew were rescued. She was on a voyage from Hull, Yorkshire United Kingdom to Rudkøbing.
Mahala	United States	The ship caught fire at Bordeaux and was run ashore.
Maitland	United Kingdom	The ship was abandoned in the Atlantic Ocean. Her crew were rescued by Lady Love (United Kingdom). Maitland was on a voyage from the Black Sea to a British port.
Percy Douglas	United Kingdom	The ship was driven ashore at Dover, Kent. She was on a voyage from Colombo, Ceylon to London. She was refloated with assistance from the tug Palmerston (United Kingdom) and was towed to Gravesend, Kent.
Robinson Crusoe	United Kingdom	The ship ran aground in the Hooghly River. She was on a voyage from Calcutta, India to London. She was refloated and resumed her voyage.
Stately	(United Kingdom of Great Britain and Ireland) New Zealand	The 80-ton schooner was wrecked at Oamaru during a gale, when she was driven onto rocks. All hands were saved.
Syrian	United Kingdom	The steamship was driven ashore north of Gallipoli, Ottoman Empire. She was refloated.
Thea	United Kingdom	The barque foundered in the Bay of Biscay. Her crew were rescued.
Thomas Fielden	United Kingdom	The ship foundered in the Bay of Biscay. Her crew were rescued.
William and Sarah	United Kingdom	The schooner sprang a leak and foundered in the Atlantic Ocean 60 nautical miles (110 km) north west of the Isles of Scilly, Her crew were rescued by schooner Heimdahl (Denmark). William and Sarah was on a voyage from Shoreham-by-Sea, Sussex to Bridgwater, Somerset.

== 15 March ==
List of shipwrecks: 15 March 1867
Ship	State	Description
Alliance	United Kingdom	The brig sprang a leak and sank 25 nautical miles (46 km) off Trinidad. Her crew survived. She was on a voyage from Demerara, British Guiana to Queenstown, County Cork.
David McNutt	United Kingdom	The clipper, a barque, was severely damaged by fire at Glasgow, Renfrewshire.
Elizabeth	United Kingdom	The barque ran aground at Harwich, Essex. She was further damaged when Kezia Page (United Kingdom) ran into her.
Fychow	United Kingdom	The ship was sighted off Sandy Hook, New Jersey, United States whilst on a voyage from New York, United States to London. No further trace, presumed to have foundered in the Atlantic Ocean with the loss of all hands.

== 16 March ==
List of shipwrecks: 16 March 1867
Ship	State	Description
Carl Johan	Norway	The ship foundered with he loss of all but one of her crew. The survivor was rescued by Eugenie (United Kingdom). Carl Johan was on a voyage from Liverpool, Lancashire, United Kingdom to Bergen.
David McNutt	United Kingdom	The ship caught fire at Glasgow, Renfrewshire.
Desiderato L.	Italy	The ship was wrecked. She was on a voyage from Leith, Lothian, United Kingdom to Genoa.
Florida	United Kingdom	The steamship departed from Liverpool for Alexandria, Egypt Eyalet. Subsequently foundered with the loss of all 37 crew; wreckage from the ship washed up on the Irish coast.
Herald	United Kingdom	The ship departed from South Shields, County Durham for Hong Kong. No further trace, presumed foundered with the loss of all sixteen crew.
Hind	United States	The ship was driven ashore on Long Island, New York. She was on a voyage from Jamaica to New York City. She broke up on 5 April.
Laurids	United Kingdom	The ship was wrecked at Rønne, Denmark. Her crew were rescued. She was on a voyage from Hull, Yorkshire to "Veile".
Messina	United Kingdom	The steamship ran aground in the Clyde near Gourock, Renfrewshire. She was on a voyage from the Clyde to the Mediterranean. She was refloated and resumed her voyage.

== 17 March ==
List of shipwrecks: 17 March 1867
Ship	State	Description
Blessings	United Kingdom	The smack was driven ashore and wrecked at Penarth, Glamorgan. She was on a voyage from Cardiff, Glamorgan to Bridgwater, Somerset.
Carnanton	United Kingdom	The ship was driven ashore on Samson, Isles of Scilly. Her crew were rescued. She was on a voyage from Swansea, Glamorgan to Havre de Grâce, Seine-Inférieure.
Devonia	United Kingdom	The schooner was abandoned in Polkerris Bay, Cornwall. Her five crew were rescued by the Fowey Lifeboat.
Elwy	United Kingdom	The ship collided with a steamship and sank off the coast of Suffolk. Her crew were rescued by the steamship. She was on a voyage from London to Sunderland, County Durham.
Gipsey	United Kingdom	The schooner was driven ashore between Penzance and St. Michael's Mount, Cornwall. Her crew were rescued by rocket apparatus. She was on a voyage from Llanelly, Glamorgan to Southampton, Hampshire.
Lea Fray	United Kingdom	The brig was driven ashore and sank at Falmouth. Her crew were rescued.
Marmion	United Kingdom	The barque was driven ashore and wrecked at Gyllyngvase, Cornwall with the loss of two of her eleven crew. She was on a voyage from Odesa, Russia to South Shields, County Durham.
Providence	(United Kingdom of Great Britain and Ireland) Guernsey or Jersey	The brig collided with Gambia (United Kingdom), struck the Albert Pier, and sank off the harbour at Penzance, Cornwall. Both crews were saved.
Sea Spray	United Kingdom	The brig was driven into Colombia (United Kingdom) and sank at Falmouth, Cornwall. Her crew were rescued. She was on a voyage from Enos, Ottoman Empire to Falmouth. Sea Spray was refloated on 17 June.
Stephen Knight	United Kingdom	The ship was driven ashore at St. Ives, Cornwall. She was on a voyage from Newport, Monmouthshire to Plymouth, Devon.
St. Oswain	United Kingdom	The ship was sighted in The Downs whilst on a voyage from South Shields to Pondicherry, India. No further trace, presumed foundered with the loss of all hands.
Tavarnes Baston	Brazil	The paddle steamer was driven ashore and wrecked near Kingstown, County Dublin. Her crew were rescued. She was on a voyage from Glasgow, Renfrewshire, United Kingdom to Bahia.
Theria	Portugal	The brigantine was driven ashore at Trefusis, Cornwall.
Urania	United Kingdom	The steamship ran aground on the Kentish Knock. She was on a voyage from Great Yarmouth, Norfolk to Cardiff. She was refloated and taken in to Dover, Kent.
Virginie	France	The schooner was run down and sunk off Dunkirk, Nord by the steamship Glengarry (United Kingdom). Her crew were rescued by Glengarry. Virginie was on a voyage from Dunkirk to Bordeaux, Gironde.

== 18 March ==
List of shipwrecks: 18 March 1867
Ship	State	Description
Alexander	Grand Duchy of Mecklenburg-Schwerin	The brig was damaged in a gale at Falmouth, Cornwall, United Kingdom. She was on a voyage from Odesa, Russia to Falmouth.
Alipede	Portugal	The brig was damaged in a gale at Falmouth. She was on a voyage from Lagos, Portugal to London.
Angela	Russia	The schooner was driven ashore on Saltholmen, Denmark. She was on a voyage from South Shields, County Durham, United Kingdom to Lübeck. She was refloated.
Araminta	United Kingdom	The ship foundered off the Smalls Lighthouse, Cornwall with the loss of one of her eighteen crew. Survivors were rescued by the schooner Duchess of Sutherland (United Kingdom). Araminta was on a voyage from Liverpool, Lancashire to Boston, Massachusetts, United States.
Atlas	United Kingdom	The barque collided with several vessels and was damaged at Falmouth. She was on a voyage from Odesa to Falmouth.
Auxilar	United Kingdom	The barque was damaged in a gale at Falmouth. She was on a voyage from the Isles of Scilly to North Shields, Northumberland.
Belem	United Kingdom	The ship was abandoned off the coast of County Down. Her crew were rescued by the steamship Genova (Italy). Belem was on a voyage from Liverpool to Gibraltar.
Bethesda	United Kingdom	The ship struck the Owers Sandbank, in the English Channel of the coast of Sussex and sank with the loss of five of her seven crew. She was on a voyage from the River Wear to Portsmouth, Hampshire.
Cambridge	United Kingdom	The brig foundered in the North Sea off Flamborough Head, Yorkshire. Her crew were rescued by Landscape (United Kingdom). Cambridge was on a voyage from Sunderland, County Durham to London.
Catch	United Kingdom	The brigantine collided with Euphrosyne (United Kingdom) and was damaged at Falmouth.
Centurion	United Kingdom	The barque was wrecked on the Rose Sand, off the coast of Lincolnshire. All eighteen people on board were rescued by the Theddlethorpe Lifeboat. She was on a voyage from South Shields, County Durham to Barcelona, Spain.
Ceres	United Kingdom	The schooner was driven ashore and wrecked at Porthdinllaen, Caernarfonshire. Her crew were rescued. She was on a voyage from Aberystwyth, Cardiganshire to the River Dee.
Charles Souchay	United Kingdom	The brigantine was abandoned in the Irish Sea. Her crew survived. She was on a voyage from Ipswich, Suffolk to Whitehaven, Cumberland.
Columba	United Kingdom	The full-rigged ship collided with another vessel and was damaged at Falmouth. She was on a voyage from Mauritius to Aberdeen.
Consul	United Kingdom	The barque was driven ashore at Falmouth and was abandoned by all but two of her crew. she was on a voyage from Sulina, Ottoman Empire to South Shields.
Deutschland	Grand Duchy of Mecklenburg-Schwerin	The brig was damaged in a gale at Falmouth. She was on a voyage from Odesa to Falmouth.
Douglas	United Kingdom	The barque foundered in the Atlantic Ocean 300 nautical miles (560 km) off Cape Finisterre, Spain. Her crew were rescued by Superb (United Kingdom. Douglas was on a voyage from "Aquilas" to Newcastle upon Tyne, Northumberland.
Egbert	United Kingdom	The barque ran aground off Bembridge, Isle of Wight and was wrecked. Her crew were rescued by the Coastguard. She was on a voyage from the Danube to South Shields.
Elflida	United Kingdom	The ship was abandoned off the coast of Cornwall. Her crew were rescued by Gladiator (United Kingdom). Elflida was on a voyage from London to Swansea, Glamorgan.
Emma Jane	United Kingdom	The ship was driven ashore in the Isles of Scilly. She was on a voyage from Waterford to Charlestown, Cornwall. She was refloated.
Eugenie	Belgium	The brig was damaged in a gale at Falmouth. She was on a voyage from Gonaïves, Haiti to Antwerp, Belgium.
Euphrosyne, and Ida Patrone	United Kingdom; Italy	The barque Euphrosyne collided the barque Ida Patrone and was abandoned off Falmouth with the loss of twelve of the sixteen people on board. She was on a voyage from Taganrog, Russia to Falmouth. Euprhosyne subsequently drove ashore. Ida Patrone sank with the loss of all hands. She was on a voyage from Odesa to Falmouth.
Flink	Prussia	The full-rigged ship foundered 14 nautical miles (26 km) east of the Isles of Scilly. Her crew were rescued. She was on a voyage from Liverpool to Memel.
Freraro Baston, or Yervis Bastas	Brazil	The paddle steamer was wrecked at Kingstown, County Dublin, United Kingdom. Her crew were rescued. She was on a voyage from the Clyde to Bahia.
Giovanni Po	Austrian Empire	The barque was driven ashore and severely damaged at Falmouth. She was on a voyage from Enos, Ottoman Empire to Antwerp.
Iberia	Portugal	The brigantine was driven ashore and wrecked at Trefusis, Cornwall with the loss of nine of her crew. She was on a voyage from Porto to Havre de Grâce, Seine-Inférieure, France.
Indomitable	United Kingdom	The ship foundered in the Atlantic Ocean. Her crew were rescued by Empreza (Flag unknown). Indomitable was on a voyage from Liverpool to Saint Andrews, New Brunswick, British North America.
Iris	Norway	The barque was damaged in a gale at Falmouth.
James	United Kingdom	The brigantine was driven ashore and wrecked at Combe Martin, Devon. Her crew were rescued. She was on a voyage from Ipswich to Bristol, Gloucestershire.
Jean Baptiste	France	The ship was abandoned at sea. She was on a voyage from Pisagua, Chile to Bordeaux, Gironde.
John and Rebecca	United Kingdom	The ship struck The Manacles and foundered. Her crew were rescued. She was on a voyage from London to Waterford.
Leader	United Kingdom	The brigantine was damaged in a gale at Falmouth.
Margenstern	Prussia	The brigantine was damaged in a gale at Falmouth. She was on a voyage from Marseille, Bouches-du-Rhône, France to Great Yarmouth, Norfolk, United Kingdom.
Mary Ann	United Kingdom	The schooner was damaged in a gale at Falmouth.
Mary Lewis	United Kingdom	The schooner ran around and sank off St. Ives, Cornwall. Her five crew were rescued by the St. Ives Lifeboat. She was refloated and beached.
Narcissus	United Kingdom	The brigantine was damaged in a gale at Falmouth. She was on a voyage from Lisbon, Portugal to Exeter, Devon.
Nidros	Norway	The barque foundered 10 nautical miles (19 km) south of the Isles of Scilly. Her crew were rescued by Alexandrine (United Kingdom)/, Nidros was on a voyage from Odesa to Falmouth.
Ophelia	Russia	The barque was damaged in a gale at Falmouth. She was towed in to Falmouth by the tug Dandy (United Kingdom).
Oregon	United Kingdom	The ship was driven ashore at Plymouth, Devon. Her crew were rescued. She was on a voyage from Cartagena, Spain to South Shields. Oregon was refloated on 20 March and taken in to Sutton Harbour.
Osprey	United Kingdom	The brig was abandoned in the Atlantic Ocean. Her crew were rescued. She was on a voyage from Taganrog to a British port.
Rose and Mary	United Kingdom	The brig struck a sunken rock at Vigo, Spain and was holed. She was on a voyage from London to Vigo.
Sarah Ann	(United Kingdom of Great Britain and Ireland) Jersey	The brigantine was wrecked off Selsey, Sussex. Her six crew were rescued by the Selsey Lifeboat. She was on a voyage from Jersey to London.
Scylla	United Kingdom	The ship ran aground on the Puller Shoal, in the English Channel off Selsey Bill, Sussex and was wrecked with the loss of five of her seven crew. Survivors were rescued by a coaster.
Stonewall Jackson	United Kingdom	The barque was sighted in distress by the steamship City of Manchester (United Kingdom) and was taken in tow. The tow was lost and Stonewall Jackson foundered off the Old Head of Kinsale, County Cork with the loss of all on board. She was on a voyage from Liverpool to Simon's Bay, Cape Colony.
Uhla	United Kingdom	The brig was driven from her moorings at Falmouth. She ran aground and was abandoned by her crew. She was on a voyage from South Shields to Constantinople, Ottoman Empire.
Vesta	United Kingdom	The schooner was driven into the barque Luconia (Netherlands) and was then driven ashore at Penryn, Cornwall. She was on a voyage from Harwich, Essex to Bridgwater, Somerset.
Waterhen	United Kingdom	The ship was damaged in a gale at Falmouth.
William Henry	United Kingdom	The schooner ran aground on the Howth Banks, in the North Sea off the coast of County Dublin. Her six crew were rescued by the Coastguard.
Woodfield	United Kingdom	The barque was damaged in a gale at Falmouth. She was on a voyage from Alexandria, Egypt to Sunderland.
Yorkshire	United Kingdom	The barque was driven ashore at Falmouth. She was on a voyage from Boston, Massachusetts, United States to London.
Yrali	Norway	The barque was damaged in a gale at Falmouth. She was on a voyage from Odesa to Falmouth.
Unnamed	Flag unknown	The ship was driven ashore east of Dungeness, Kent, United Kingdom.

== 19 March ==
List of shipwrecks: 19 March 1867
Ship	State	Description
Comstable	France	The schooner was driven ashore in Sennen Cove, Cornwall, United Kingdom. She was on a voyage from Nantes, Loire-Inférieure to Cardiff, Glamorgan, United Kingdom. Comstable was refloated and beached in Whitsand Bay. She was taken in to Hayle, Cornwall in a derelict condition the next day.
Danielo Manin	Italy	The barque ran aground on the Saba Bank. She was on a voyage from Demerara, British Guiana to Greenock, Renfrewshire, United Kingdom. She was refloated and put in to Kingston, Jamaica.
Fullwood	United Kingdom	The ship was abandoned in the Atlantic Ocean. Her crew were rescued by Gilbert (United Kingdom). Fullwood was on a voyage from Calcutta, India to Liverpool, Lancashire.
Ole Vig	Flag unknown	The ship was abandoned at sea. Her crew survived. She was on a voyage from Sulina, Ottoman Empire to Liverpool, Lancashire, United Kingdom.
William and Henry	United Kingdom	The schooner was driven ashore at Malahide, County Dublin. Her crew were rescued by a lifeboat.

== 20 March ==
List of shipwrecks: 20 March 1867
Ship	State	Description
Contest	United Kingdom	The brig was driven ashore and wrecked west of Dale, Pembrokeshire.
Countess of Fortescue	United Kingdom	The schooner was beached at Dale. She was on a voyage from Newport, Monmouthshire to Pembroke.
Dirk	United Kingdom	The schooner was beached at Dale. She was on a voyage from Dublin to Gloucester.
Felipito	Argentina	The ship was driven ashore. She was on a voyage from Havre de Grâce, Seine-Inférieure, France to Buenos Aires. She was refloated and taken in to Cherbourg, Seine-Inférieure.
Geertruida Maria	Netherlands	The ship was driven ashore in Pegwell Bay. She was on a voyage from Dordrecht, South Holland to Cardiff. She was refloated and taken in to Ramsgate, Kent, United Kingdom.
John	United Kingdom	The smack was driven ashore at Dale.
Joven Henriette	Spain	The ship was driven ashore at Tenerife, Canary Islands.
L'Aigle	France	The ship was abandoned in the Atlantic Ocean. She was on a voyage from Gloucester, United Kingdom to Saint-Malo, Ille-et-Vilaine.
Malaga	United States	The brig was wrecked on Roanoke Island, North Carolina.
Patrie	Norway	The ship collided with Vulcan (United Kingdom) and was abandoned off the Isles of Scilly. She was on a voyage from Falmouth, Cornwall to London.
Providence	United Kingdom	The schooner was driven ashore and sank west of Dale.
Sevarres	Brazil	The paddle steamer sprang a leak and foundered off the Irish coast 50°30′N 10°25′W. Her crew were rescued by the barque Affiance (United Kingdom). Sevarres was on a voyage from the Clyde to Bahia.
Toscano	United States	The ship was abandoned in the Atlantic Ocean. She was on a voyage from Liverpool, Lancashire, United Kingdom to Charleston, South Carolina.
Wolverine	United Kingdom	The barque was driven ashore and wrecked at Crookhaven, County Cork. She was on a voyage from Demerara, British Guiana to Liverpool.

== 21 March ==
List of shipwrecks: 21 March 1867
Ship	State	Description
Alida	United Kingdom	The ship was abandoned in the Atlantic Ocean. Her crew were rescued. She was on a voyage from Liverpool, Lancashire to Boston, Massachusetts, United States.
Annie Ramsey	United Kingdom	The ship was abandoned in the Atlantic Ocean. Her crew were rescued by Clarissa Ann Marshman (United States). Annie Ramsey was on a voyage from New York, United States to Bristol, Gloucestershire.
Dagmar	Russia	The barque was wrecked on the Longsand, in the North Sea off the coast of Essex, United Kingdom. Her eighteen crew took to the boats; thirteen were rescued by the smack Paragon (United Kingdom), five were reported missing. Dagmar Was on a voyage from Amsterdam, North Holland, Netherlands to Liverpool.
Freja	Portugal	The ship was driven ashore at St. Ubes.
J. B. Curtis	United States	The schooner was abandoned at sea. Her crew survived.
Leonidas	United Kingdom	The ship struck the pier at Ryde, Isle of Wight and sank. She was on a voyage from Hartlepool, County Durham to Ryde.
Pomona	United Kingdom	The ship ran aground on the Goodwin Sands, Kent.
Sarah Bridget	United Kingdom	The brigantine ran aground on the Goodwin Sands.
William Veil	United Kingdom	The ship wasb abandoned in the Atlantic Ocean. She was on a voyage from Cardiff, Glamorgan to Rio de Janeiro, Brazil.

== 22 March ==
List of shipwrecks: 22 March 1867
Ship	State	Description
Burlington	United Kingdom	The brig ran aground on the Maplin Sand, in the North Sea off the coast of Essex. Her nine crew were rescued by the smack Beulah (United Kingdom). Burlington was on a voyage from London to North Shields, Northumberland. She was refloated on 4 April and towed in to Southend, Essex.
Diosma	France	The ship foundered in the Atlantic Ocean. Her crew were rescued by Fire Queen (United Kingdom). Diosma was on a voyage from Belize City, British Honduras to Havre de Grâce, Seine-Inférieure.
Early	United Kingdom	The steamship was driven ashore at Sandiland Point, County Down. All on board were rescued. She was on a voyage from Dublin to Glasgow, Renfrewshire.
Gem	United Kingdom	The ship sank at Great Yarmouth, Norfolk.
Habein, Halem, Helen, or Harem	United Kingdom	The barque foundered off Ballycotton, County Down.
Harlequin	United Kingdom	The brigantine was wrecked on Grassholm, Pembrokeshire. Her crew were rescued on 24 March by Lowther (United Kingdom). Harlequin was on a voyage from Ipswich, Suffolk to Kirkcudbright.
John	United Kingdom	The ship was driven ashore at Lamlash, Isle of Arran. She was on a voyage from Belfast, County Antrim to Troon, Ayrshire. She was refloated on 8 April.
Quaxonia	United Kingdom	The ship was driven ashore at Lowestoft, Suffolk. She was refloated.
Sarah Bright	United Kingdom	The ship ran aground on the Goodwin Sands, Kent. She was refloated and taken in to Ramsgate, Kent in a leaky condition.

== 23 March ==
List of shipwrecks: 23 March 1867
Ship	State	Description
Amaranth	United Kingdom	The ship was abandoned off Lowestoft, Suffolk. Her crew were rescued by Grace (United Kingdom).
Elizabeth Ann	(United Kingdom of Great Britain and Ireland) New Zealand	The cutter was wrecked at "Tairna". She was on a voyage from "Tairna" to Wellington.
Loretto	United Kingdom	The barque was abandoned in the Irish Sea off the coast of County Wexford. Her fourteen crew were rescued by a tug and the Wexford Lifeboat Civil Service ( Royal National Lifeboat Institution). Loretto was on a voyage from Antwerp, Belgium to Liverpool, Lancashire.
Mary	United Kingdom	The schooner was driven ashore and wrecked at Drogheda, County Louth. Her three crew were rescued by the Drogheda Lifeboat. She was on a voyage from Liverpool to Drogheda, County Louth.
Wild Horse	(United Kingdom of Great Britain and Ireland) British North America	The barque was driven ashore and wrecked in Tramore Bay. Her ten crew were rescued by the Tramore Lifeboat. She was on a voyage from New York, United States to Liverpool. She was refloated on 9 April.
William	France	The sloop was driven ashore in Dundrum Bay. Her six crew were rescued by the Tyrella Lifeboat. She was on a voyage from Paimpol, Côtes-du-Nord to Iceland.

== 24 March ==
List of shipwrecks: 24 March 1867
Ship	State	Description
Alfred	United Kingdom	The ship caught fire in the Atlantic Ocean.
Clyde	United Kingdom	The schooner ran aground off the Westgat and was wrecked. Her crew were rescued. She was on a voyage from Cardiff, Glamorgan to Hamburg.
Diana	United Kingdom	The ship was abandoned in the Atlantic Ocean. She was on a voyage from New York, United States to Cork.
Edgar Cecil	United Kingdom	The barque was wrecked. Her crew were rescued on 7 April by the steamship Saint-Laurent (France).
Fleur de Maria	United Kingdom	The brigantine was driven ashore at Sandgate, Kent. She was on a voyage from South Shields, County Durham to Guernsey, Channel Islands. She was refloated and taken in to Dover, Kent in a leaky condition.
Noel Raphael	France	The brig was wrecked on the Seven Stones Reef. Her crew were rescued by Mincarlo (United Kingdom). Noel Raphael was on a voyage from Nantes, Loire-Inférieure to Swansea, Glamorgan.

== 25 March ==
List of shipwrecks: 25 March 1867
Ship	State	Description
Ark	United Kingdom	The ship ran aground on the Haisborough Sands, in the North Sea off the coast of Norfolk and was abandoned by her crew. She was subsequently taken in to Great Yarmouth, Norfolk by a smack.
Camilla	Grand Duchy of Mecklenburg-Schwerin	The barque was driven ashore and wrecked at Carrickfergus, County Antrim. United Kingdom.
Commerciante	Portugal	The ship was wrecked at Cabo de Bico. She was on a voyage from Porto to Lisbon.
Confidence	United Kingdom	The ship was driven ashore and wrecked at Fethard, County Wexford. She was on a voyage from Charleston, South Carolina, United States to Liverpool, Lancashire.
Diana	Sweden	The barque foundered in the Atlantic Ocean. Her crew were rescued. She was on a voyage from New York, United States to Queenstown, County Cork, United Kingdom.
Jonkheer	Netherlands	The East Indiaman went ashore on rocks in Mount's Bay near Polurrian, Cornwall, United Kingdom during a storm with the loss of 21 of the 22 people on board. The survivor, a Greek sailor, climbed the cliff in Mullion parish and was discovered the following morning. She was on a voyage from Samarang, Netherlands East Indies to Rotterdam, South Holland.
Onward	United Kingdom	The paddle tug collided with another vessel and sank at South Shields, County Durham. She was refloated the next day. Subsequently repaired and returned to service.
Quick	United States	The ship was wrecked in the Oregon Inlet with the loss of five of her crew. She was on a voyage from Málaga, Spain to an American port.
St. Elmo	United Kingdom	The steamship was wrecked in Bullslaughter Bay. She was on a voyage from Liverpool, Lancashire to Rouen, Seine-Inférieure, France.
Verona	Flag unknown	The steamship was driven ashore at Swinemünde, Prussia.
Wasp	(United Kingdom of Great Britain and Ireland) Cape Colony	The ship capsized in Table Bay in a squall with the loss of all hands.

== 26 March ==
List of shipwrecks: 26 March 1867
Ship	State	Description
Clio	United Kingdom	The barque was abandoned. Her crew were rescued by City of Kandy (United Kingdom). Clio was on a voyage from Liverpool, Lancashire to Benin, Africa.
Galilee	United Kingdom	The ship struck a sunken rock off Cape Point, Cape Colony and put in to Table Bay.
Jonah King	United Kingdom	The schooner ran aground on the Maplin Sand, in the North Sea off the coast of Essex.
New Hampshire	United Kingdom	The ship foundered in the Atlantic Ocean. Her crew were rescued by Koomar (United States). New Hampshire was on a voyage from South Shields, County Durham to Bombay, India.
Nicolo	Austrian Empire	The schooner was driven ashore at Holyhead, Anglesey, United Kingdom. She was on a voyage from Liverpool, Lancashire, United Kingdom to Buenos Aires, Argentina. Her fourteen crew were taken off on 30 March by the Holyhead Lifeboat.
Robert	United Kingdom	The brig was driven ashore and wrecked at Aberdeen. Her five crew were rescued by rocket apparatus.
Sir Robert Campbell	United Kingdom	The brig was driven ashore and wrecked at Howth, County Dublin.
Tamarac	United Kingdom	The ship was driven ashore at Glenbrook, County Cork. She was on a voyage from Newport, Monmouthshire to Dordrecht, South Holland, Netherlands.

== 27 March ==
List of shipwrecks: 27 March 1867
Ship	State	Description
Albion	United Kingdom	The brigantine was driven ashore on Arranmore, County Donegal. She was on a voyage from Cardiff, Glamorgan to Tralee, County Kerry. She was refloated but found to be leaky.
Aurora	Italy	The barque was driven ashore at Lewes, Delaware, United States. She was on a voyage from Philadelphia, Pennsylvania, United States to Cork, United Kingdom. She was refloated on 10 May and towed in to Philadelphia for repairs.
Conquest	United Kingdom	The ship was driven ashore in the Dardanelles. She was on a voyage from Galaţi, Ottoman Empire to a British port. She was refloated on 30 March and taken in to Constantinople, Ottoman Empire in a leaky condition.
Montmorency	United Kingdom	The ship was destroyed by fire at Napier, New Zealand. She had arrived with immigrants from the United Kingdom on the 24th. They had all disembarked, and the crew abandoned the ship during the fire, but all cargo was lost.
Nevin	United Kingdom	The schooner ran aground in Loch Indaal. She was on a voyage from Bangor to Galway.
Osprey	United Kingdom	The schooner collided with Georges (United Kingdom) and foundered in the Bristol Channel 60 nautical miles (110 km) off Lundy Island, Devon with the loss of two of her crew. Survivors were rescued by Georges. Osprey was on a voyage from Morocco to Queenstown, County Cork.
St. Elmo	United Kingdom	The ship was wrecked in Bullslaughter Bay, Pembrokeshire.

== 28 March ==
List of shipwrecks: 28 March 1867
Ship	State	Description
Camillo Cavour	Italy	The ship was driven ashore and wrecked at Genoa. Her crew were rescued. She was on a voyage from the Chincha Islands, Peru to Genoa.
Friedrich	Bremen	The ship collided with the steamship City of Antwerp (United Kingdom) and sank in the Irish Sea 20 nautical miles (37 km) north east of the Tuskar Rock Lighthouse. Her crew were rescued by City of Antwerp. Friedrich was on a voyage from New York, United States to Liverpool, Lancashire, United Kingdom.
Georgina	United Kingdom	The ship was driven ashore near Appledore, Devon. She was on a voyage from Liverpool to Messina, Sicily, Italy.
Pacifico	Italy	The ship was driven ashore and wrecked at Genoa. Her crew were rescued. She was on a voyage from Cardiff, Glamorgan, United Kingdom to Genoa.
Town of Preston	United Kingdom	The ship ran aground on the Middle Bank, in the Irish Sea off the coast of Lancashire. She was on a voyage from Warrenpoint, County Antrim to Preston, Lancashire. She was refloated and was beached at Lytham St. Annes, Lancashire. Her crew were rescued.
Tweedsdale	United Kingdom	The barque was driven ashore at Innellan, Argyllshire. She was on a voyage from the Clyde to Quebec City, Province of Canada, British North America. She was refloated and resumed her voyage.
Victoria	Italy	The schooner was driven ashore at Malpica de Bergantiños, Spain. Her crew were rescued. She was on a voyage from Newcastle upon Tyne, Northumberland, United Kingdom to Venice, Kingdom of Lombardy–Venetia.

== 29 March ==
List of shipwrecks: 29 March 1867
Ship	State	Description
Branch	United Kingdom	The schooner ran aground on the Navestone, off the coast of Northumberland and was abandoned by her crew. She was on a voyage from Inverness to London. She was refloated and taken in to North Sunderland, County Durham.
Harmony	United Kingdom	The brig was driven ashore and wrecked at Bideford, Devon. Her three crew were rescued by the Appledore Lifeboat Hope ( Royal National Lifeboat Institution).
Hound	United States	The ship was driven ashore on Long Island, New York. She was on a voyage from Kingston, Jamaica to New York City. She was refloated on 3 April.
Nummer 6	Prussia	The schooner was driven ashore and wrecked on "Matchaprorgo Island". Her crew survived. She was on a voyage from London to Philadelphia, Pennsylvania, United States.

== 30 March ==
List of shipwrecks: 30 March 1867
Ship	State	Description
Brabo	United Kingdom	The ship ran aground on the Scroby Sands, Norfolk. She was on a voyage from Newcastle upon Tyne, Northumberland to Philadelphia, Pennsylvania, United States. She was refloated taken in to Great Yarmouth, Norfolk for repairs.
Earl of Dublin	United Kingdom	The paddle steamer was driven ashore near Ballyhalbert, County Down and was wrecked. She was on a voyage from Glasgow, Renfrewshire to Dublin. She was subsequently refloated and taken in to Belfast, County Antrim, where she arrived on 1 July 1868. Repaired by Harland and Wolff and returned to service on 19 August 1869 as Duke of Edinburgh.
Isabella and Jane	United Kingdom	The ship was driven ashore and wrecked at Whitby, Yorkshire. Her crew were rescued.
Orient	United Kingdom	The steamship ran aground at Torekov, Sweden. She was on a voyage from Leith, Lothian to Stettin.

== 31 March ==
List of shipwrecks: 31 March 1867
Ship	State	Description
Concurrent	United Kingdom	The ship was driven ashore at Brouwershaven, Zeeland, Netherlands.
Jesse Jamieson	United Kingdom	The ship was driven ashore on Goeree-Overflakkee, Zeeland. She was on a voyage from Java, Netherlands East Indies to a Dutch port.
La Prudence	France	The schooner was driven ashore and wrecked at Sea Palling, Norfolk, United Kingdom. Her six crew were rescued by the Palling Lifeboat. She was on a voyage from Newcastle upon Tyne, Northumberland, United Kingdom to Seville, Spain.
Nicolina	United Kingdom	The ship was wrecked on Papa Stronsay, Orkney Islands. She was on a voyage from Newcastle upon Tyne to Newhaven, Connecticut, United States.
O. P. Q.	United Kingdom	The ship struck a sunken wreck off Great Yarmouth, Norfolk. She was on a voyage from Newcastle upon Tyne to London. She put in to Lowestoft, Suffolk, where she sank.

== Unknown date ==
List of shipwrecks: Unknown date in March 1867
Ship	State	Description
Achilles	United Kingdom	The barque was abandoned in the Atlantic Ocean before 18 March. Her crew were rescued by China (United Kingdom).
Achilles	United Kingdom	The steamship was driven ashore at Cape Hellas. She was refloated.
Ada G. York	United Kingdom	The ship was wrecked at Halifax, Nova Scotia, British North America before 14 March. She was on a voyage from New Orleans, Louisiana to Liverpool, Lancashire.
Aimable Virginie	France	The schooner foundered in the English Channel. Her crew were rescued by the barque Phœbus (United Kingdom). Aimable Virginie was on a voyage from Auray, Morbihan to Seville, Spain.
Andalusia	United States	The steamship was destroyed by fire off Cape Hatteras, North Carolina. She was on a voyage from New York to Charleston, South Carolina.
Annie	United Kingdom	The ship was driven ashore at Cárdenas, Cuba.
Belle Wood	United Kingdom	The ship ran aground at the mouth of the Mississippi River. She was on a voyage from New Orleans to Liverpool.
Britannia	United Kingdom	The ship was abandoned in the Atlantic Ocean.
Caberfeigh	United Kingdom	The ship was wrecked on the Owers Sandbank. Her five crew were rescued by the yacht Urania (United Kingdom).
Carron	United Kingdom	The brig was wrecked on Patterson's Rocks. She was on a voyage from Troon, Ayrshire to Cuba.
C. E. Rosenburg	United Kingdom	The ship was driven ashore on the Tabasco coast. She was on a voyage from Aspinwall, United States of Colombia to Cuba.
Clopman	Denmark	The ship was sunk by ice at Odense.
Clutha	United Kingdom	The ship was driven ashore at "Point Mainide". She was on a voyage from Bombay, India to Zanzibar.
Eliza	United Kingdom	The ship was driven ashore on Martín García Island, Uruguay.
Eliza Young	United Kingdom	The barque ran aground at Navy Island, New Brunswick, British North America. She was on a voyage from Saint John, New Brunswick to Dublin. She was consequently condemned.
Emma	United Kingdom	The ship ran aground on a sunken wreck off the Norfolk coast and was abandoned. Her crew were rescued by Sisters (United Kingdom). Emma was on a voyage from Newcastle upon Tyne, Northumberland to Devonport, Devon.
Fido	Hamburg	The ship foundered in the Atlantic Ocean. She was on a voyage from Aux Cayes, Haiti to Hamburg.
Fortuna	Bremen	The barque was struck by lightning and severely damaged at Galveston, Texas, United States.
Foscano	United States	The ship was abandoned in the Atlantic Ocean before 20 March.
Gambia	United Kingdom	The schooner was run down and sunk by the brig Aeron Vale (United Kingdom). Her crew were rescued by Aeron Vale. Gambia was on a voyage from Pomaron, Portugal to Liverpool.
George	Prussia	The brig foundered in the Atlantic Ocean. Her crew were rescued by the brig Celandine (United Kingdom). George was on a voyage from Liverpool to Galaţi, Ottoman Empire.
Georgia	United Kingdom	The steamship was driven ashore on Cape Sable Island, Nova Scotia.
Glenlee	United Kingdom	The ship was abandoned before 2 March. She was on a voyage from Madras, India to London.
Golden Sunset	United Kingdom	The ship was wrecked on Enderbury Island, Phoenix Islands before 14 March. She was on a voyage from an Australian port to San Francisco, California.
Harriet	Austrian Empire	The barque was abandoned in the Atlantic Ocean 30 nautical miles (56 km) off Cape Clear Island, County Cork, United Kingdom. Her crew were rescued by the barque Franzalvis ( Austrian Empire).
Henry	(United Kingdom of Great Britain and Ireland) New Zealand	The schooner went ashore and was wrecked on Māhia Peninsula towards the end of the month. All hands were saved.
Hippolytus	(United Kingdom of Great Britain and Ireland) Jersey	The brig was abandoned in the Atlantic Ocean. Her crew were rescued by Advance ( (United Kingdom of Great Britain and Ireland) British North America). Hippolytus was on a voyage from Saint-Malo, Ille-et-Vilaine, France to Llanelly, Glamorgan, United Kingdom.
Ida Mcleod	United States	The ship was lost before 26 March. She was on a voyage from Philadelphia, Pennsylvania to Rotterdam, South Holland, Netherlands.
Ine Alexandra	Flag unknown	The derelict ship was driven ashore at Skegness, Lincolnshire.
J. C. Nickels	United States	The barque was driven ashore and wrecked in the Bay of Santa Cruz, Tenerife, Canary Islands.
Joren Heretta	Spain	The ship was driven ashore and wrecked on Tenerife. Her crew were rescued.
Lotus	Bremen	The brig was wrecked at Cartagena, Spain. Her crew were rescued.
Maddalina	Italy	The brig was abandoned in the Atlantic Ocean 120 nautical miles (220 km) south west of Cape Clear Island. Her crew were rescued by Clans Tomeson (Norway). She was on a voyage from Sulina, Ottoman Empire to Queenstown, County Cork.
Marine	(United Kingdom of Great Britain and Ireland) British North America	The brigantine foundered off Saint Kitts. Her crew survived, three reaching Saint Kitts, the rest were rescued by Devonshire (United Kingdom).
Mary Glover	United States	The ship was driven ashore on Vancouver Island.
Pelegana	Spain	The ship was driven ashore and wrecked on Tenerife. Her crew were rescued.
Pilgrim	United Kingdom	The ship was driven ashore near Savannah, Georgia, United States. She was on a voyage from New Orleans to Liverpool.
Reflect	United Kingdom	The ship sank at Buenos Aires, Argentina. She was on a voyage from Liverpool to Buenos Aires.
Sicilian	United States	The barque was driven ashore at Chelsea, Massachusetts. She was on a voyage from Messina, Sicily, Italy to Boston, Massachusetts. She had been refloated by 12 March and towed in to Boston.
St. George	United Kingdom	The ship was destroyed by fire at Dixcove, Gold Coast.
Tuscano	United Kingdom	The barque was abandoned in the Atlantic Ocean. She was on a voyage from Liverpool to Charleston, South Carolina, United States. She was discovered on 2 April by the barque Annie Troope ( (United Kingdom of Great Britain and Ireland) British North America), which towed her in to Queenstown.
Washington	United States	The ship was driven ashore and wrecked on Vancouver Island.
