= Largy Waterfall =

Small waterfall in the south-west of County Donegal in Ulster

- County Donegal's Secret Waterfall or South Donegal's Secret Waterfall
- Location: Largy, a hamlet located a few miles west of Killybegs in the south-west of County Donegal
- Watercourse: Largy Burn

Largy Waterfall is a small waterfall located in the south-west of County Donegal in Ulster, the northern province in Ireland. The coastal waterfall is in Largy, a hamlet just west of Fintra Strand, a few miles west of Killybegs. The waterfall is often popularly known as County Donegal's Secret Waterfall or South Donegal's Secret Waterfall.

== Location and description ==
The waterfall is on the southern outskirts of Largy (Irish: Leargaidh, meaning 'Slope' or 'Hillside'), a hamlet and sub-townland through which runs the R263, the main Killybegs to Glencolumbkille road. The waterfall, which suddenly became famous in 2017, is just south of the R263. The hamlet of Largy is situated between Killybegs and Kilcar, the hamlet being a short distance west of Fintra Strand. The waterfall is located at the southern end of the townland of Largysillagh, the feature being immediately south of the Largy Viewing Point.

The feature is inside a largely roofless cave, on the coastline of South Donegal. The waterfall is formed by the Largy Burn flowing over a small cliff inside the cave, with the burn then flowing directly into the sea from the cave. In the Ulster Scots dialect, a 'burn' is a stream or small river. The cave opens out onto Donegal Bay, which is an inlet of the North Atlantic.

== Access and safety ==
Public access to Largy Waterfall is currently not straightforward. Both the waterfall and the lane giving access to it are privately owned; so, ideally, the prior permission of the landowner should be sought before trying to access the site.

The waterfall is in a rather secluded location, despite its proximity to the hamlet of Largy. The cave where the waterfall is located is on the coast, and is tidal because of this. Extreme caution should always be exercised by people visiting the waterfall, as one can become trapped inside the cave when the tide comes in. The waterfall should only ever be visited when the tide is well out. Appropriate footwear and clothing should always be worn by people visiting the waterfall, as the rocks at the entrance to the cave are usually very slippery.

While the waterfall is only a short distance directly south of Largy Viewing Point, the easiest and safest way for the public to access the waterfall is via a nearby privately owned lane. The entrance to this narrow lane is a short walk (around 273½ yards or 250 metres) north-east (towards Fintra) from the small carpark at Largy Viewing Point. However, this necessitates people walking along a short stretch of the R263, the main Killybegs to Glencolumbkille road, in order to reach this lane. At this point, the R263 is on what locals would call a 'brae' (the Ulster-Scots word for a steep incline), this stretch being a bendy and extremely busy road, with no footpaths running alongside it. Again, extreme caution should be exercised by people walking along the verges of this stretch of the R263. Cars and other vehicles should never be parked along the verges of this stretch of the main road; vehicles of visitors should only be parked in the small carpark at Largy Viewing Point.

The lane giving access to Largy Waterfall does not lead directly to the waterfall. This lane runs down a steep 'brae', which brings visitors to the bottom of some low sea cliffs. The entrance to the cave where the waterfall is located is a short distance south-west from the bottom of the lane. Visitors must scramble across the rocks at the bottom of these cliffs in order to get to the cave. The cave can only be accessed on foot when the tide is out.

== Possible 'promontory fort' ==
The remains of an ancient 'enclosure', which may have been a fortification, are located right beside Largy Waterfall. This 'enclosure' is marked as being a 'promontory fort' on the current O.S.I. Discovery Series map of the area. Not much now remains above ground of this 'enclosure' or possible fortification. The roughly rectangular site is located at the top of a low sea cliff, immediately to the east-south-east of Largy Waterfall, the enclosure being at the southern end of the townland of Largysillagh. The site of this coastal enclosure is privately owned, with strictly no public access without the landowner's prior permission. The remains of the 'enclosure' are in a dangerous cliff-top location, with extreme caution being advised for anyone who has gained permission to visit it.
