= R230 road (Ireland) =

Road in Ireland

Coordinates: 54.740150°N 8.448856°W

R230 road
- Bóthar R230
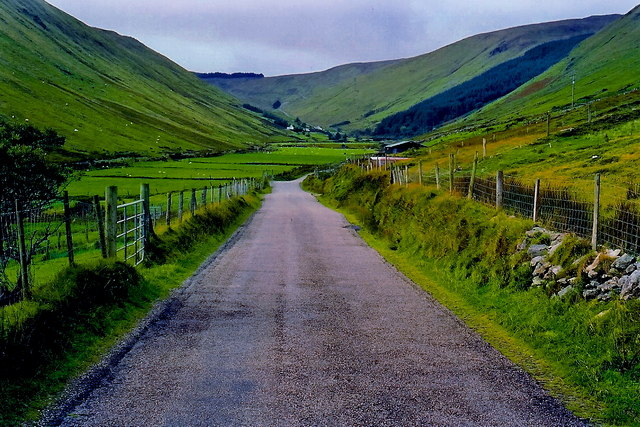
- R230 passing through the Glengesh Pass

Route information
- Length: 23.2 km (14.4 mi)

Major junctions
- From: R263 Glencolumbkille
- Crosses Glen River and Owenteskiny River
- To: N56 Common Bridge

Location
- Country: Ireland

Highway system
- Roads in Ireland; Motorways; Primary; Secondary; Regional

The R230 road is a regional road in Ireland, located in County Donegal.

== Former route ==
The R230 was originally used as a continuation of the A46 west into County Donegal from the border crossing at Corry/Cloghore (near Belleek) to the N15 in Ballyshannon. This became a detached section of the N3 in 1994; the section in Ballyshannon was later downgraded to the R936 when the town was bypassed.
