= Teelin =

Village in County Donegal, Ireland

Teileann Teelin
- Village
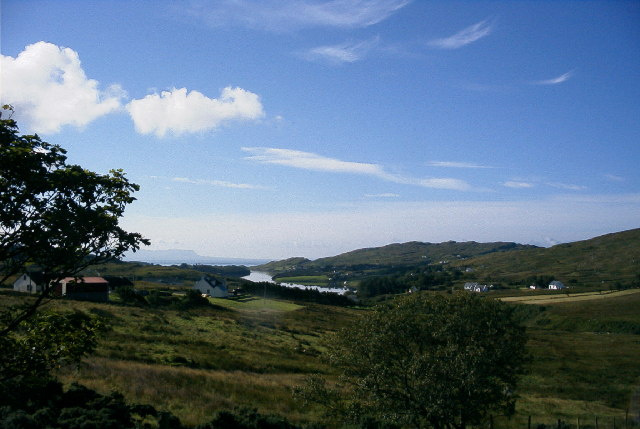
- Teileann in August 2003

- Location in Ireland
- Coordinates: 54°37′55″N 8°38′44″W
- Country: Ireland
- Province: Ulster
- County: County Donegal
- Barony: Banagh

Population
  - Urban: 300
- Irish Grid Reference: G580765
- Teileann is the only official name. The anglicised spelling Teelin has no official status, but is still widely used.

Teileann (Irish pronunciation: [tʲɛlʲən̪ˠ]; an Irish word meaning "dish"; anglicised as Teelin /ˈtiːlɪn/) is a Gaeltacht village in the south-west of County Donegal in the west of Ulster, the northern province in Ireland. The village is near Slieve League, at the northwest end of Donegal Bay. Its population is about 250–300.

The village is noted for fishing, scuba diving, and traditional music. It has a fine, deep harbour at Teelin Pier, which has boat-launching facilities with safe mooring. The pier was built in the early 1880s. It is an Irish-speaking community, and has been the subject of many linguistic studies.

Teileann means "dish" in the Irish language. The "dish" being referenced here is the part of Teelin Bay beside Teelin Pier, this part of the bay being circular like a dish or plate. A Holy well (Tobar na mBan Naoimh) or The Well of the Holy Women is located above Teelin harbour. Fishermen routinely salute the well as they venture out to sea.

Teelin is home to Coláiste Aoidh Mhic Bhricne, an Irish-language college, which attracts teenagers from across the province of Ulster. The college has been open in its current existence since 1955.

Teelin was one of the first settlements to appear on maps of Ireland, as it was an important port.

Folklorist Seán Ó hEochaidh (Seán Haughey) was from Teelin.

== See also ==
- The Battle of Doire Leathan was fought near Teelin on 14 September 1590, in Doire Leathan (Derrylahan), a townland on the opposite shore of Teelin Bay.
- List of towns and villages in the Republic of Ireland
