= R263 road (Ireland) =

Road in County Donegal, Ireland

Coordinates: 54.650948°N 8.424028°W

R263 road
- Bóthar R263
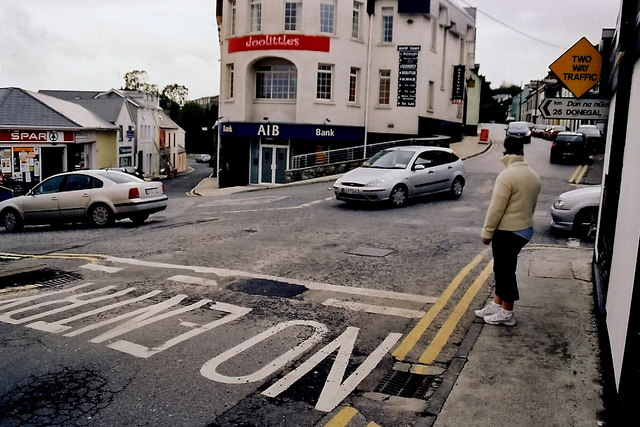
- R263 as it enters Killybegs

Route information
- Length: 37.0 km (23.0 mi)

Major junctions
- From: N56 Aghayeevoge
- R230 Glencolmcille; Passes through Killybegs
- To: Malinbeg

Location
- Country: Ireland

Highway system
- Roads in Ireland; Motorways; Primary; Secondary; Regional

The R263 road is a regional road in County Donegal, Ireland.

The official description of the R263 from the Roads Act 1993 (Classification of Regional Roads) Order 2012 reads:

R263: Aghayeevoge — Killybegs — Málainn Bhig, County Donegal

Between its junction with N56 at Aghayeevoge and its terminal point at Trabane via Corporation; Main Street and New Row in the town of Killybegs; Fintragh Bridge, Bavan, Droim na Fionagaile, Caiseal Charna, Cill Chathasaigh, An Charrig, Mín na bhFachran, An Caiseal, Cill Fhathnaid, Dún Ailt, Málainn Mhóir, Droichead Chroimghlinne and Málainn Bhig all in the county of Donegal.
