= Muckross Head =

Peninsula in County Donegal, Ireland

Coordinates: 54.612989°N 8.584871°W

- Interactive map of Muckross Head

Administration
- Ireland

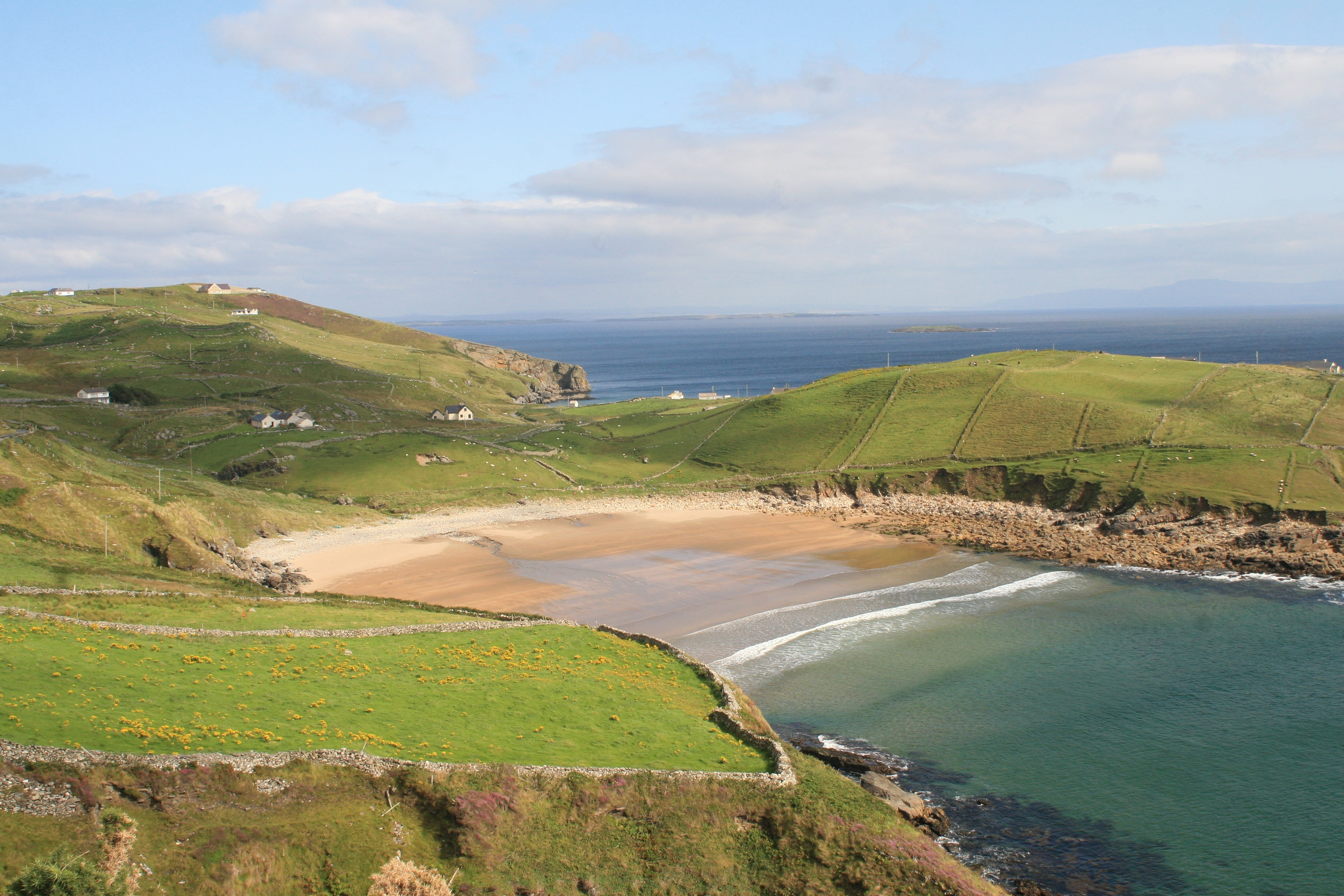
Muckross Peninsula, County Donegal.

Muckross Head is a small peninsula in the parish of Kilcar about 10 km west of Killybegs, County Donegal, in north-western Ireland. It contains a popular rock-climbing area, noted for its unusual horizontally layered structure.

== Overview ==
Muckross Head has two beaches, one of which is popular with surfers. That beach (Trá na nGlór in Irish, or "Beach of the Noise") has a rip tide, coming in at both sides and sucking out in the middle, but is not particularly dangerous. The other beach (Trá Bán, meaning "White Beach" in Irish) some hundreds of metres away is a popular family beach which is safe for swimming but has a risk of rockfall. That beach also has a public car park and toilets in summer.

The area is referred to in a 1732 survey of the Murray-Hamilton estate, of which it was a small part (see PRONI in Belfast). The survey referred to a house "on the point" occupied by a Mr Murray (probably the principal tenant who would have had many peasant subtenants not referred to in the survey), but there are no traces today of the house.

The Head has a public monument on its extreme tip. The plaque warning against interference has rusted away, leaving an ugly concrete base. The monument consists of a Neolithic wall which ran across the headland and was possibly defensive in character, but little of it is left as its stones were useful in building farmhouses and outhouses on the headland. The monument is known locally as 'The Market House'. The origin of the name is not known for certain, but it was a location for selling local farm produce and livestock such as sheep, pigs and cattle. This is probably why it was given this name.

The headland has a rich fauna and also a small area of exposed limestone karst. In some places along the headland there are deposits of fossils, mainly of seaweeds and shellfish.

The headland is at the base of a c. 250 m hill known locally as Muckross Hill.

The nearest village is Kilcar, which is approx 3 km to the west.

The island of Inisduff (Irish - Black Island) is situated about 5 km south east of Muckross Head, in Donegal Bay. It is a small uninhabited island and featureless but is a prominent sight from the coast road between Killybegs and Kilcar.

== Climbing ==
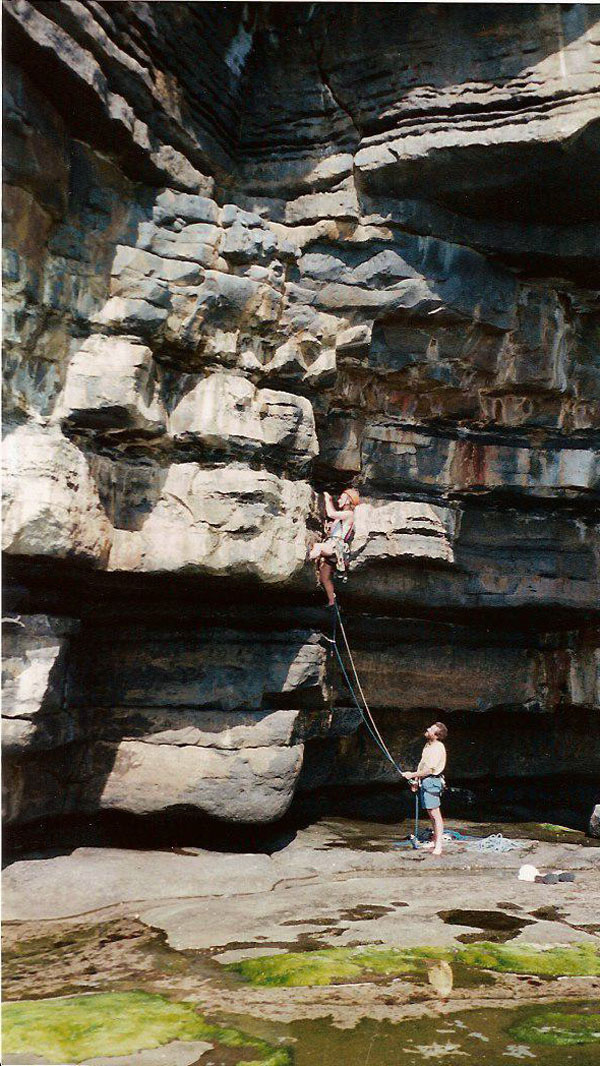
A climber starting The Barb, an E1/5b climb at Muckross Head.

The Muckross crag is small and remote from major population centres, but it is quite popular because of the unusual climbing encountered there. It is a sea-cliff, situated above a partly tidal rock platform, and access is quite convenient.

The rock consists of horizontally layered sandstone with intervening thin layers of mudstone which have been eroded away to produce horizontal breaks and overhangs. The climbs are all single-pitch, between 10 m and 20 m in height. The overhanging nature of much of the rock makes climbing there quite strenuous, and yields some spectacular roof-climbing.

The current guidebook, published in 2015, lists over 60 climbs at Muckross, ranging in grade up to E6/6b. Climbing of all grades is available, but the higher grades predominate. In accordance with Irish climbing ethics, only traditional protection ("clean climbing") is used, medium-to-big cams being very useful.
