= Slieve League =

Mountain in County Donegal, Ireland

Coordinates: 54°38′17″N 8°40′53″W

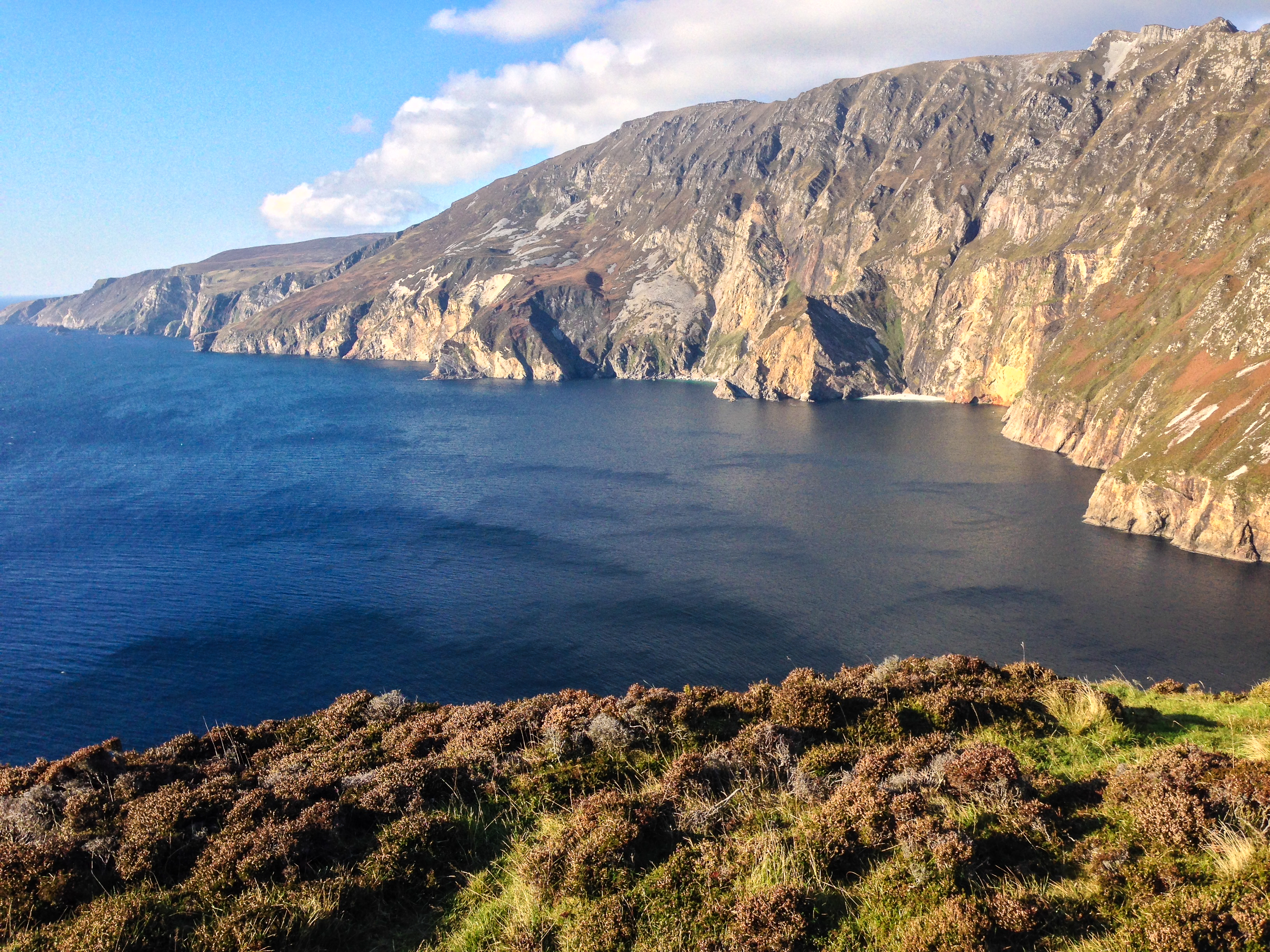

Highest point
- Elevation: 601 m (1,972 ft)
- Listing: Marilyn

Naming
- Native name: Sliabh Liag (Irish)

Geography
- Location within Ireland
- Location: County Donegal, Ireland
- OSI/OSNI grid: G544784

Slieve League (Irish: Sliabh Liag, meaning 'mountain of stone pillars') is a mountain on the Atlantic coast of County Donegal, Ireland. At 601 metres (1,972 ft), it has the second-highest sea cliffs in Ireland, after Croaghaun, and some of the highest sea cliffs in Europe.

In his 1937 memoir The Way That I Went, the Irish naturalist Robert Lloyd Praeger wrote of the location:

A tall mountain of nearly 2000 feet, precipitous on its northern side, has been devoured by the sea till the southern face forms a precipice likewise, descending on this side right into the Atlantic from the long knife-edge which forms the summit. The traverse of this ridge, the "One Man's Path", is one of the most remarkable walks to be found in Ireland - not actually dangerous, but needing a good head and careful progress on a stormy day....The northern precipice, which drops 1500 feet into the coomb surrounding the Little Lough Agh, harbours the majority of the alpine plants of Slieve League, the most varied group of alpines to be found anywhere in Donegal.

Map of Slieve League

Slieve League is often photographed from a viewpoint known as Bunglass. It can be reached by means of a narrow road that departs from Teelin. The final few kilometres of the route are built along a precipice and include several places at which the road turns at the crest of a rise.

== Image gallery ==
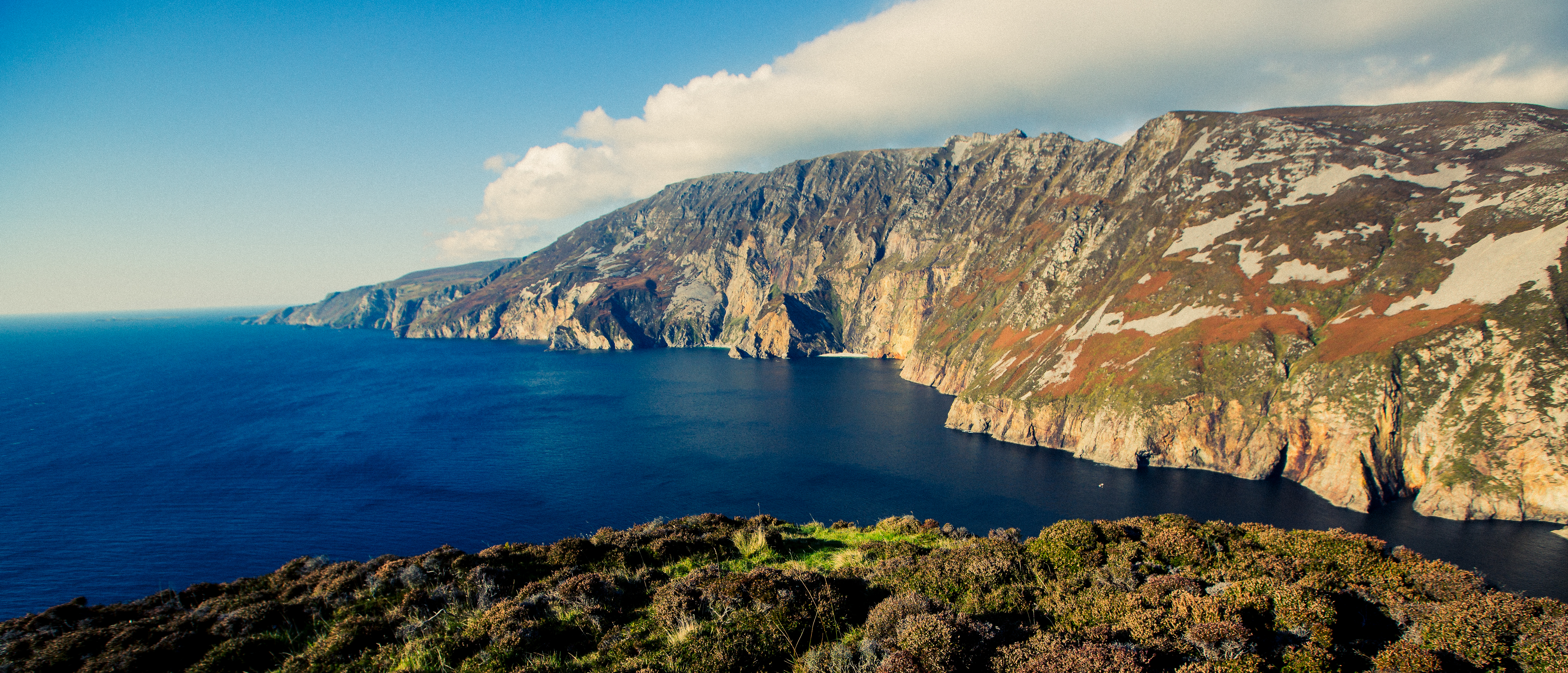
Panorama

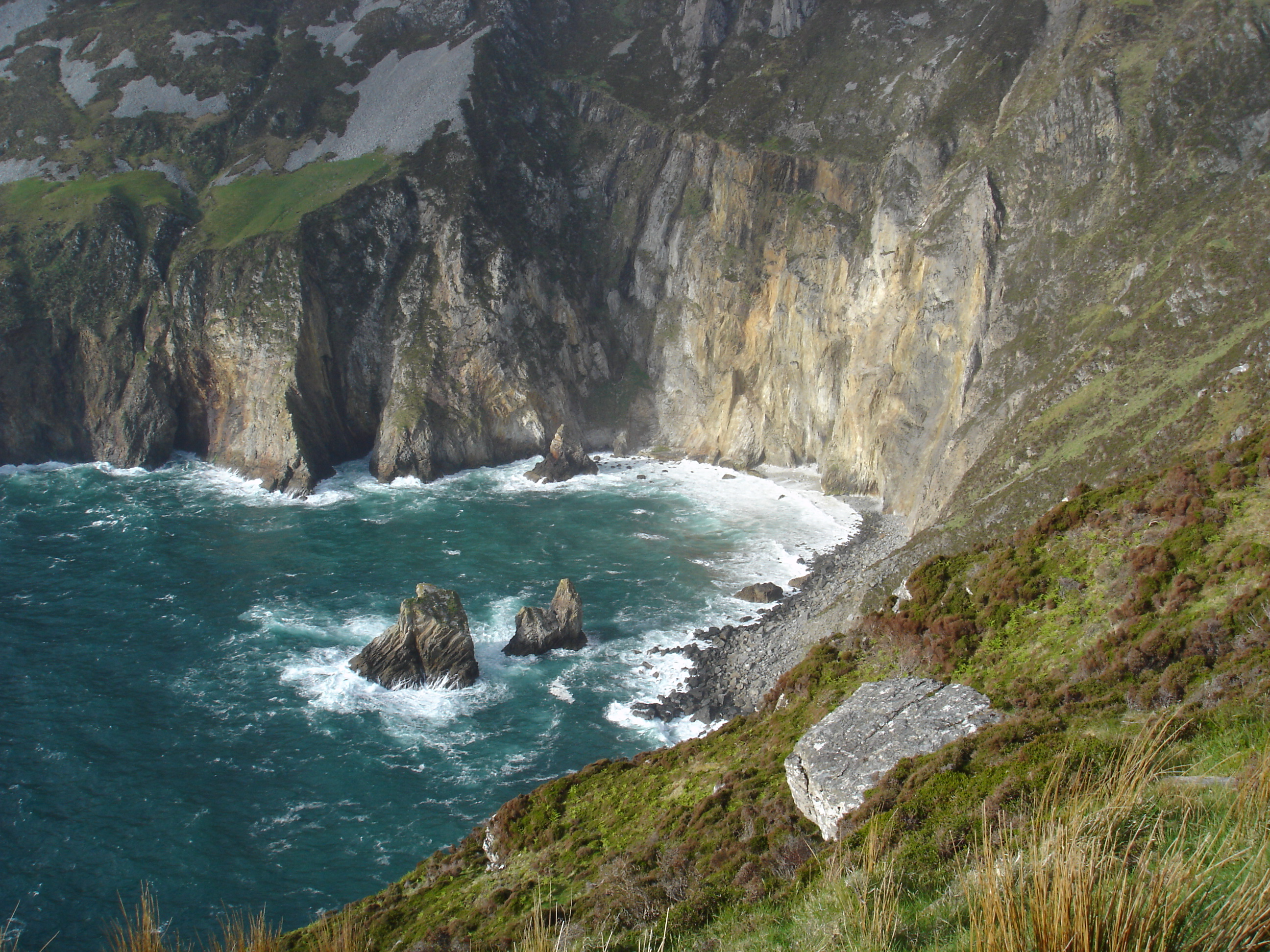
Eastern end

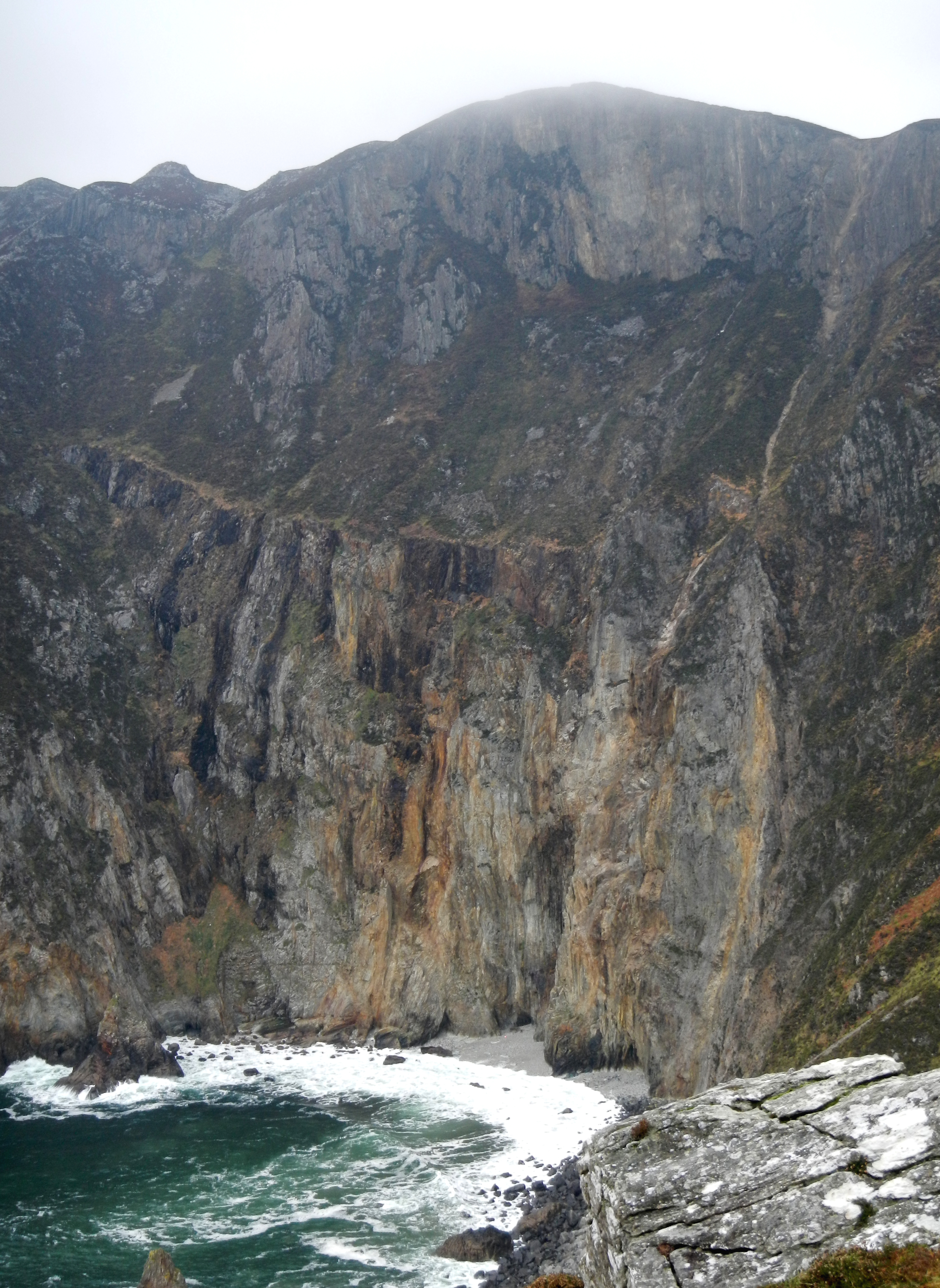
Extended view of eastern end

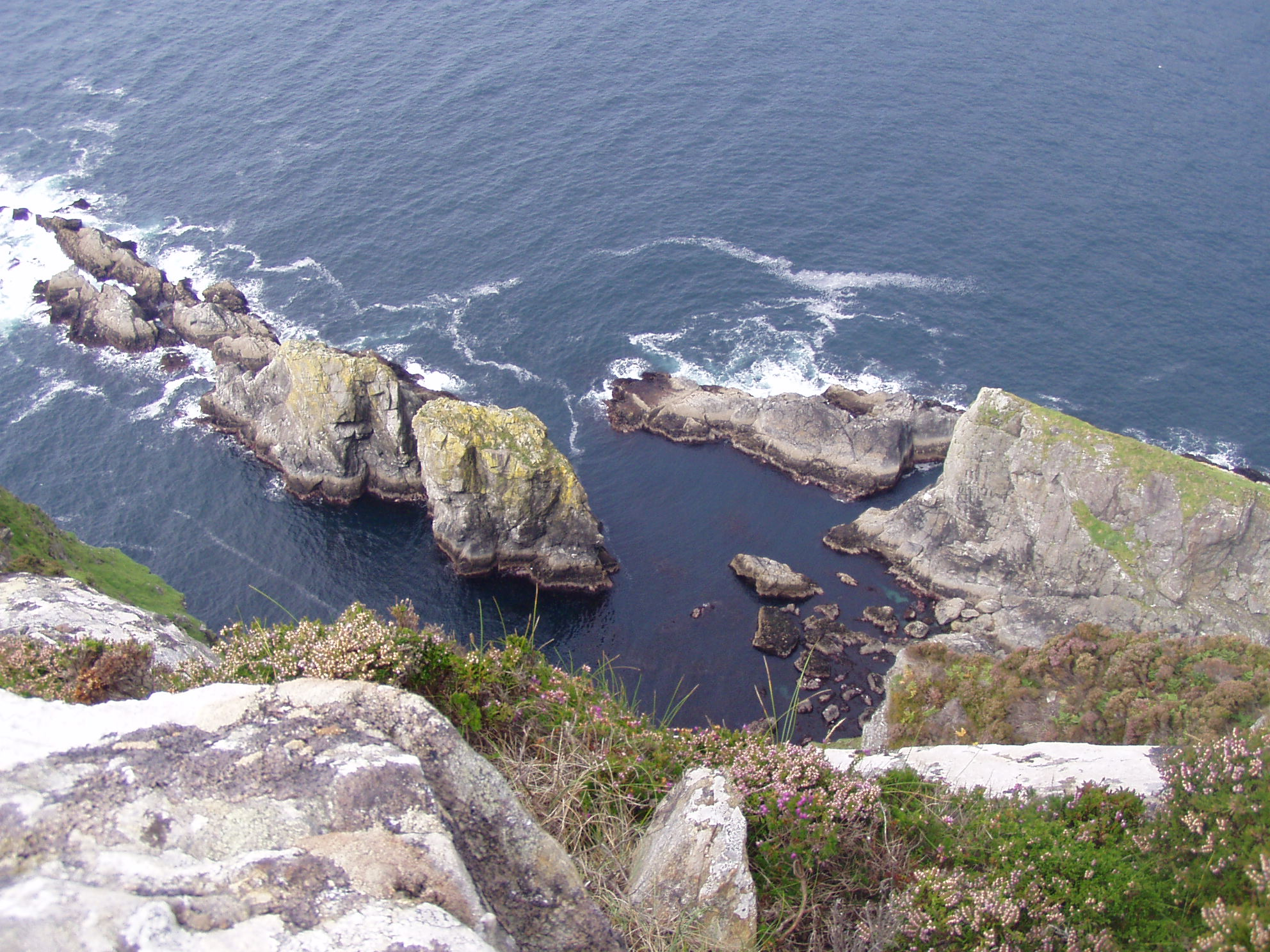
Looking down

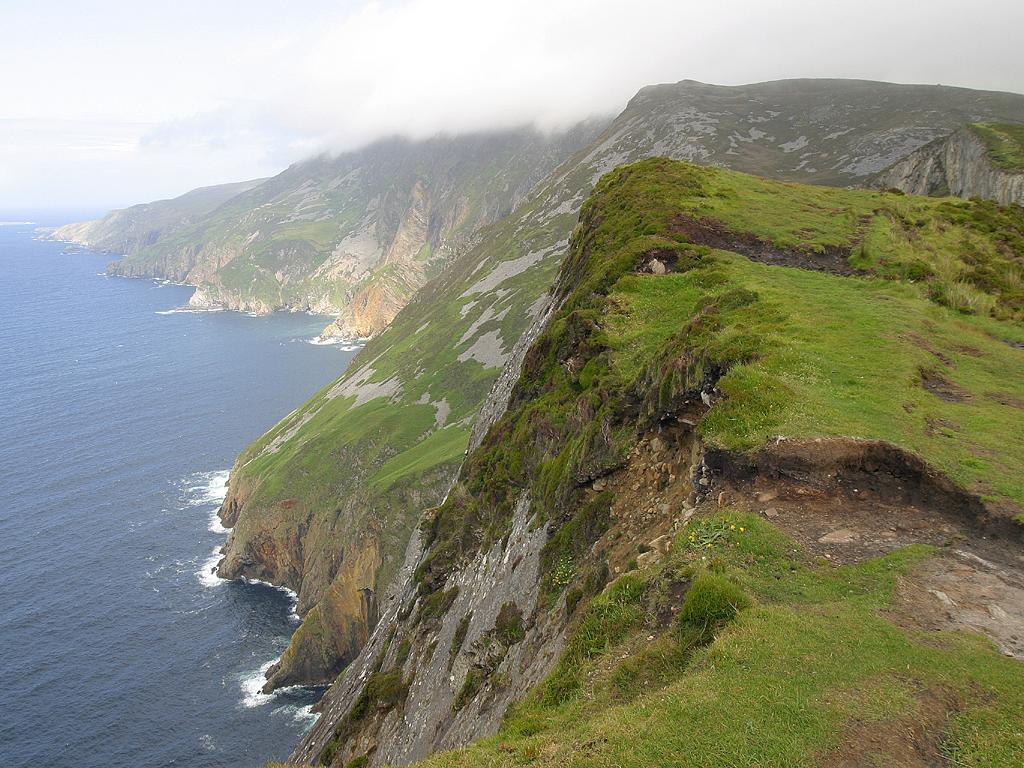
Across the top

Comparison of cliffs in Europe

== See also ==
- List of tourist attractions in Ireland
