= R231 road (Ireland) =

Road in Ireland

R231 road
- Bóthar R231
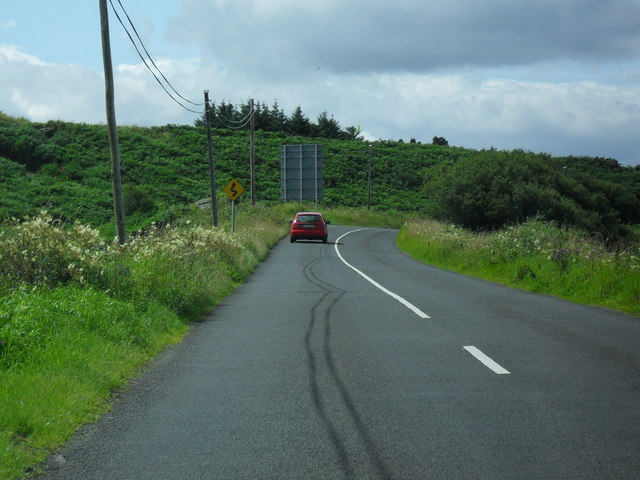
- R231 at Kilbarron, County Donegal

Route information
- Length: 14.2 km (8.8 mi)

Major junctions
- From: N15 at Coolcholly, County Donegal
- To: N15 at Ballintra

Location
- Country: Ireland

Highway system
- Roads in Ireland; Motorways; Primary; Secondary; Regional

The R231 road is a regional road in Ireland. It is a loop road from the N15 road in County Donegal. Most of the road is part of the Wild Atlantic Way.

The R231 heads west from the N15, just outside Ballyshannon. The road goes northwest before turning northeast towards the beach village of Rossnowlagh and passing Durnesh Lough. The road rejoins the N15 at Ballintra. The R231 is 14.2 km (8.8 mi) long.

== See also ==
- Roads in Ireland
