= Drumholm =

Parish in County Donegal, Ireland

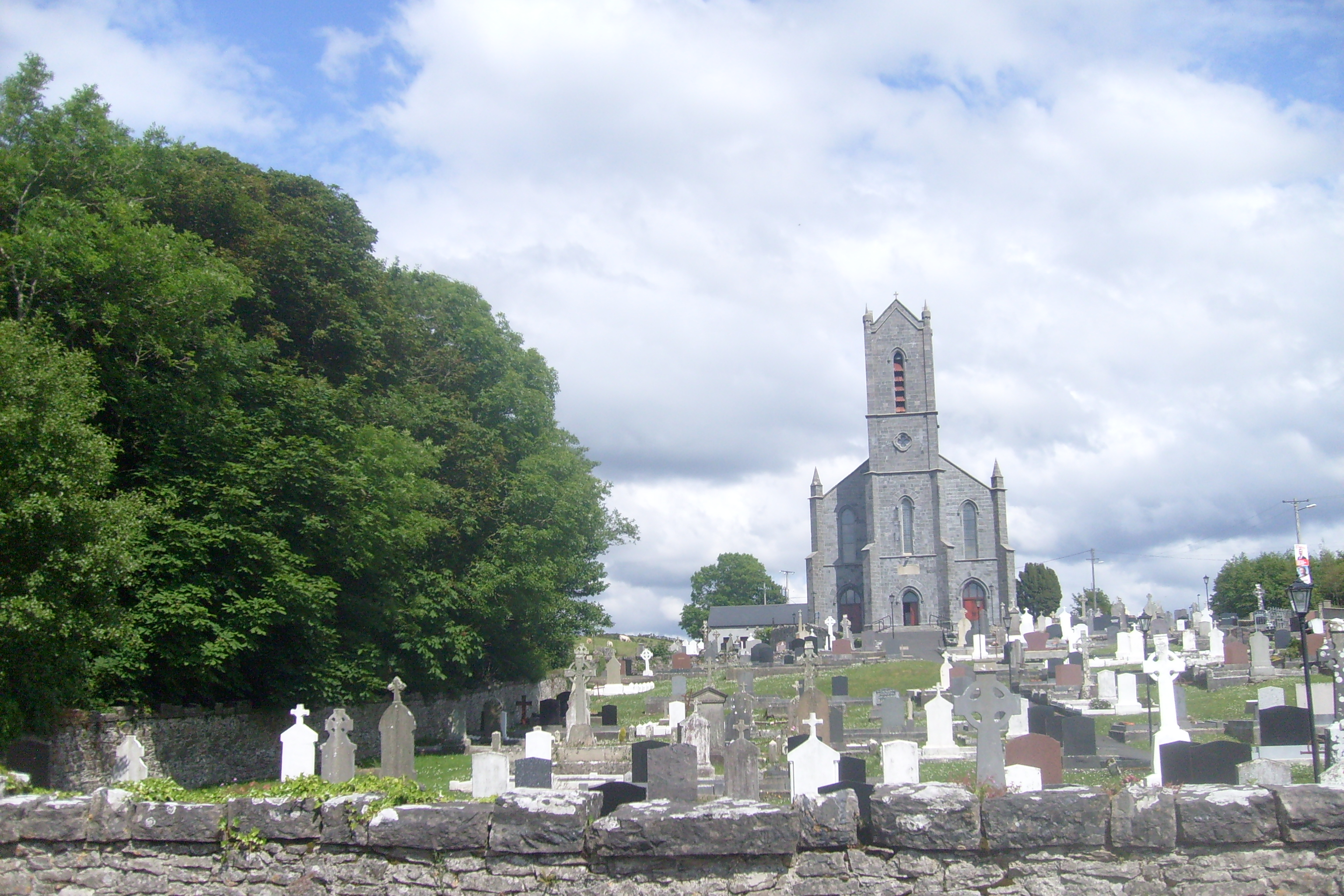
St. Bridget's Catholic Church, in Ballintra, is in the Catholic parish of Drumholm

Drumholm or Drumhome (Irish: Droim Thuama) is a civil parish in the historical barony of Tirhugh in County Donegal, Ireland. Drumholm (or Ballintra) is also a Catholic parish in the Roman Catholic Diocese of Raphoe and a Church of Ireland parish in the Diocese of Derry and Raphoe. It contains all the land between the large towns of Ballyshannon and Donegal Town, including the small villages of Laghey, Ballintra and Rossnowlagh.

== Churches ==
The Catholic parish historically had three churches: St Bridget's Church, Ballintra; The Chapel of Ease, Laghey and the Immaculate Heart of Mary Church, Rossnowlagh.

The main church, St Bridget's, was built in 1845 on the outskirts of Ballintra. This church lies in the same area as St Ernan's National School, the new and old parochial houses and St Bridget's Community Centre. The main graveyard is also located adjacent to the front of the church.

The chapel of ease, located about eight kilometres east of Laghey in the townland of Laghey Barr, is no longer used for regular services. The last mass was held in June 2003. The chapel opened in 1941 after the closure of the school which had previously been housed in the building. However, Mass had been said in its vicinity for centuries previously. Although Mass is no longer said, prayer meetings are sometimes held and the rosary is recited on Sundays.

The newest church is the Immaculate Heart of Mary in Rossnowlagh, which opened in 1952. The new friary marked the return of the Franciscan Order to County Donegal for the first time since the Four Masters and the dedication of the church in June 1952 was attended by the then Taoiseach, Éamon de Valera and President Sean T. O'Ceallaigh. It is part of the Franciscan Friary in the village. The friary has a visitors' centre and the Donegal Historical Society Museum which houses a small collection including Stone Age flints and old Irish musical instruments, as well as a garden that incorporates the Stations of the Cross.

== Patron saint ==
The patron saint of the parish is St Ernan, who is believed to have been born in the parish and to have established a monastery there. It is this saint who has given his name to St Ernan's NS, Ballintra and to the small island in Donegal Bay. He is also honoured in St Bridget's Church, Ballintra with a window above one of the two minor doors at the front of the building.

== Facilities ==
The main graveyard in Ballintra has been used since 1820 and the parish has several sets of records, including baptismal records from 1866, confirmation records from 1920, marriage records from 1866 and a death register from 1968.

Primary schools in the area include St Ernan's National School in Ballintra and St Eunan's National School in Laghey.

There is no secondary school in the parish and children from the north of the parish (mainly from Laghey NS) go to the Abbey Vocational School in Donegal Town, while those from the south of the parish (mainly from Ballintra NS) go to Coláiste Cholmcille in Ballyshannon.
