= List of shipwrecks in July 1842 =

The list of shipwrecks in July 1842 includes ships sunk, foundered, wrecked, grounded, or otherwise lost during July 1842.

== 1 July ==
List of shipwrecks: 1 July 1842
Ship	State	Description
Canadian	United Kingdom	The ship was driven ashore and wrecked at Boscastle, Cornwall.
Choice	United Kingdom	The brig foundered in the English Channel off Beer Head, Devon. Her crew were rescued by the steamship Zephyr (United Kingdom).
Christina	United Kingdom	The barque was wrecked on the West London Shoal (8°51′13″N 112°37′48″E) with the loss of eighteen of her 43 crew. She was on a voyage from Macao to Bombay, India.
Johanna Maria	Stralsund	The ship foundered off Bergen, Norway. Her crew were rescued.

== 2 July ==
List of shipwrecks: 2 July 1842
Ship	State	Description
Aurora	Danzig	The ship was driven ashore and wrecked at "Lebau". She was on a voyage from Caen, Calvados, France to Danzig.
Brisk	United Kingdom	The ship was wrecked on the Lafolle Reef, off the coast of Saint Domingo. Her crew were rescued.

== 3 July ==
List of shipwrecks: 3 July 1842
Ship	State	Description
Dean	United Kingdom	The ship was driven ashore at Youghal, County Cork. She was on a voyage from Liverpool, Lancashire to Algiers, Algeria. She was refloated on 5 July and taken into Youghal.
Edna	United States	The steamship was destroyed by a boiler explosion at the mouth of the Missouri River with the loss of about 60 lives.
Esquimaux	United Kingdom	The ship ran aground off Fort Point, Nevis. She was on a voyage from Nevis to London. She was refloated, and resumed her voyage three days later.
Gustave	Sweden	The ship ran aground on the Lemon Sand, in the North Sea. She was on a voyage from Söderhamn to Marseille, Bouches-du-Rhône, France. Gustave was refloated and taken into Great Yarmouth, Norfolk, United Kingdom.
Terra Nova	United Kingdom	The brig was wrecked on Rocky Island, in the Paracel Islands. Her crew survived. She was on a voyage from Sydney, New South Wales to Manila, Spanish East Indies.

== 4 July ==
List of shipwrecks: 4 July 1842
Ship	State	Description
Adele	United Kingdom	The ship was wrecked on a reef off "Chitlae Island", in the Laccadive Islands with the loss of 24 of her crew. She was on a voyage from Bombay, India to Mauritius.
Dean	United Kingdom	The ship was driven ashore near Youghal, County Cork. She was on a voyage from Liverpool, Lancashire to Algiers, Algeria.
Durango	United Kingdom	The ship ran aground on the Flatt Keys. She was on a voyage from the Rio de la Hacha to Saint Petersburg, Russia. She was refloated and taken into Nassau, Bahamas for repairs.
Shamrock	United Kingdom	The ship was driven ashore at Dungeness, Kent. She was refloated on 15 July and taken into Rye, Sussex.
Venus	United Kingdom	The ship foundered in the Atlantic Ocean off the Rotten Island Lighthouse, County Donegal. She was later refloated and beached.
Woodlands	United Kingdom	The ship was driven ashore on "Grand Melvan" and was severely damaged. She was on a voyage from Philadelphia, Pennsylvania, United States to St. John's, Newfoundland, British North America.

== 5 July ==
List of shipwrecks: 5 July 1842
Ship	State	Description
Enchantress	United Kingdom	The ship was driven ashore in the Estuary of Bilbao.
Leda	United Kingdom	The ship capsized in the Estuary of Bilbao. Her crew were rescued.
Medora	United Kingdom	The ship was wrecked on the Cobblers. Her crew were rescued.

== 6 July ==
List of shipwrecks: 6 July 1842
Ship	State	Description
Ada	United Kingdom	The ship was wrecked on the Ledge, off the coast of New Brunswick, British North America. She was on a voyage from Saint Vincent to Saint Andrews, New Brunswick.
Brutus	United Kingdom	The ship was wrecked on Grand Manan. She was on a voyage from Puerto Rico to Saint John, New Brunswick.
Hastings	United Kingdom	The ship ran aground on the Inner Barber Sand, in the North Sea. She was on a voyage from South Shields, County Durham to Hastings, Sussex.
Morning Star	United Kingdom	The ship was wrecked on the Duncan Reef. Her crew were rescued. She was on a voyage from Mayagüez, Puerto Rico to Halifax, Nova Scotia, British North America.

== 7 July ==
List of shipwrecks: August 1842
Ship	State	Description
Isabella	United Kingdom	The ship was wrecked on Phillips Reef, in the Turks Islands. Her crew were rescued. She was on a voyage from Halifax, Nova Scotia, British North America to Jamaica.
Sophia	United Kingdom	The ship capsized in a squall and sank in the Irish Sea off the Point of Ayre, Isle of Man with the loss of all hands.

== 9 July ==
List of shipwrecks: 9 July 1842
Ship	State	Description
Charlevoix	(United Kingdom of Great Britain and Ireland) British North America	The ship ran aground in the Saint Lawrence River. Her passengers were taken off by the steamship British American ( (United Kingdom of Great Britain and Ireland) British North America).
Louis Philippe	France	The steamship was holed by an anchor and sank at Havre de Grâce, Seine-Inférieure.
Shamrock	(United Kingdom of Great Britain and Ireland) British North America	The steamship was destroyed by a boiler explosion 5 miles (8.0 km) from Lachine. Province of Canada with the loss of 62 of the 120 people on board.

== 10 July ==
List of shipwrecks: 10 July 1842
Ship	State	Description
Adonis	United Kingdom	The ship ran aground on the Henecagua Reef. She was on a voyage from Savanilla, near Puerto Colombia, to Liverpool, Lancashire. She was refloated and taken into Nassau, Bahamas.
Emperor	United Kingdom	The ship capsized in the River Usk at Newport, Monmouthshire. She was later righted.
Kate	(United Kingdom of Great Britain and Ireland) New Zealand	The schooner was wrecked near Cape Terawhiti. She had suffered damage after hitting rocks after leaving Wellington, but the master attempted to continue her journey to Cloudy Bay. While at anchor nea Cape Terawhiti she hit a further rock which worsened the damage and led to a heavy leak. After this the schooner was deliberately run onto the reef in order to save the crew.

== 11 July ==
List of shipwrecks: 11 July 1842
Ship	State	Description
Jane McNeill	United Kingdom	The ship was wrecked on St. Peter's Island. All on board were rescued. She was on a voyage from the Bras d'Or Lake to St. John's, Newfoundland, British North America.
Marjery	United Kingdom	The ship was driven ashore between Campos dos Goytacazes and Maçanes, Brazil with the loss of a crew member. She was on a voyage from Buenos Aires, Argentina to Liverpool, Lancashire.
Racer	United Kingdom	The schooner was driven ashore, capsized and sank at Terneuzen, Zeeland, Netherlands. Her crew were rescued. She was on a voyage from Havana, Cuba to Ghent, East Flanders, Belgium. She was later raised and taken into Ghent.
Resolution	United Kingdom	The ship ran aground at King's Lynn, Norfolk. She was later refloated.
Sister	United Kingdom	The ship was wrecked on "Langlois Island". Her crew were rescued .She was on a voyage from Prince Edward Island, British North America to St. John's, Newfoundland.

== 12 July ==
List of shipwrecks: 12 July 1842
Ship	State	Description
Ada	United Kingdom	The ship was driven ashore and severely damaged in Passamaquoddy Bay. She was on a voyage from St. Stephen, New Brunswick, British North America to Liverpool, Lancashire. She was refloated.
Dunmore	United Kingdom	The schooner was driven ashore at Ocracoke, North Carolina, United States.
Friends	United Kingdom	The ship was wrecked on St Peter's Island, British North America. Her crew were rescued. She was on a voyage from St. John's, Newfoundland to Sydney, Nova Scotia.

== 13 July ==
List of shipwrecks: 13 July 1842
Ship	State	Description
Ada	United Kingdom	The ship ran aground and was severely damaged in Passamaquoddy Bay. She was on a voyage from St. Stephen, New Brunswick, British North America to Liverpool, Lancashire.
Keith Stewart	United Kingdom	The sloop foundered off the Isle of Lewis, Outer Hebrides. Her crew were rescued.
Marquis of Wellesley	United Kingdom	The ship ran aground in the Traverse. She was on a voyage from Quebec City, Province of Canada, British North America to Dublin. She was later refloated and put back to Quebec City.
Rio Doce	Brazil	The steamship ran aground and was wrecked at Rio de Janeiro. She was on a voyage from Rio de Janeiro to Rio Doce.

== 14 July ==
List of shipwrecks: 14 July 1842
Ship	State	Description
Dolores	Spain	The brig was driven ashore at the Point de Mulas, Cuba. All on board were rescued.
Keith Stewart	United Kingdom	The ship foundered in Tolsta Bay. Her crew were rescued. She was on a voyage from Falmouth, Cornwall to Liverpool, Lancashire.
Margaret Magdalene	Norway	The ship ran aground and sank on a reef north of the mouth of the Agger Canal, Denmark. Her crew were rescued. She was on a voyage from Mandahl to "Stuter".
Martha Ridgeway	United Kingdom	The barque was wrecked in the Torres Strait. Her crew were rescued by a number of ship including Hopkinson ( United Kingdom). She was on a voyage from New Zealand to India.tim
Teviot	United Kingdom	The paddle steamer was severely damaged by fire at Havana, Cuba with the loss of a crew member. She was on a voyage from Veracruz, Mexico to London. The fire was extinguished with assistance from HMS Romney (Royal Navy), the Spanish Navy and many other vessels. Following temporary repairs, she resumed her voyage on 19 July.
Water Witch	United Kingdom	The ship was driven ashore near "Teumpan Head". She was on a voyage from Saint Petersburg, Russia to Belfast, County Antrim. Water Witch was refloated and taken into Stornoway, Isle of Lewis, Outer Hebrides.

== 15 July ==
List of shipwrecks: 15 July 1842
Ship	State	Description
Lexington	United States	The schooner was abandoned in the Atlantic Ocean off Cape Hatteras, North Carolina.
Peruvian	United Kingdom	The ship was wrecked at near the River Ganges, New Brunswick, British North America. She was on a voyage from Berbice, British Honduras to St. Stephen, New Brunswick.
Soeblomsten	Norway	The ship was driven ashore on Texel, North Holland, Netherlands. She was on a voyage from Bergen to Amsterdam, North Holland.
Traveller	United Kingdom	The brig was driven ashore on Belle Isle, Newfoundland, British North America). She was on a voyage from Dalhousie, New Brunswick, British North America to Leith, Lothian. She was refloated, but consequently capsized and sank 60 nautical miles (110 km) east of Belle Isle on 17 July with the loss of three of her twelve crew.

== 16 July ==
List of shipwrecks: July 1842
Ship	State	Description
British America	(United Kingdom of Great Britain and Ireland) British North America	The steamship was run aground in the Saint Lawrence River. She was on a voyage from Quebec City to Montreal, Province of Canada. She was refloated the next day.
Dart	United Kingdom	The ship spang a leak and foundered in the English Channel south south east of Looe Island, Cornwall. She was on a voyage from Plymouth, Devon to Falmouth, Cornwall.
Ruby	United Kingdom	The ship was driven ashore and wrecked at the Old Head of Kinsale, County Cork. She was on a voyage from Liverpool, Lancashire to "Miltown".
Sophia	United Kingdom	The ship was driven ashore at Valløe, Norway. She was on a voyage from Liverpool, Lancashire to Valløe. She was refloated on 19 July and taken into Valløe.

== 17 July ==
List of shipwrecks: 17 July 1842
Ship	State	Description
Comet	United Kingdom	The ship departed from Mauritius for Algoa Bay. No further trace, presumed foundered in the Indian Ocean with the loss of all hands.

== 20 July ==
List of shipwrecks: 20 July 1842
Ship	State	Description
Arion	United Kingdom	The ship was driven ashore in Table Bay. She was consequently condemned.
Galatea	United Kingdom	The ship was driven ashore in Table Bay. She was later refloated.
Hart	United Kingdom	The ship struck a sunken rock and was beached at Tobermory, Isle of Mull, Inner Hebrides.
Henry and Wiliam	United Kingdom	The ship struck a sunken rock in the Sound of Islay and was beached. Her crew were rescued. She was on a voyage from South Shields, County Durham to Glasgow, Renfrewshire.
Sir William Wallace	United Kingdom	The steamship foundered in the English Channel 10 nautical miles (19 km) off the Goodwin Sands, Kent. Her crew were rescued by a French steamship. She was on a voyage from London to Boulogne, Pas-de-Calais, France.
Whim	United Kingdom	The ship was sighted off Gibraltar whilst on a voyage from Malta to an English port. No further trace, presumed foundered with the loss of all hands.

== 21 July ==
List of shipwrecks: 21 July 1842
Ship	State	Description
Britannia	United Kingdom	The ship was driven ashore near "Clamcove", Newfoundland, British North America. She was on a voyage from Liverpool, Lancashire to New York, United States. She was refloated but consequently foundered off Ferryland, Newfoundland on 23 July. All on board were rescued.
Pekin	United Kingdom	The ship ran aground of the Petit Reefs, off the Île-à-Vache, Haiti. She was on a voyage from Saint Thomas, Virgin Islands to Jamaica. She was refloated and sailed to Jamaica for repairs.
Thomas Lord	(United Kingdom of Great Britain and Ireland) New South Wales	The schooner ran aground off the Williams Town Lighthouse, Melbourne. She was on a voyage from Sydney to Melbourne. Thomas Lord was refloated.

== 22 July ==
List of shipwrecks: 22 July 1842
Ship	State	Description
George Cadman	United Kingdom	The ship foundered in the English Channel 5 nautical miles (9.3 km) south west of North Foreland, Kent. She was on a voyage from Christchurch, Hampshire to London.
Ocean Queen	United Kingdom	The barque ran aground at Launceston, Van Diemen's Land. She was on a voyage from London to Launceston. Ocean Queen was refloated. (However, later in the same year, struck a reef off the coast of Western Australia and was eventually abandoned).

== 23 July ==
List of shipwrecks: 23 July 1842
Ship	State	Description
Angelique	Spain	The ship was driven ashore at Pori, Grand Duchy of Finland. She was on a voyage from Cádiz to Pori.

== 24 July ==
List of shipwrecks: 24 July 1842
Ship	State	Description
Sampson	United Kingdom	The ship rann aground on the West Rocks, in the North Sea off the coast of Essex. she was refloated and put into Harwich, Essex.

== 25 July ==
List of shipwrecks: 25 July 1842
Ship	State	Description
Enigheden	Sweden	The ship was driven ashore and sank at Hjorring, Denmark. Her crew were rescued. She was on a voyage from Uddevalla to London, United Kingdom.
Salem	United States	The ship was driven ashore near Mobile, Alabama. She was on a voyage from Liverpool, Lancashire, United Kingdom to Mobile. She was refloated on 27 July.

== 29 July ==
List of shipwrecks: 29 July 1842
Ship	State	Description
Adolphe	France	The ship was wrecked on the Isla Aves, Venezuela. She was on a voyage from Martinique to Saint Domingo.
Betsey	United Kingdom	The ship was driven ashore and wrecked at Mablethorpe, Lincolnshire. Her crew were rescued.
John	United Kingdom	The sloop sprang a leak and was beached at North Sunderland, County Durham. She was on a voyage from Newcastle upon Tyne, Northumberland to Arbroath, Forfarshire. John was refloated on 6 August and taken into Berwick upon Tweed for repairs.
Pasha	United Kingdom	The ship was driven ashore in the Rabbit Islands, Ottoman Empire. She was on a voyage from Liverpool, Lancashire to Constantinople, Ottoman Empire. She was refloated with assistance from HMS Cambridge and HMS Vanguard (both Royal Navy) and arrived at Constantinople on 3 August.
Pearl	United Kingdom	The ship was beached at St. Mary's, Isles of Scilly having previously struck a sunken rock or a wreck 3 nautical miles (5.6 km) off Paimbœuf, Loire-Inférieure, France. She was on a voyage from Nantes, Loire-Inférieure to Falmouth, Cornwall.
Sarah	United Kingdom	The sloop was wrecked near Plymouth, Devon. Her crew were rescued. She was on a voyage from Liverpool, Lancashire to Plymouth.

== 30 July ==
List of shipwrecks: 30 July 1842
Ship	State	Description
Joshua Sears	United States	The ship was driven ashore and wrecked on Ragged Island. She was on a voyage from Philadelphia, Pennsylvania to Halifax, Nova Scotia, British North America.
Marianne	Bremen	The ship was driven ashore at North Point, Maryland, United States. She was on a voyage from Baltimore, Maryland to Bremen. Marianne was refloated on 3 August and towed into Baltimore.
Nancy	United Kingdom	The ship was driven ashore and wrecked on Long Island, Nova Scotia. Her crew were rescued. She was on a voyage from New York to Grangemouth, Stirlingshire.

== 31 July ==
List of shipwrecks: 31 July 1842
Ship	State	Description
Mavis	United Kingdom	The brig was struck by lightning off "Grand Ladrone" and exploded. Her crew were rescued.
Ulysses	United Kingdom	The ship foundered in the Mediterranean Sea off Corsica, France. Her crew were rescued.

== Unknown date ==
List of shipwrecks: Unknown date in July 1842
Ship	State	Description
Alasco	United States	The barque ran aground on the Florida Reef. She was refloated and taken into New York, where she was condemned.
Atlantic	United States	The ship was lost at the mouth of the Bear River. She was on a voyage from Digby, Nova Scotia, British North America to Boston, Massachusetts.
Francsis I	United Kingdom	The ship was wrecked in the Bay of Port-a-Port, Newfoundland, British North America.
Franklin	United Kingdom	The ship ran aground on the Balance Rocks, off Nassau, Bahamas. She was on a voyage from Liverpool, Lancashire to New Orleans, Louisiana, United States.
Lartilleur	France	The brig was in collision with a barque and foundered in the English Channel with the loss of all hands. She was on a voyage from Stockholm, Sweden to Dieppe, Seine-Inférieure.
Norden	United Kingdom	The barque sank in the Truro River. She was refloated and beached on 27 July.
Oriental	United Kingdom	The ship was damaged by fire whilst on a voyage from Buenos Aires, Argentina to Liverpool, where she arrived on 29 July.
Star	United Kingdom	The ship foundered in the Atlantic Ocean before 4 July. Her crew were rescued by the brig Britannia (United Kingdom). Star was on a voyage from Newcastle upon Tyne, Northumberland to Quebec City, Province of Canada, British North America.
Stephen Rowan	United Kingdom	The ship departed from Calcutta, India. No further trace, presumed foundered with the loss of all hands.
Tees	United Kingdom	The ship ran aground in the Agger Canal. She was on a voyage from Hartlepool, County Durham to Pillau, Prussia. She was refloated on 16 July and taken into Thisted, Denmark in a severely leaky condition.
Venus	United Kingdom	The ship foundered in the Atlantic Ocean off the Rotten Island Lighthouse, County Donegal. She was refloated on 26 July and beached.
