= Bridgetown railway station (County Donegal) =

Railway station in Ireland

Bridgetown

General information
- Location: Laghey, County Donegal; Ireland
- Coordinates: 54.6°N 8.12°W

History
- Original company: West Donegal Railway
- Post-grouping: County Donegal Railways Joint Committee

Key dates
- 21 September 1905: Station opens
- 1 January 1960: Station closes
Location
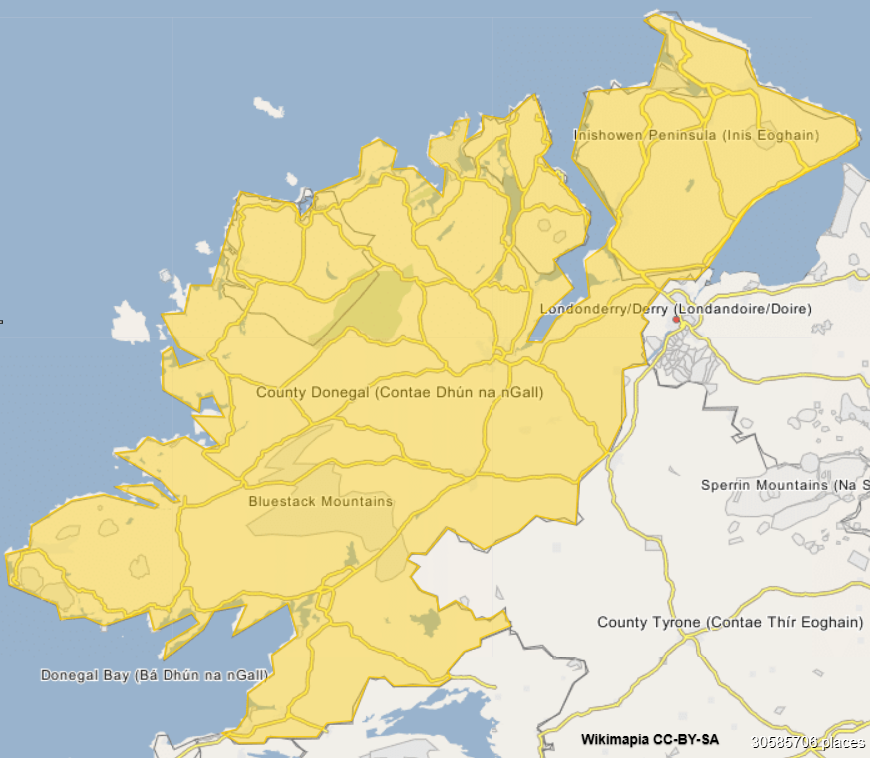
- Location within County Donegal Location within Ireland

Bridgetown railway station served Laghey in County Donegal, Ireland.

The station opened on 21 September 1905 on the Donegal Railway Company line from Donegal to Ballyshannon.

It closed on 1 January 1960.

== Routes ==
Preceding station	Disused railways	Following station
Laghey	Donegal Railway Company; Donegal to Ballyshannon	Ballintra
