= Creevy Halt railway station =

Railway station in Ireland

Creevy Halt
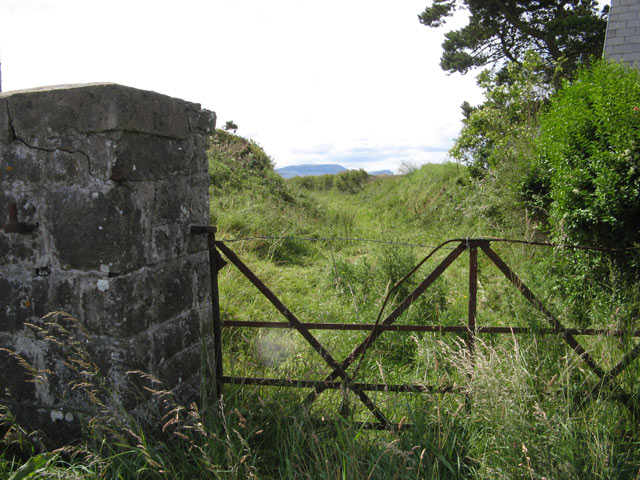
- The old railway formation as seen from the erstwhile gated crossing on the road to Creevy Pier.

General information
- Location: Creevy, County Donegal; Ireland

History
- Original company: West Donegal Railway
- Post-grouping: County Donegal Railways Joint Committee

Key dates
- 1 August 1911: Station opens
- 1 January 1960: Station closes

Creevy railway station served Creevy in County Donegal, Ireland.

== History ==
The station opened on 1 August 1911 on the Donegal Railway Company line from Donegal to Ballyshannon.

It closed on 1 January 1960.

== Routes ==
| Preceding station | Disused railways | Following station |
|---|---|---|
| Coolmore Halt | Donegal Railway Company; Donegal to Ballyshannon | Ballyshannon |
