= Friary Halt railway station =

Railway station in Ireland

Friary Halt

General information
- Location: Rossnowlagh, County Donegal; Ireland

History
- Original company: West Donegal Railway
- Post-grouping: County Donegal Railways Joint Committee

Key dates
- 1 March 1953: Station opens
- 1 January 1960: Station closes

Friary Halt railway station served an area south of Rossnowlagh in County Donegal, Ireland.

The station opened on 1 March 1953 on the Donegal Railway Company line from Donegal to Ballyshannon.

It closed on 1 January 1960.

== Routes ==
Preceding station	Disused railways	Following station
Rossnowlagh	Donegal Railway Company; Donegal to Ballyshannon	Coolmore Halt
