= Tirhugh =

Barony in County Donegal, Ireland

Tirhugh Tír Aodha (Irish)
- Barony
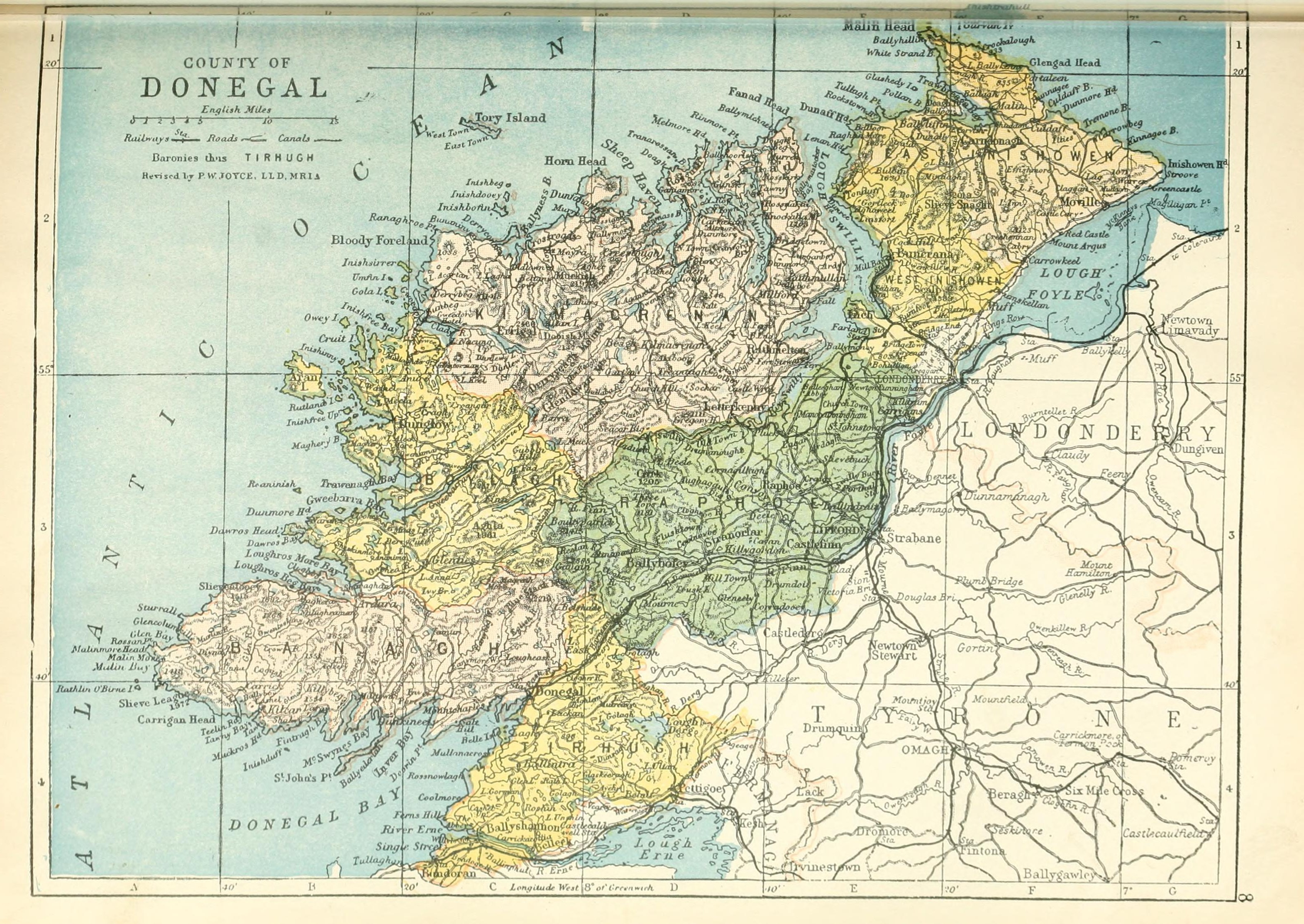
- Barony map of County Donegal, 1900; Tirhugh is in the south, coloured yellow.

- Location within Ireland
- Coordinates: 54°36′N 8°0′W
- Sovereign state: Ireland
- Province: Ulster
- County: Donegal

Area
  - Total: 509.21 km^{2} (196.61 sq mi)

Tirhugh (/tɪrˈhjuː/; Irish: Tír Aodha) is a barony in County Donegal, Ireland. Baronies were mainly cadastral rather than administrative units. They acquired modest local taxation and spending functions in the 19th century before being superseded by the Local Government (Ireland) Act 1898.

== Etymology ==
Tirhugh takes its name from the Irish Tír Aodha, meaning "Aodh's land", referring to Áed mac Ainmuirech, a semi-legendary 6th century king. The Irish name Áed (Aodh) is conventionally translated as Hugh, although the names are etymologically unrelated.

== Geography ==
Tirhugh is located in the south of County Donegal, on the River Erne and the east coast of Donegal Bay. It is the strip of land that connects Donegal to the rest of the Republic of Ireland.

== History ==
The territory of the O'Gallchobair (Gallagher) was centered here from the Middle Ages onward. The Mac Raith, O'Haedha (O'Hugh or Hayes), MacDonlevy, MacNulty, O'Clery, MacWard, O'Lynch and O'Mullhollan were other local septs.

The Annals of the Four Masters mention Tirhugh several times:

1398. A great army was led by Niall Oge O'Neill, King of Kinel-Owen and the sons of Henry O'Neill, against O'Donnell, and arrived at Assaroe; and they plundered the monastery of all its riches, and all Tirhugh. A party of O'Donnell's people gave them battle; and Hugh, son of Farrell O'Rourke, was taken prisoner on this occasion. O'Neill returned in safety to Tyrone. [...] Murtough O'Conor of Sligo went to Tirhugh, and returned to Assaroe, without gaining much booty by the incursion. Hugh O'Duirnin came up with him there, and routed him and his people at Ballyshannon; Hugh's horse was wounded, and he himself thrown off, and afterwards killed.

1412. An army was led by Brian O'Conor into Tirhugh; and he burned the country as far as Murvagh, and slew Coilin Mac Coilin at Ballyshannon.

1419. A great army was led by Brian O'Conor and all the people of Lower Connaught, with many of the English, at the request and solicitation of O'Neill; and they spoiled all Tirhugh, from Ath na-n-Gall to Ballyshannon, including its grass, corn, and buildings; and burned Murvagh, O'Donnell's fortress, while O'Donnell was with his forces in Tyrone. Brian, the son of Donnell, son of Murtough, and his forces, then returned to their homes.

1434. A war arose between O'Donnell (i.e. Niall) and his brother Naghtan, in consequence of the death of Egneaghan O'Donnell. Many depredations were committed, and many lives were lost in the contests between them; and Naghtan went over to the sons of Donnell, the son of Murtough O'Conor of Sligo. O'Donnell took a prey in the Moy (Maghene), and in the territory of Carbury, from the sons of Donnell, son of Murtough, and from Naghtan; and Naghtan and Brian, son of Donnell, with the other sons of Donnell, in revenge of the taking of this prey, made an incursion into the Moy, and into Tirhugh, where they burned houses, and seized inanimate spoils, and numbers of small cattle. Naghtan went a second time into Tirconnell, and committed depredations on Conor, the son of O'Donnell; and Conor in return made an incursion into Carbury, and plundered the whole territory.

1435. The son of Brian Oge, son of Henry O'Neill, made a predatory incursion into Tirhugh; but some of the household of O'Donnell (Niall) overtook him, despoiled him of the prey, took himself prisoner, and slew a great number of his people.

1436. The Crannog of Loch-Laoghaire was taken by the sons of Brian O'Neill. O'Neill and Henry came to the Lough, and sent messengers to Maguire, Thomas Oge, on whose arrival they set about constructing vessels, to land on the Crannog, in which the sons of Brian Oge then were; but these on perceiving their intentions came to the resolution of giving up the Crannog to O'Neill, and made peace with him. O'Neill and Maguire then made an incursion into Tirhugh, where they committed many depredations, obtained great spoils, and killed many persons; after which they returned home.

1474. Great depredations were committed by O'Donnell upon the people of O'Neill, i.e. of Hugh Ballagh, the son of Donnell. A great war broke out between O'Neill and O'Donnell; and the sons of Hugh Boy O'Neill and the O'Neill marched with an army into Tirconnell, and burned Tirhugh, and then returned home again unharmed.

1477. Feuds and dissensions arose between O'Donnell and the sons of Naghtan O'Donnell; and on this occasion Niall, the son of Donnell O'Donnell, and Felim, the son of Turlough O'Donnell, were slain by the sons of Naghtan; and much injury was done between them. O'Neill went upon an expedition into Tirhugh, at the instance of the sons of Naghtan, and ravaged and burned Tirhugh, and returned to his house in victory and triumph.

1495. Con, son of Hugh Roe O'Donnell, with his great little army (Con's army being so called because he was never in the habit of assembling a numerous army, or more than twelve score axe men, for making a standing fight, and sixty horsemen, for following up the rout, and taking prisoners ), marched to Mac Eoin of the Glins, for it had been told to him Con that Mac Eoin had the finest wife, steed (Dubhacoite by name), and hound, in his neighbourhood. Con had before that time sent messengers for the steed, but was refused it, though it had been promised by Con to one of his people. Con made no delay, but surmounted the difficulties of every passage, until he arrived at night with his "great little" band at the house of Mac Eoin, without having given him any previous notice or intelligence of his designs, and immediately took Mac Eoin prisoner, and made himself master of his wife, his steed, and his hound, together with all his other wealth, for he found the famous steed, and sixteen others with it, in the house on that occasion. The Glins were all plundered on the following day by Con's people; but he afterwards made full restitution to Mac Eoin's wife of all such property as was hers; and as soon as he had crossed the Bann, on his return westwards, he set her husband at liberty for her, but he carried the steed, with vast preys and spoils, with him into Tirhugh, and ordered the cattle-spoils to be left upon its grassy fields.

1522. A great war arose between O'Donnell and O'Neill. Mac William of Clanrickard, the English and Irish of Connaught, the O'Briens, the O'Kennedys, and the O'Carrolls, joined and leagued with O'Neill against O'Donnell in that war. The following are the chiefs who came from the west with their combined forces on this expedition: Mac William of Clanrickard (Ulick, the son of Ulick of the Wine); and a party of the chiefs of the O'Briens namely, Donough and Teige, the sons of Turlough, son of Teige O'Brien; and the young Bishop O'Brien; O'Carroll (Mulrony, the son of John), and the O'Kennedys; and not they alone, but such of the Connacians as had been until that time under his tribute, and had been obedient to him O'Donnell, namely, O'Conor Roe, O'Conor Don, Mac William Burke, Mac Dermot of Moylurg, and all that were amongst them in Connaught. All these forces were in readiness to march against O'Donnell, and it was on Lady-day in Harvest they appointed to join O'Neill in Tirhugh. […] When O'Donnell heard that O'Neill had done these deeds, he ordered his son, Manus O'Donnell, to proceed into Tyrone with a detachment of his army, and to plunder and burn that country; and he himself, with the number of forces he had kept with him, directed his course over Bearnas, in pursuit of O'Neill, and to defend Tirhugh. As to Manus, he plundered and burned all the neighbouring parts of Kinel-Owen; he also slew and destroyed many persons, and then returned in triumph.

The name "Tirhugh" is used today for the Tirhugh Resource Centre, Ballyshannon, for the local unemployed.

== List of settlements ==
Below is a list of settlements in Tirhugh:

- Ballintra
- Ballyshannon
- Bundoran
- Donegal
- Laghy
- Pettigo
