= Durnesh Lough =

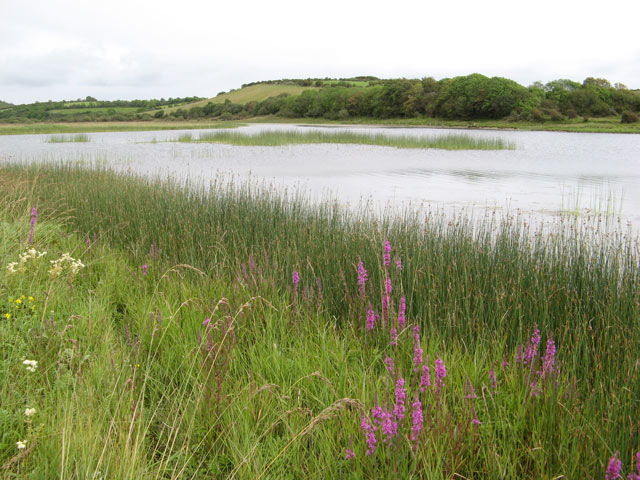
- View of the northern part of Durnesh Lough

- Location in Ireland
- Location: County Donegal
- Coordinates: 54°34′15″N 8°11′4″W
- Lake type: lagoon
- Catchment area: 15.10 km^{2} (5.8 sq mi)
- Basin countries: Ireland
- Max. length: 1.6 km (1 mi)
- Max. width: 1.0 km (0.6 mi)
- Surface area: 0.70 km^{2} (0.27 sq mi)
- Average depth: 1 m (3 ft 3 in)
- Max. depth: 1.5 m (4 ft 11 in)
- Surface elevation: 0 m (0 ft)

Durnesh Lough is a sedimentary lagoon in the northwest of Ireland. It is located on the coast of south County Donegal.

== Geography ==
Durnesh Lough is located about 12 kilometres (7 mi) north of Ballyshannon on the R231 road, just past the village of Rossnowlagh. It measures about 1.5 km (0.9 mi) long north–south and 1.0 km (0.6 mi) wide.

== Hydrology ==
Durnesh Lough is separated from the sea by drumlins and high sand dunes. At one time there was a natural outflow, but that has been replaced by an artificial channel flowing to the sea, which admits some seawater. A small number of streams enter the lagoon, which has a salinity of up to 7 ppt.

== Natural history ==
The lagoon forms the main part of the Durnesh Lough Special Area of Conservation, other parts being the dunes, the beach, a cobble storm-beach, drumlins covered with sand and a small seawater lagoon.

The margins of the lough have extensive reedbeds with common reed, bulrush and common clubrush. In the parts of the lough with a muddy substrate, the emergent vegetation includes yellow iris, mare's tail and reed canary-grass. In the stony areas there are shoreweed and common club-rush. Submerged vegetation includes tasselweed, beaked tasselweed, and the uncommon freshwater green alga Chara canescens. There are also some uncommon invertebrates among the 48 taxa recorded in the lough.

Fish species in Durnesh Lough include sand goby, flounder, rudd, three-spined stickleback, sea trout and the critically endangered European eel. Otters are also present.

Durnesh Lough is also part of the Durnesh Lough Important Bird Area. Significant species wintering here include mute swan, whooper swan, tundra swan, greater white-fronted goose and several species of duck which feed in the wet grassland adjacent to the lough.

== See also ==
- List of loughs in Ireland
