= Aghaderg =

Civil parish in County Down, Northern Ireland

Aghaderg is a civil parish in County Down, Northern Ireland. It is situated in mainly in the historic barony of Iveagh Upper, Upper Half, with some areas in the baronies of Iveagh Lower, Lower Half (2 townlands) and Iveagh Upper, Lower Half (1 townland).

== Settlements ==
The civil parish contains the following settlements:

- Loughbrickland
- Poyntzpass
- Scarva

== Townlands ==
Aghaderg civil parish contains the following townlands:

- Ballintaggart
- Ballygowan
- Ballynaskeagh
- Ballyvarley
- Bovennett
- Brickland
- Carrickdrumman
- Caskum
- Coolnacran
- Creevy
- Derrydrummock
- Dromorebrague
- Drummiller
- Drumnahare
- Drumsallagh
- Edenderry
- Glaskerbeg East
- Glaskerbeg West
- Glaskermore
- Glenloughan
- Greenan
- Legananny
- Lisnabrague
- Lisnagade
- Lisnagonnell
- Lisnatierny
- Loughadian
- Meenan
- Scarva
- Shankill

== See also ==
- List of civil parishes of County Down
