= Rotten Island Lighthouse =

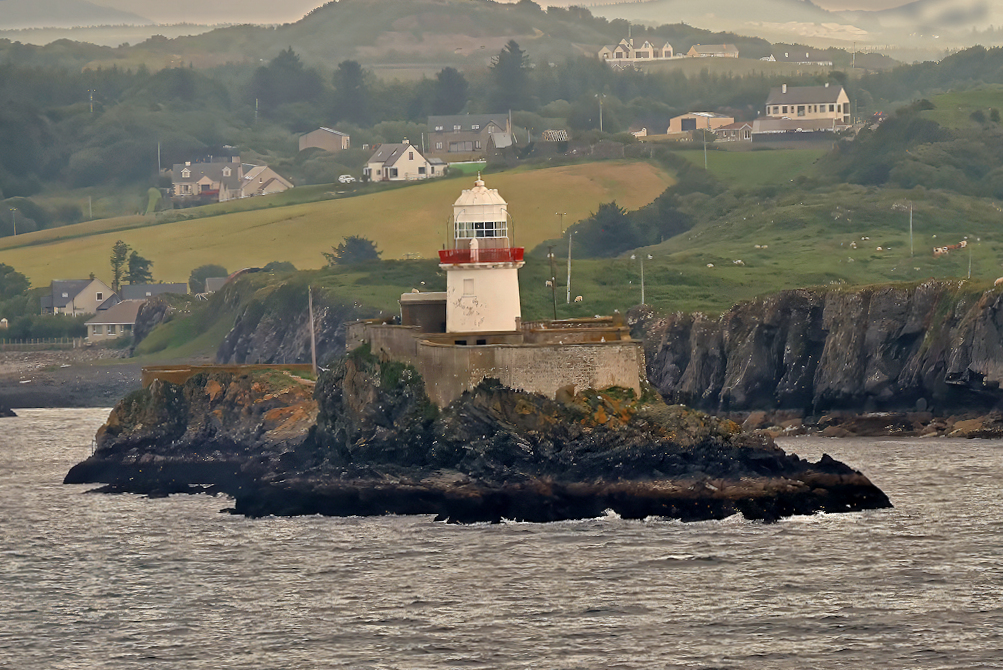
- Location: Killybegs Harbour, Donegal Bay, Ireland
- Coordinates: 54°36′52.4″N 8°26′26.1″W

Tower
- Constructed: 1838
- Construction: granite blocks tower
- Automated: 7 January 1959
- Height: 15 metres (49 ft)
- Shape: tapered cylindrical tower
- Markings: white tower, red gallery
- Operator: Commissioners of Irish Lights

Light
- First lit: 1838
- Focal height: 20 metres (66 ft)
- Lens: 3rd order catoptric (original), 4th order cylindric refractor (current)
- Intensity: White: 13,000 cd Red: 2,600 cd
- Range: White: 15 nautical miles (28 km; 17 mi); Red 11 nautical miles (20 km; 13 mi)
- Characteristic: Fl WR 4s
- Ireland no.: CIL-1710

Rotten Island Lighthouse (Irish: Teach Solais An tOileán Bréan) is a harbour light to light the passage from St. John's Point to inner channel and past the rocks to the anchorage within Killybegs Harbour, Donegal Bay, Ireland. It is operated by the Commissioners of Irish Lights.

== History ==
The Inspecting Commander of the Coastguard wrote to the Ballast Board on 21 April 1832 recommending that a light be placed on Drumanoo Point. George Halpin, Inspector to the Ballast Board, agreed that a light was necessary but he recommended Rotten Island instead. The Ballast Board then approved a light in 1833 and Statutory Sanction was obtained from Trinity House.

=== Design and construction ===
The lighthouse and keepers' houses were designed by George Halpin and the works were carried out by the Board's workers under his inspection. The conical tower of cut granite was painted white. The original light was a fixed white catoptric third order lens pointed to land 66 feet above high water and visible in clear weather for 12 miles. It was first exhibited on 1 September 1838 before completion. The cost at the end of 1839 amounted to £8,697.19s.4d.

On 15 September 1836 three men drowned while returning from work on the rock as their boat capsized.

=== Changes ===
In 1910 the fixed light was changed to a fifth order dioptric lens, flashing with a character of one flash every three seconds. This new light was introduced on 13 December 1910.

The station was automated on 7 January 1959 and the dioptric lens with its revolving machine and vaporised paraffin incandescent burner were replaced by a new fourth order cylindric refractor lens. Its mantle light source used dissolved acetylene from a battery of cylinders giving a candlepower of 2,600 white light and 500 in the red sector. This appeared to be worse than the old light and mariners using the harbour complained about the new lens.

The light was converted to electric on 1 February 1963 which increased the candlepower to 13,000 white and 2,600 in the red sector of the light. The character though remained the same, one flash every three seconds. If the electricity supply fails, an automatic changeover to batteries comes into operation and an acetylene standby can be fitted if the battery standby fails.

The character was changed to one flash every four seconds on 1 February 1965.

== See also ==
- List of lighthouses in Ireland
