= Rotten Island =

Island in County Donegal, Ireland

Native name: An tOileán Bréan
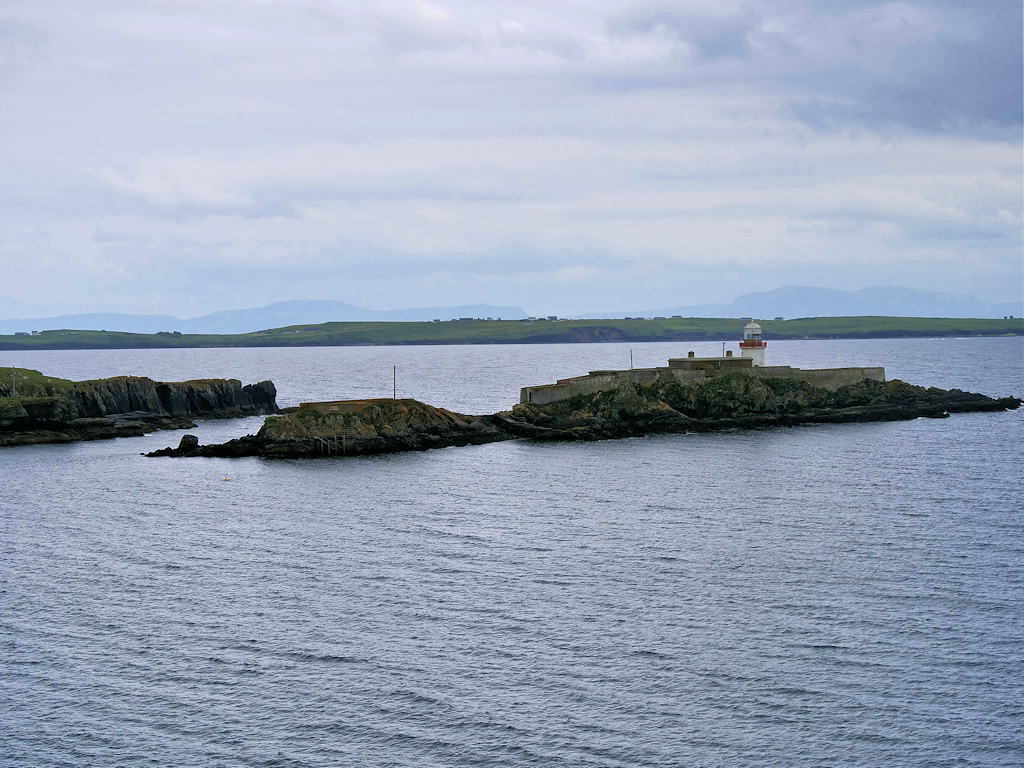

- Location within island of Ireland

Geography
- Location: Atlantic Ocean
- Coordinates: 54.614643°N 8.440430°W

Administration
- Ireland
- Province: Ulster
- County: Donegal

Demographics
- Population: 0

Rotten Island (Irish: An tOileán Bréan) is a small island close to the entrance of Killybegs Harbour, an inlet of Donegal Bay, in County Donegal, Ireland.

== Features ==
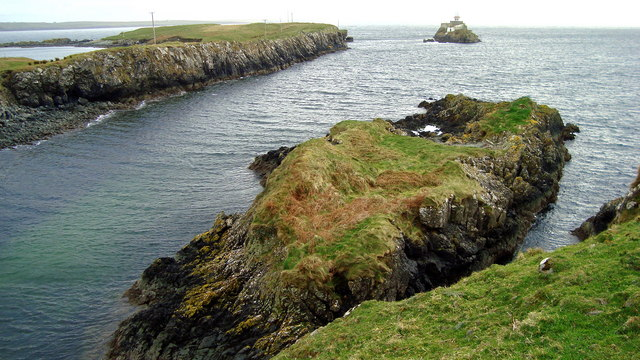
Carntullagh Head and Rotten Island

Rotten Island lighthouse was established in 1838 and is still operational. It has a white conical masonry tower with a red gallery and is operated by the Commissioners of Irish Lights.

== Demographics ==
Historical population

Year	Pop.	±%
1841	11	—
1851	8	−27.3%
1861	6	−25.0%
1871	0	−100.0%
1881	0	0.00%
1891	0	0.00%
1901	0	0.00%
1911	4	—

Year	Pop.	±%
1926	8	+100.0%
1936	3	−62.5%
1946	0	−100.0%
1951	3	—
1956	2	−33.3%
1961	0	−100.0%
1966	0	0.00%
1971	0	0.00%

Year	Pop.	±%
1979	0	0.00%
1981	0	0.00%
1986	0	0.00%
1991	0	0.00%
1996	0	0.00%
2002	0	0.00%
2006	0	0.00%

Source: Central Statistics Office. "CNA17: Population by Off Shore Island, Sex and Year". CSO.ie.

== Other projects ==
Media related to Rotten Island at Wikimedia Commons
