= Coolmore Halt railway station =

Railway station in County Donegal, Ireland

Coolmore Halt

General information
- Location: Cool More, County Donegal; Ireland

History
- Original company: West Donegal Railway
- Post-grouping: County Donegal Railways Joint Committee

Key dates
- 1 February 1930: Station opens
- 1 January 1960: Station closes

Coolmore railway station served Cool More in County Donegal, Ireland.

The station opened on 1 February 1930 on the Donegal Railway Company line from Donegal to Ballyshannon.

It closed on 1 January 1960.

== Routes ==
Preceding station	Disused railways	Following station
Friary Halt	Donegal Railway Company; Donegal to Ballyshannon	Creevy Halt
