= Ballintra railway station =

Former railway station in Ireland

Ballintra
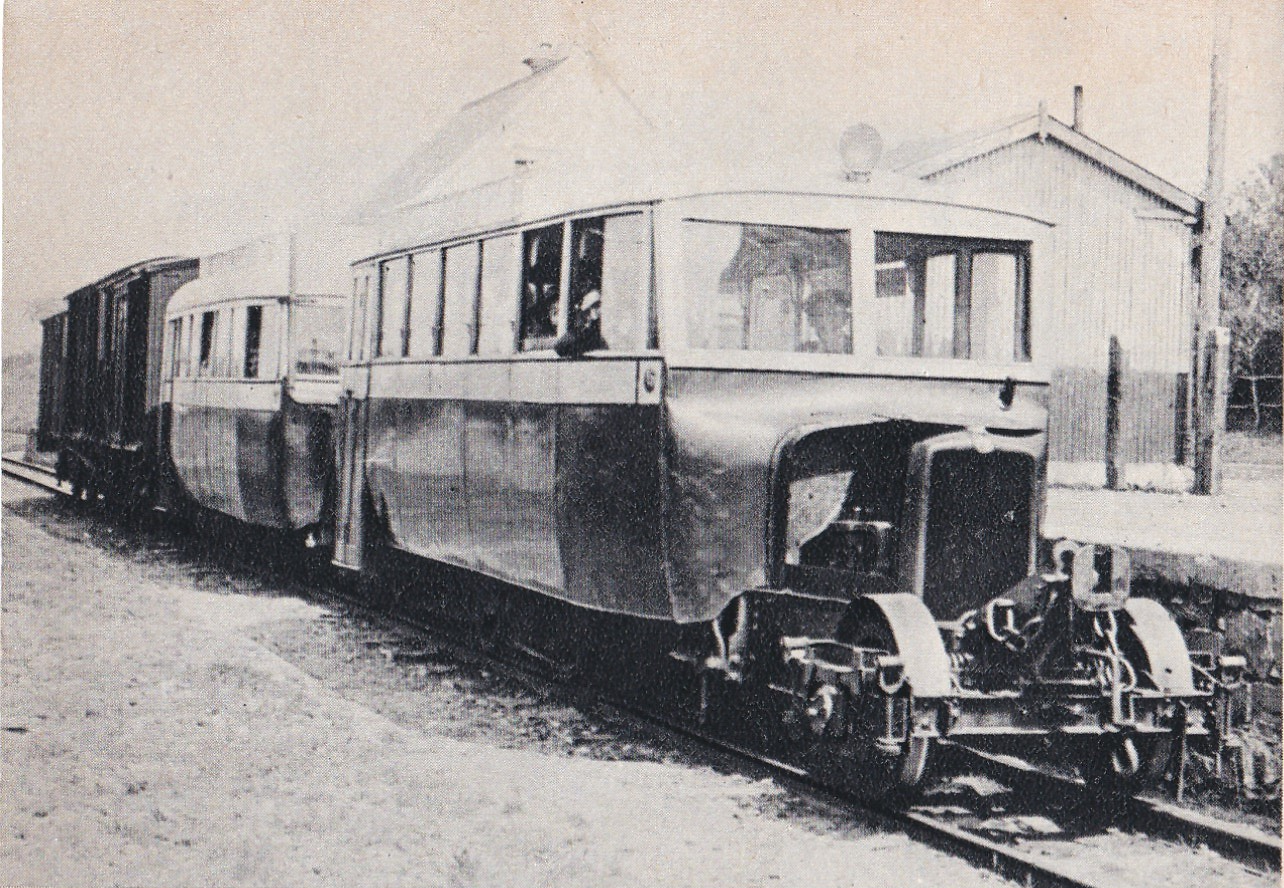
- Railcars at Ballintra in the 1930s

General information
- Location: Ballintra, County Donegal; Ireland
- Coordinates: 54.5812°N 8.1426°W

History
- Opened: 21 September 1905
- Closed: 1 January 1960
- Original company: Donegal Railway Company
- Post-grouping: County Donegal Railways Joint Committee

Services
Preceding station	Donegal Railway Company	Following station
Bridgetown	Donegal to Ballyshannon	Dromore Halt
Location

Ballintra railway station was a Donegal Railway Company station on the Donegal to Ballyshannon line. It was approximately 1 mile (1.6 km) from the village of Ballintra, County Donegal in Ireland.

== History ==
Opened in September 1905, Ballintra was a station on the narrow-gauge railway line from Donegal Town to Ballyshannon. Located a short distance from the village, a local carriage service carried passengers to Ballintra. The station had two sidings, a goods shed and cattle pens.

Originally operated by the Donegal Railway Company, the line and station transferred to the County Donegal Railways Joint Committee in 1906.

As with other stations on the line, Ballintra station closed on 1 January 1960.

== See also ==
- List of narrow-gauge railways in Ireland
