= Townawilly =

Parish in County Donegal, Ireland

Townawilly is a parish in the Barony of Tirhugh within the Roman Catholic Diocese of Raphoe in County Donegal, Ireland. The parish includes most of Donegal Town, with the parish running along the shores of Lough Eske, just to the north-east of the town. The mountainous area known locally as ‘Townawilly’, ranging approximately from the south-eastern portion of Lough Eske to farther north in the Bluestack Mountains ('the Croaghs'), gives its name to the larger parish. The spelling of this placename can also be found as 'Tawnawully', after the Irish Tamhnach 'a Mhullaigh. This translates approximately as 'highland meadow' or 'arable hilltop'.

== History ==
=== Townawilly Tenantry School ===
The Commissioners of Education in their 1848 report mention that they had built a 'substantial' school in Townawilly.

In 1858 the Commissioners reported that pupils attending the school got little educational benefit as the master could not speak Irish, while the junior classes could not speak English. The total number on the roll was 87. All were free students and only three were non-Catholic.

=== Archaeology ===
The area is abundant with evidence of wells, standing stones, ringforts, and other monuments of ancient construction and import.

English 'Crown' coins dating to the early 17th century were discovered in the townland of Garvagh in the 1940s.

== Townlands ==
Townlands within the area of Townawilly include: Milltown, Ardeevin, Mullanalamphry, Ardnableask, Ardatowel, Townagorm, Garvagh, Corracramph, Goladoo.
