= Leonard Boyle =

Canadian priest and scholar

Leonard Eugene Boyle OP OC
- Born: 13 November 1923; Ballintra, County Donegal, Irish Free State
- Died: 25 October 1999 (aged 75); Rome, Italy
- Occupations: scholar in medieval studies and palaeography

Leonard Eugene Boyle (13 November 1923 - 25 October 1999) was an Irish and Canadian scholar in medieval studies and palaeography.

He was the first Irish and North American Prefect of the Vatican Library in Rome from 1984 to 1997.

== Early life ==
Boyle was born in County Donegal, Irish Free State. He entered the Dominican Order in 1943 and was ordained a priest in 1949. He received his doctorate at Oxford University.

== Career ==
Boyle served as Professor of Latin Paleography and History of Medieval Theology at the Pontifical University of St. Thomas Aquinas in Rome from 1956 to 1961.

He taught at the Pontifical Institute of Mediaeval Studies and the Centre for Medieval Studies at the University of Toronto from 1961 to 1984.

In 1984, he was appointed Prefect of the Vatican Library by Pope John Paul II. Boyle set about the digitization of the library's many manuscripts. Boyle employed women for the first time as part of the library's staff. In 1987, he was made an Officer of the Order of Canada.

In 1997, he was involved in a lawsuit regarding the legality of reproductions of Vatican manuscripts. Boyle was exonerated, but the case took its toll on his health.

Boyle was living with emphysema and cancer and died on October 19, 1999. He is buried at the San Clemente al Laterano.
