= Ballyshannon railway station (County Donegal Railways) =

Former railway station in Ireland

Coordinates: 54.5062°N 8.1888°W

Ballyshannon (CDJ)

General information
- Location: Ballyshannon, County Donegal; Ireland

History
- Opened: 21 September 1905
- Closed: 1 January 1960
- Original company: West Donegal Railway
- Post-grouping: County Donegal Railways Joint Committee

Services
Preceding station	Donegal Railway Company	Following station
Creevy Halt	Donegal to Ballyshannon	Terminus
Location
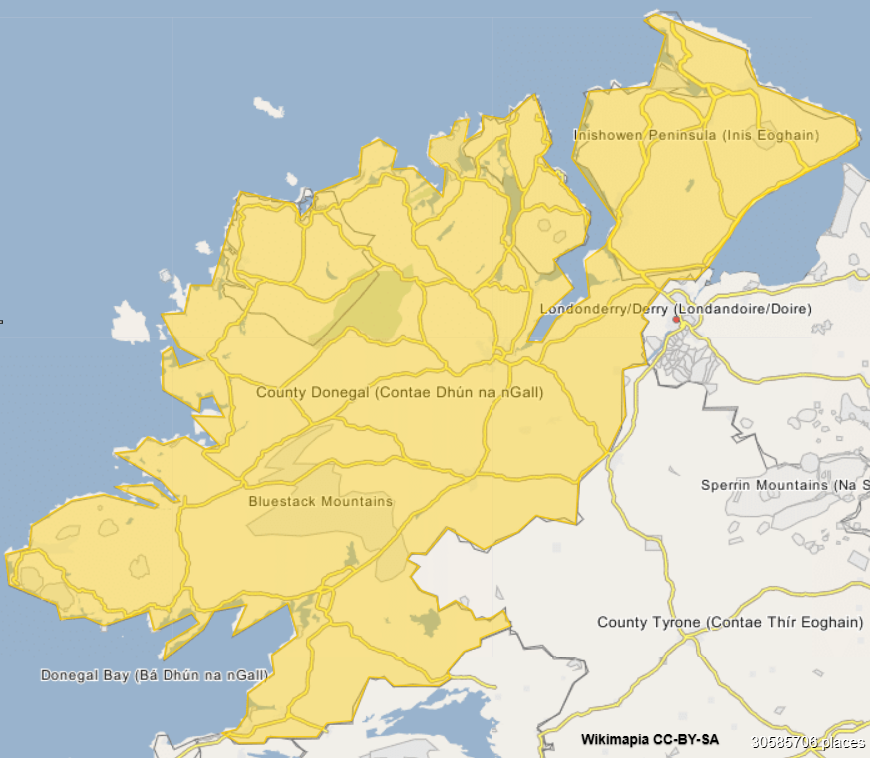
- Location within County Donegal Location within Ireland

Ballyshannon (CDJ) railway station served Ballyshannon in County Donegal, Ireland.

The station opened on 21 September 1905 as the terminus of the Donegal Railway Company line from Donegal to Ballyshannon.

It closed on 1 January 1960.
