= Easkey Britton =

Irish surfer

Personal information
- Born: Easkey Britton Rossnowlagh, County Donegal, Ireland
- Website: easkeybritton.com

Surfing career
- Sport: Surfing
- Best year: Five times Irish National Surfing Championship from 2005 to 2010
- Sponsors: Ambassador for Finisterre
- Major achievements: 2011 WSL Big Wave Awards nominee; Five times Irish Champion; 2009, 2006 British Pro-Tour Champion

Surfing specifications
- Shaper(s): JP surfboards; Luke Hart

Easkey Britton is an Irish surfer from Rossnowlagh, County Donegal. In 2010, she won her fifth consecutive Irish National Surfing Championship title at her namesake wave in County Sligo and in 2009 became the British Pro-Tour Champion.

Britton was the first female surfer to ride the "big wave", Aill na Searrach, off the Cliffs of Moher in 2007. The 15-foot (4.6 m) wave was featured in the Irish documentary film Waveriders.

Britton is the first Irish woman to be nominated for the Billabong XXL Awards (now called the WSL Big Wave Awards) for her performance tow surfing at Ireland's premier big wave spot, Mullaghmore, in February 2011, becoming the first woman to do so.

Britton's younger sister Becky-Finn Britton is also a longboarder. Her cousin, Tahlia Britton, became the first female diver in the Irish Navy in August 2020.

== Selected publications ==
- Blue care: a systematic review of blue space interventions for health and wellbeing, in Health Promotional International
- Sensing Water: Uncovering Health and Well-Being in the Sea and Surf, in Journal of Sport and Social Issues
- Women as agents of wellbeing in Northern Ireland's fishing households, in Maritime Studies
