= Dromore Halt railway station =

Railway station in Ireland

Dromore Halt

General information
- Location: Dromore, County Donegal; Ireland

History
- Original company: West Donegal Railway
- Post-grouping: County Donegal Railways Joint Committee

Key dates
- 1 February 1930: Station opens
- 1 January 1960: Station closes

Dromore Halt railway station served Dromore in County Donegal, Ireland.

The station opened on 1 February 1930 on the Donegal Railway Company line from Donegal to Ballyshannon.

It closed on 1 January 1960.

== Routes ==
Preceding station	Disused railways	Following station
Ballintra	Donegal Railway Company; Donegal to Ballyshannon	Rossnowlagh
