= Laghey railway station =

Former railway station in County Donegal, Ireland

Laghey

General information
- Location: Laghey, County Donegal; Ireland

History
- Original company: West Donegal Railway
- Post-grouping: County Donegal Railways Joint Committee

Key dates
- 1 September 1905: Station opens
- 1 January 1960: Station closes
Location

Laghey railway station served Laghey in County Donegal, Ireland.

The station opened on 1 September 1905 on the Donegal Railway Company line from Donegal to Ballyshannon.

It closed on 1 January 1960.

== Routes ==
Preceding station	Disused railways	Following station
Drumbar Halt	Donegal Railway Company; Donegal to Ballyshannon	Bridgetown
