= Rossnowlagh railway station =

Station in County Donegal, Ireland

Rossnowlagh Rossknowlagh

General information
- Location: Rossnowlagh, County Donegal; Ireland

History
- Original company: West Donegal Railway
- Post-grouping: County Donegal Railways Joint Committee

Key dates
- 21 February 1905: Station opens
- 1 January 1960: Station closes
Location

Rossnowlagh railway station served Rossnowlagh in County Donegal, Ireland.

The station opened on 21 February 1905 on the Donegal Railway Company line from Donegal to Ballyshannon.

It closed on 1 January 1960.

== Routes ==
Preceding station	Disused railways	Following station
Dromore Halt	Donegal Railway Company; Donegal to Ballyshannon	Friary Halt
