= Creevy =

Townland in County Down, Northern Ireland

Creevy (Ir. An Chraobhaigh 'the place of branches or trees') is a townland in the County Down, Northern Ireland. It is in the parish of Aghaderg, which is in the barony of Iveagh, near Loughbrickland, Banbridge.

Creevy has an area of 470.82 acres.

== Sources ==
- Placenamesni.org
