= Laghy =

Village in County Donegal, Ireland

Laghy An Lathaigh
- Village
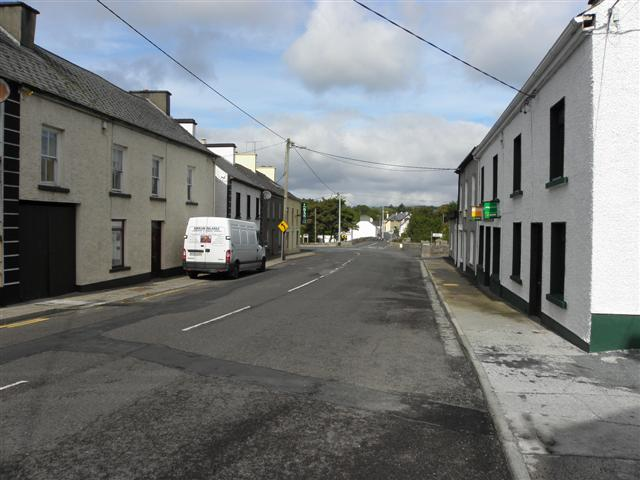
- Main Street

- Location in Ireland
- Coordinates: 54°37′00″N 8°05′15″W
- Country: Ireland
- Province: Ulster
- County: County Donegal

Government
  - Dáil constituency: Donegal

Population (2022)
  - Total: 176
- Area code: +353 74
- Irish Grid Reference: G939748

Laghy or Laghey (LAH-hee; Irish: An Lathaigh) is a village and townland in County Donegal, Ireland, between Ballintra and Donegal Town. It is one of three villages that make up the parish of Drumholm, formerly a civil and Church of Ireland parish, now only used as a division of the Roman Catholic Diocese of Raphoe. The village has a quarry, a supermarket, garden centre, filling station, two public houses, a church with a graveyard, an Orange hall, a recycling centre, a Donegal County Council yard and salt depot, and a national school (St Eunan's NS). Rossnowlagh and Murvagh beaches are nearby. Murvagh is also the home to Donegal Golf Club.

== Landmarks ==
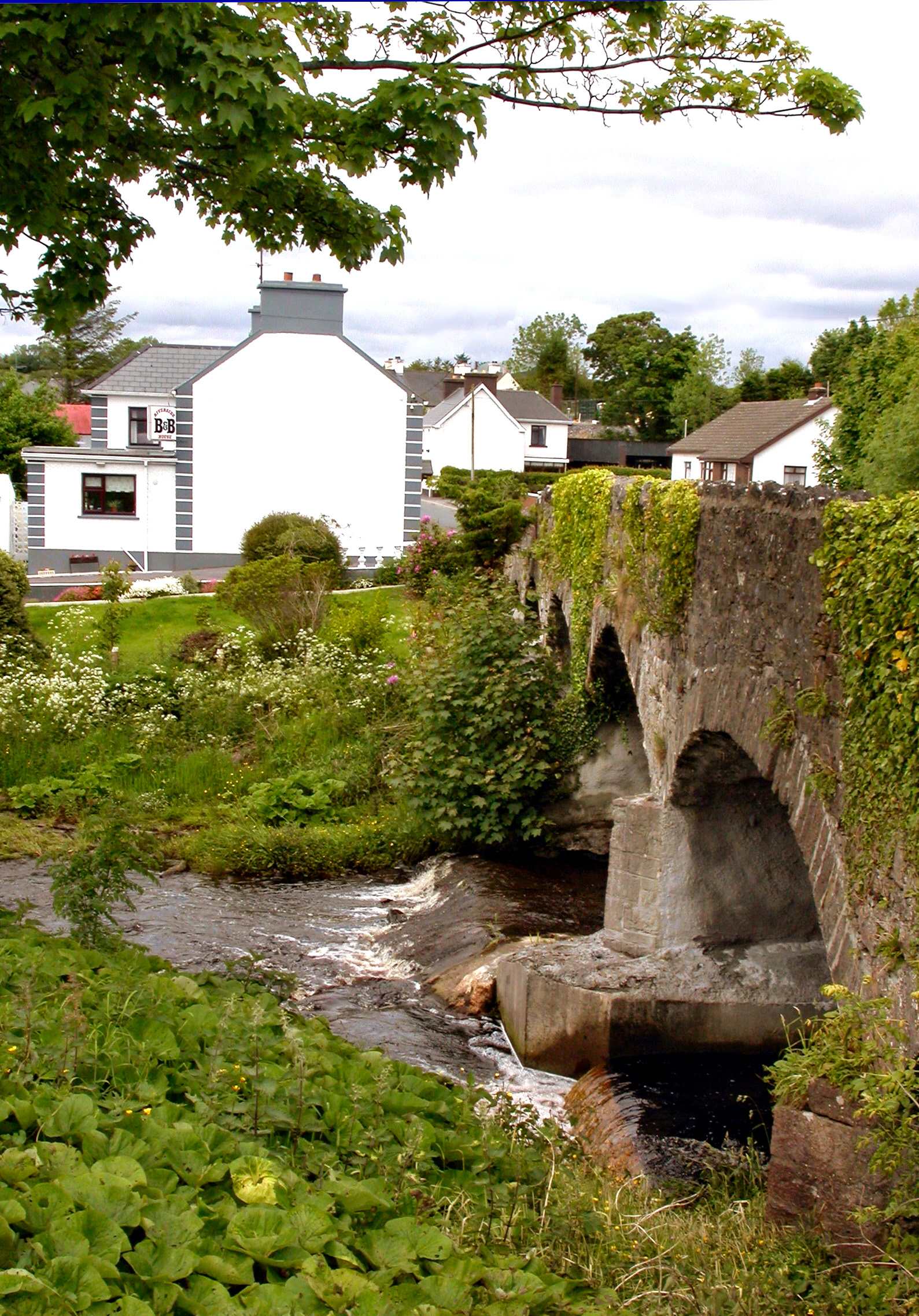
Seven Arches Bridge

Landmarks in the village include the Seven Arches Bridge at the bottom of the main street, and a signpost within the village that says Laghey is 1 km away.

== Transport ==
=== Rail transport ===
Laghey railway station opened on 1 September 1905, was shut for goods traffic on 15 December 1947 and shut altogether on 1 January 1960. The station was part of the County Donegal Railways Joint Committee network.

=== Bus transport ===
Laghey is served by Bus Éireann route 480.

== Education ==
St Eunan's National School (Irish: Scoil Náisiúnta Naomh Adhamhnáin) is the only school remaining in the village. It is a Catholic primary school, one of two in the parish of Drumholm, under the patronage of the Bishop of Raphoe, and is named after Saint Eunan, one of the two patron saints of the diocese. The school was built in the first half of the twentieth century and is in the design of many others built across the country at this time.

The original school had two class rooms, while an extension, which opened in 1992, added a further two to the west end of the existing building. The school is directly adjacent to the main N15 Sligo to Letterkenny road, which also cuts the school off from the main part of the village. Because of this, when the village was being by-passed for the upgrading of the route, a tunnel had to be constructed to allow those living to the east of the road in the main part of the village to access the school safely.

Secondary education is provided by the Abbey Vocational School in Donegal Town, while a small number attend Colaiste Cholmcille in Ballyshannon.

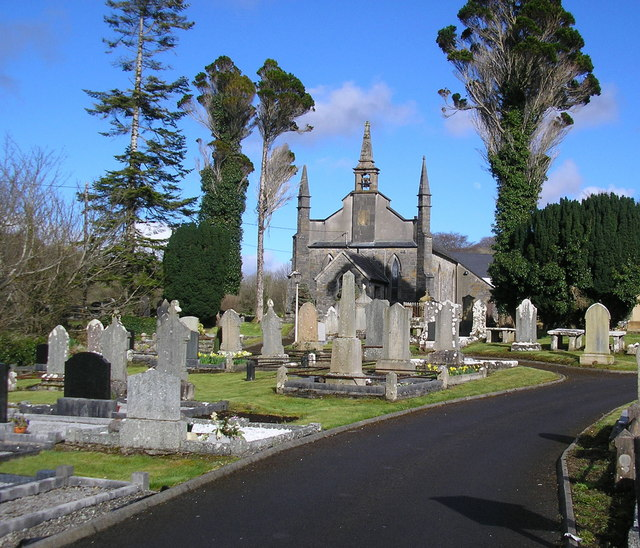
Laghy Church of Ireland

== Sport ==
The local Gaelic Athletic Association club is called Naomh Bríd (the club also includes Ballintra). The local soccer club is called Copany Rovers F.C. (also including Ballintra).

== See also ==
- List of populated places in Ireland
