= Ballintra =

Village in County Donegal, Ireland

Ballintra Baile an tSratha
- Village
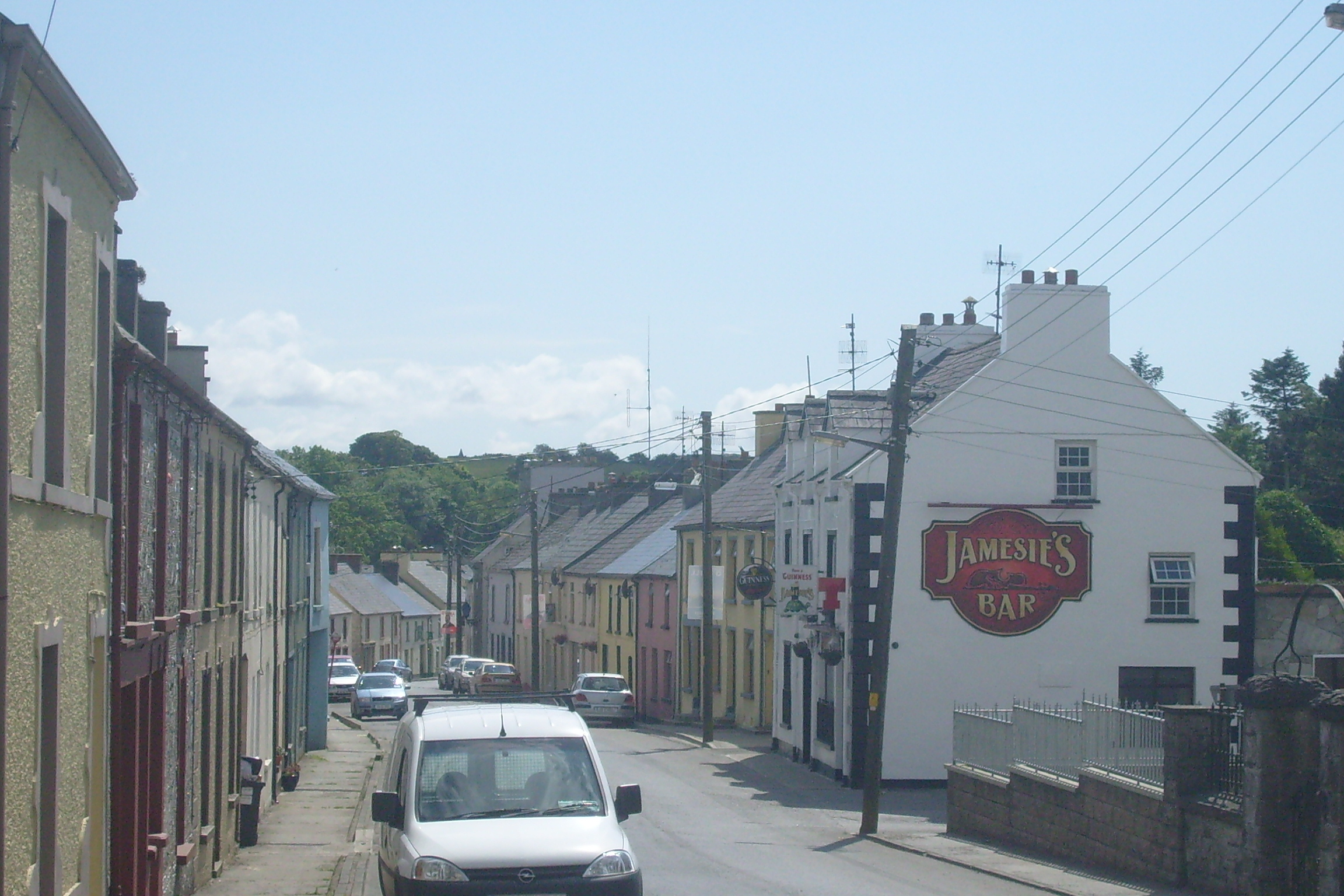
- Ballintra's main street

- Location in Ireland
- Coordinates: 54°34′30″N 8°07′24″W
- Country: Ireland
- Province: Ulster
- County: County Donegal

Population (2022)
  - Total: 242
- Time zone: UTC+0 (WET)
  - Summer (DST): UTC-1 (IST (WEST))
- Irish Grid Reference: G917700

Ballintra (Irish: Baile an tSratha) is a village in the civil parish of Drumhome in the south of County Donegal, Ireland, just off the N15 road between Donegal town and Ballyshannon. Ballintra lies on the northern bank of the Blackwater river (sometimes referred to as the Ballintra River). The river rises in the hills that lie inland from the town, and flows through a number of small lakes before spilling over a small waterfall in a gorge behind the village.

The Irish meaning of Ballintra, Baile an tSratha, means town by the low-lying land along a river. The village is situated close to Rossnowlagh and Murvagh beaches.

The village is situated in a limestone area, and there are a number of quarries in the area.

== History ==
=== Built heritage ===
Evidence of prehistoric settlement in the area include a number of ringforts (for example in nearby Moneymore townland) and a megalithic wedge tomb (in Ballymagrorty townland).

Much of the village itself was laid-out in the late 18th and early 19th century, with the town's bridges dating from the 1780s and 1790s, and Ballintra's Anglican, Catholic and Methodist churches dating to 1795, 1845 and 1896 respectively.

=== Irish language decline ===
The 1911 census records only a handful of people in Ballintra who were Irish speakers. In his paper "Irish Speaking in the Pre-famine Period", Dr. Garret Fitzgerald remarks that "near Ballintra the language seems to have disappeared by the time of the Famine. Around Ballyshannon it also seems to have been almost extinct". As late as 1960, up to a few dozen native Irish speakers remained in Tamhnach a' Mhullaigh (known in English as Townawilly or Tawnawully). The Irish scholar and campaigner Máirtín Ó Cadhain visited the area in 1957 to record folklore stories in Irish from a family in the area.

=== Developments ===
The 2016 census indicates that approximately 35% of homes in Ballintra were built in the early 20th century or prior, with a further peak in building (20% of homes) built in the 1970s. The latter includes a number of social housing units built by Donegal County Council in the 1970s. Other developments include a bypass road built in the early 1980s.

In the 20 years between the 1996 and the 2016 census, the population of the village decreased by 12%, from 217 to 191 residents.

== Amenities ==
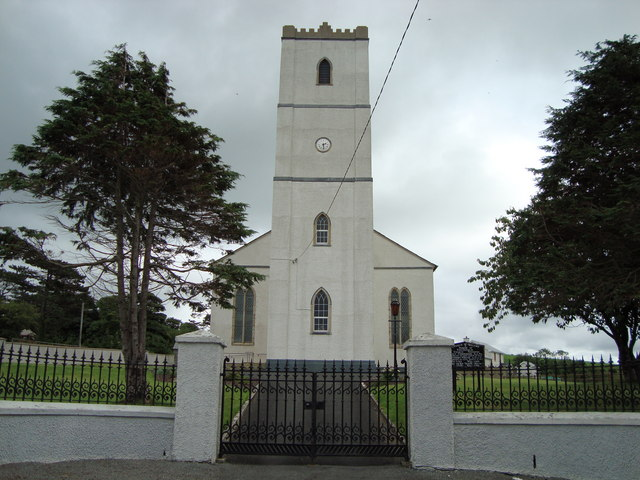
Ballintra Church of Ireland

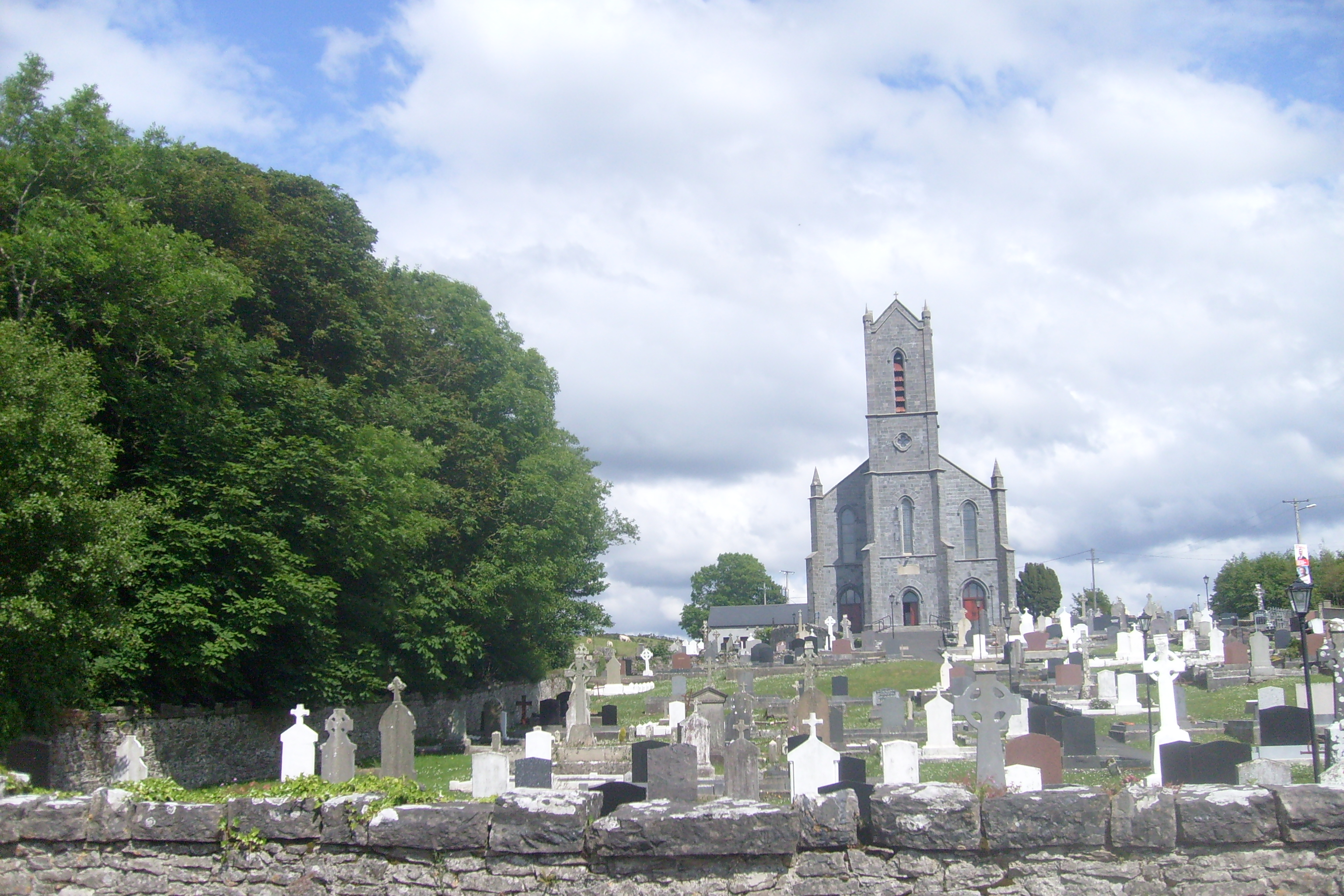
Ballintra Roman Catholic church

Ballintra has one public house, a grocery store, a takeaway, a hairdresser, two primary schools (St. Ernan's NS and The Robertson NS), and three churches (Methodist, Church of Ireland, and Roman Catholic).

== Sport ==
The Ballintra Races is an annual horse race run on a field close to the nearby Murvagh beach. Proceeds from the event go to support amenities in the area.

The local Gaelic Athletic Association club is called Naomh Bríd (a club which also takes players from Laghey). The local association football (soccer) club is called Copany Rovers (and also represents Laghey).

== Transport ==
Ballintra railway station opened on 21 September 1905, but finally closed on 1 January 1960. The station was on the County Donegal Railways Joint Committee network.

By road, Ballintra lies just off the N15 national primary route from Lifford to Sligo.

== People ==
- Saint Assicus is buried in Ballymagroarty, Ballintra. He was St Patrick's blacksmith and was en route from Elphin to County Down when he died
- Leonard Boyle, a Canadian scholar, was born in Ballintra
- Matt Gallagher, Gaelic footballer, All-Ireland winner with Donegal in 1992, played with Laghey-Ballintra club Naomh Bríd
- Thomas Morrow, who became a politician in New South Wales, was born in Ballintra
- David Walsh, inter-county Gaelic footballer, All-Ireland winner with Donegal in 2012, is a native of Ballintra

== See also ==
- List of populated places in Ireland
- List of abbeys and priories in Ireland (County Donegal)
