= Donegal Bay =

Bay in Ireland

Coordinates: 54°32′N 8°30′W

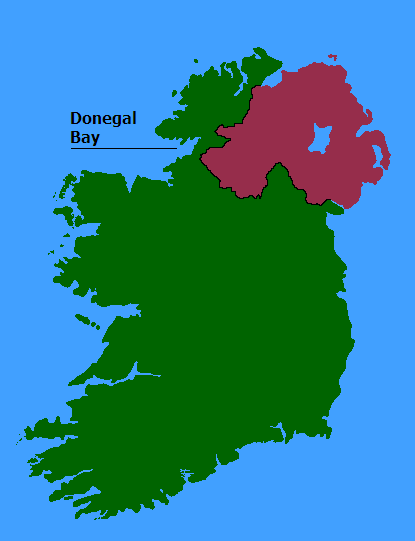
Location of Donegal Bay.

Donegal Bay (Irish: Bá Dhún na nGall) is an inlet (or bay) in the northwest of Ireland. Three counties – Donegal to the north and west, Leitrim and Sligo to the south – have shorelines on the bay, which is bounded on the west by the Atlantic Ocean. The town of Donegal and the River Eske lie at the head of the bay.

Donegal Bay is Ireland's largest bay, and also contains Ulster's highest (and Ireland's's second-highest) sea cliffs at Slieve League, which tower 1972 ft (601 m) above sea level.

Donegal Bay's beaches have some of Europe's finest surfing, caused by a combination by a direct west-facing location and the funnel-shape of Donegal Bay (the westerlies of the Atlantic Ocean get funnelled into a relatively small area, which increases the size of the swell). Rossnowlagh and Bundoran are recognised by the European surfing community as among Ireland's finest surf beaches with good facilities and excellent water quality.

== Towns on the Bay ==
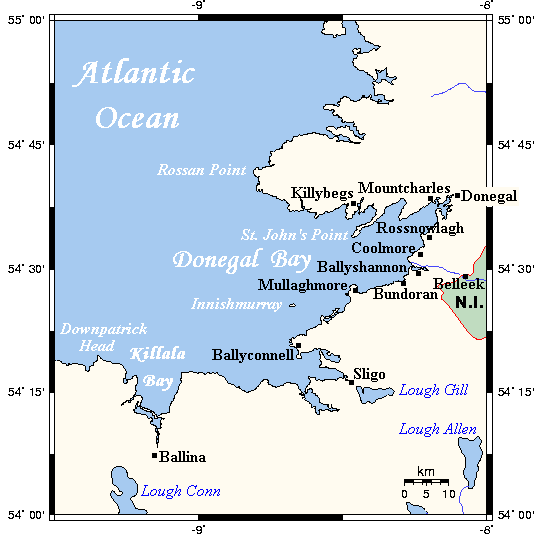
Donegal Bay on Ireland's west coast

- Ballyshannon
- Bundoran
- Coolmore
- Donegal
- Killybegs
- Mountcharles
- Mullaghmore
- Rossnowlagh
- Tullaghan

== Rivers that empty into the bay ==
- River Drowes (between Bundoran and Tullaghan)
- River Erne (at Ballyshannon)
- River Eske (at Donegal Town)

== Islands in the bay ==
- Isle of St Ernan
- Belle's Isle
- Rotten Island

== Geographical coordinates ==
- Latitude: 54° 40' N (54.67)
- Longitude: 9° 04' W (-9.07)
- NWS buoy: 62093 M4

== Other projects ==
Media related to Donegal Bay at Wikimedia Commons
