= Rossnowlagh =

Seaside village in County Donegal, Ireland

Rossnowlagh Ros Neamhlach
- Village
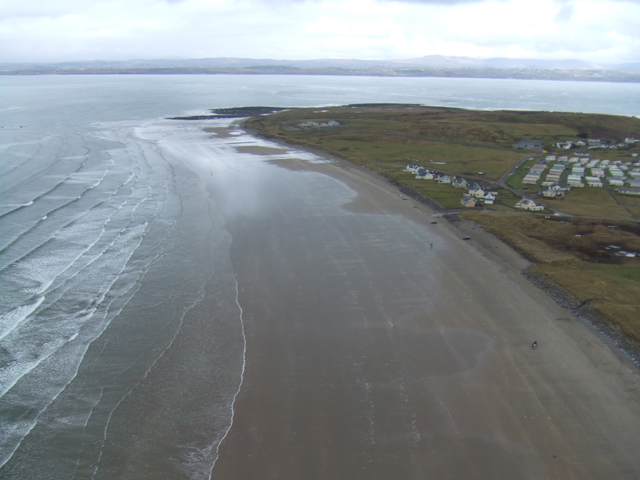
- Rossnowlagh Beach

- Location in Ireland
- Coordinates: 54°34′N 8°13′W
- Country: Ireland
- Province: Ulster
- County: County Donegal

Rossnowlagh (Irish: Ros Neamhlach) is a seaside village in the south of County Donegal, Ireland. It is about 8 kilometres (5 mi) north of Ballyshannon and 16 km (10 mi) southwest of Donegal Town. The area's 3 km (2 mi) long beach, or 2 km (1.2 mi) if measuring from the cliffs to Carrickfad (long rock in Irish, which juts out from the headland and is visible at low tide), is frequented by walkers, surfers, windsurfers, kite-surfers and swimmers.

== Beach ==
Rossnowlagh is a Blue Flag surfing beach. As the slowly rising beach faces westward into the Atlantic Ocean, and the fact that Donegal Bay has a funnel-like shape, it can increase the size of the waves, especially in winter when some large rollers are generated and it has been known to have waves up to 7 metres (20 ft) high.

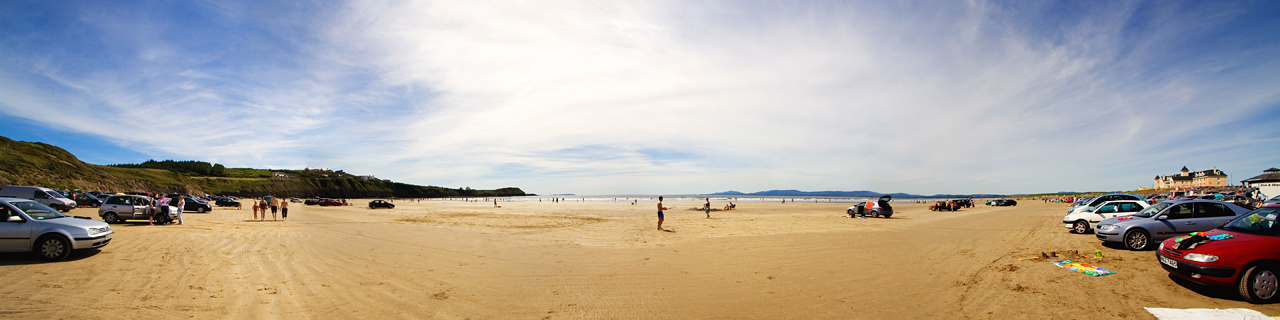
Rossnowlagh beach

Rossnowlagh has many visitors during the summer months and most of the beach is accessible by car. There is sometimes a 'beach warden' on duty and information about tidal risks may be displayed.

According to a soil erosion study of the beach at Rossnowlagh, known officially as Belalt Strand, the area consists mainly of sandy beaches, but also rocky shore platforms, sand dunes, grassland, boulder clay cliffs and rock cliffs. As of the second half of the 20th century, it was determined that the central section of the dune front was eroding at rates up to 0.6 metres (2 ft) per year, with the highest erosion rate between 1951 and 1977. Starting in 1972, short lengths of rock armour were constructed at first in front of the Sandhouse Hotel and with further additions along the shore-line; this stopped the erosion in protected parts but the dune front has a ragged appearance with up to 35 metres (115 ft) of erosion where half of the sandy shoreline has no protection.

The beach was the setting for the recording of the music video for Nathan Carter's version of Wagon Wheel.

== Amenities ==
The main amenity is the extensive beach which is frequented by walkers, joggers, sunbathers, surfers, windsurfers, kite-surfers, doggers and swimmers, and is accessible by car via 3 ramps. There is about 3 km (2 miles) of wide sandy beach although it is possible to walk several more kilometres further along the shore and all the way to Murvagh Beach. A children's playground was constructed at the main car park in 2022.

The Sandhouse Hotel is located adjacent to the beach, with a 'surfers bar' attached. Overlooking the beach and on the cliff is the Smuggler's Creek Inn restaurant and bar, and there are several shops in the area, along with a post office and shop near the Franciscan Friary as well as The Thatch Tea House nearby.

A Franciscan Friary is located up from the southern end of the beach. While there had been 500 years of Franciscan history in Donegal, this link was broken in the mid-19th century. However, the Franciscan order re-established itself in County Donegal when new friary buildings were built in Rossnowlagh in the early 1950s. The friary has a visitor centre and contains the Donegal Historical Society Museum which houses a small collection including stone age flints and old Irish musical instruments. There are also gardens which are open to visitors.

To the southwest further along the cliffs, in the distance stands the ruined Kilbarron Castle which is accessible via Creevy.

== Events ==
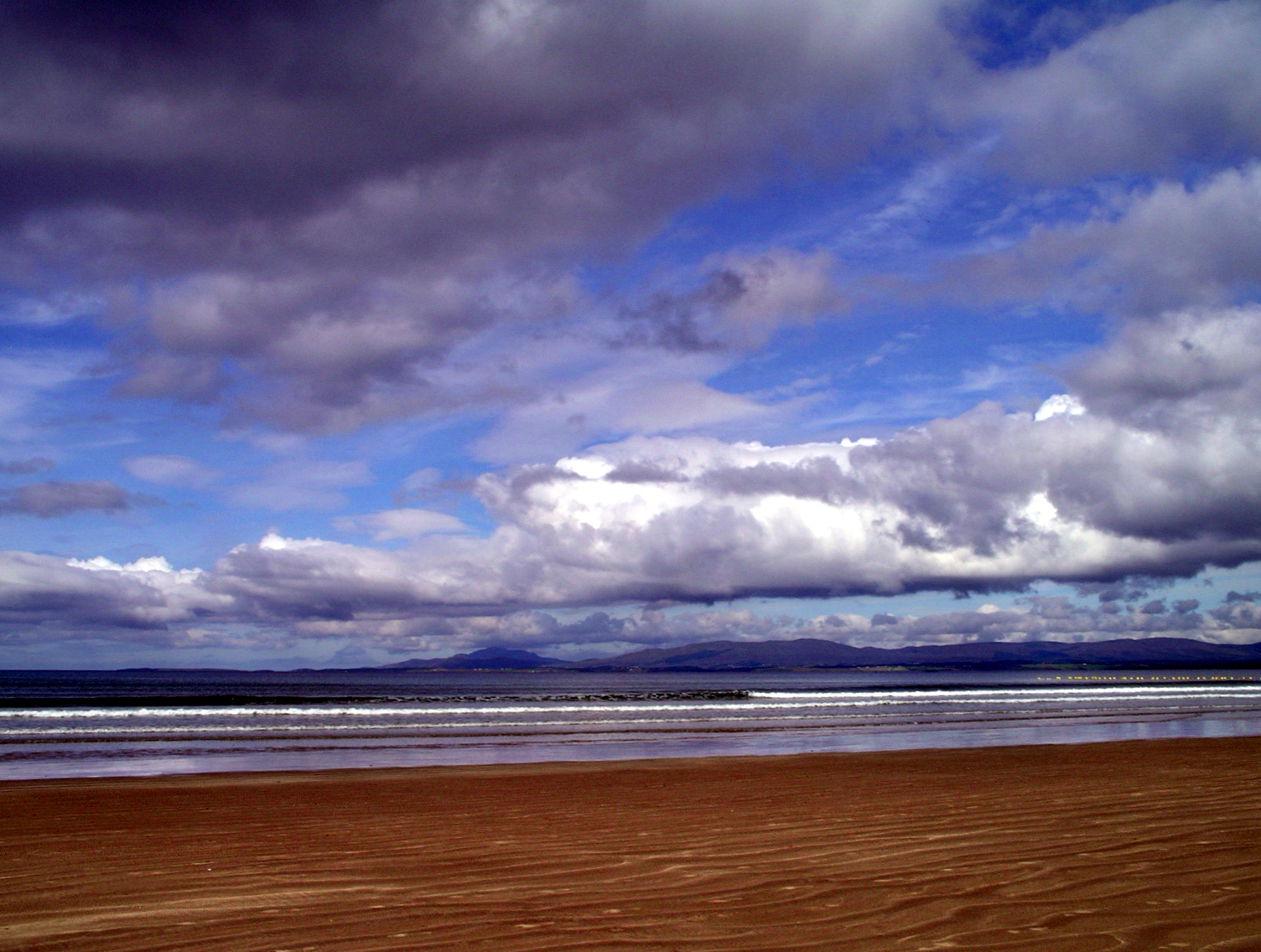
View from Rossnowlagh strand

Rossnowlagh Surf Club hosts several surfing events, some with dozens of young surfers competing. The Irish National Junior Surfing Championships have also previously been hosted in Rossnowlagh, including in 2007 where 113 young surfers contested bodyboard and longboard events. The Inter-Counties Surfing contest, Ireland's longest-running surfing contest, has been held annually in the area since 1969.

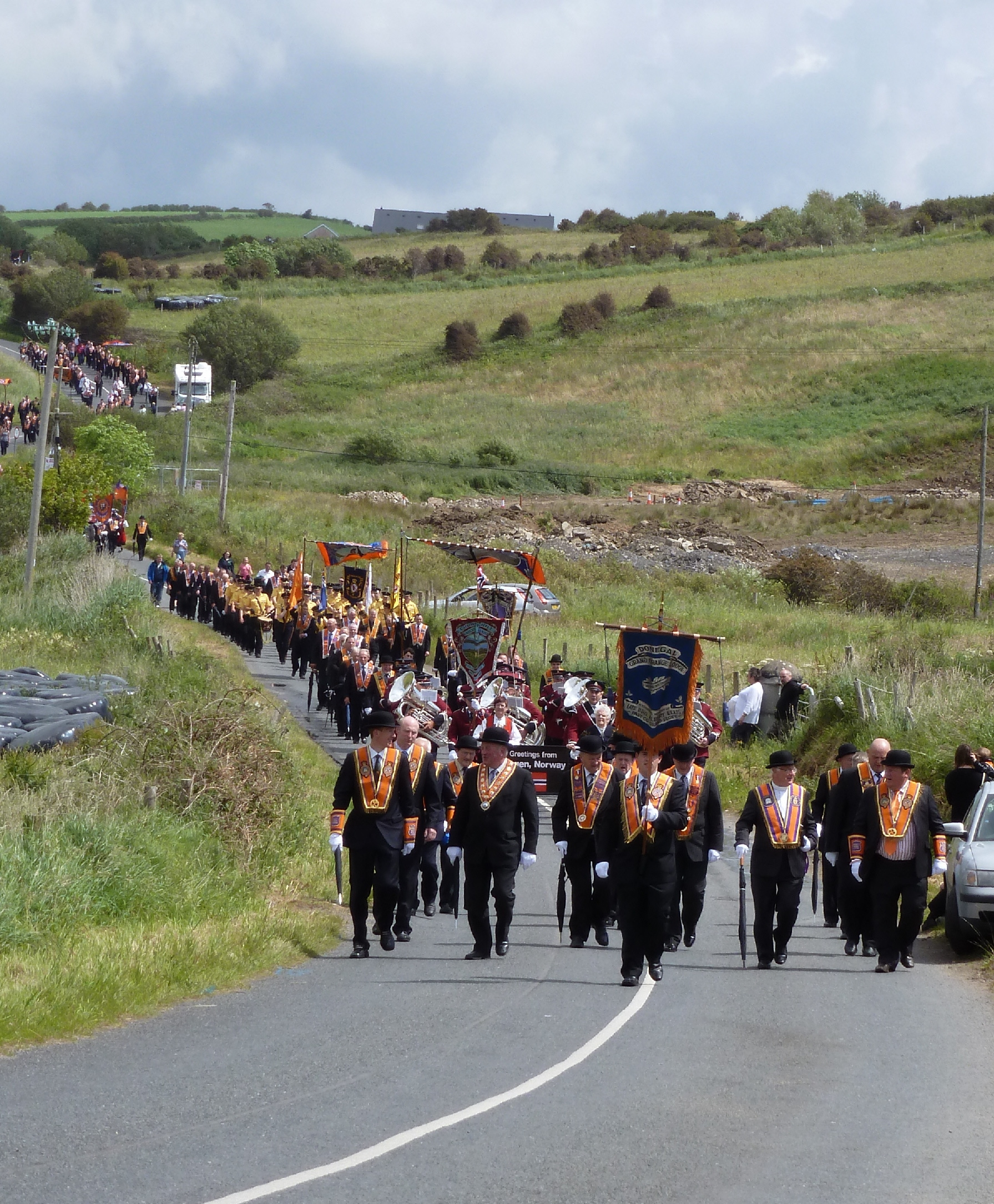
Twelfth processions in Rossnowlagh, 2011

The annual Orange Order parade for the County Donegal Orange Lodge is held each year in Rossnowlagh, usually on the Saturday before 12 July. The marchers include lodges based in Northern Ireland, but mainly the Orange lodges in the Republic of Ireland, including County Donegal, County Leitrim, County Dublin, County Monaghan and County Cavan. The Grand Orange Lodge of Australia, Africa and New Zealand have also attended the Donegal Twelfth. There is no lodge in Rossnowlagh itself.

An annual feis (traditional Gaelic arts and culture festival) is held each summer in July or August at the Franciscan Friary in Rossnowlagh. The feis is officially called the Feis of the Four Masters as one of the authors of the Annals of the Four Masters, Michael O'Cleirigh, comes from a nearby locality.

The World Rally Championship came to the Rossnowlagh area in 2007 and again in 2009. These events, organised by Rally Ireland, drew a large number of spectators to the townland of Cashel on the northern edge of Rossnowlagh. The rally stage, labelled the Donegal Bay stage, was 14 km (9 miles) long on narrow single-lane tarmac back roads. In 2007, the stage was won by Jari-Matti Latvala and in 2009 by Mikko Hirvonen. Sébastien Loeb was the overall winner of both rallies.

== Public transport ==
=== Bus ===
The TFI Local Link route from Donegal Town to Ballyshannon (route 292) serves Rossnowlagh every day.

Between 1999 and 2000, Bus Éireann route 484 served Rossnowlagh on Fridays only linking it to Ballyshannon for onward connections. Rossnowlagh also had a regular daily Bus Éireann service until the late 1980s.

=== Rail ===
The railway station nearest to Rossnowlagh is Sligo railway station.

Rossnowlagh railway station, on a branch line from Donegal town to Ballyshannon, served the village from 1905 until the line closed in 1960. It was part of the County Donegal Railways Joint Committee network with the train running towards Ballyshannon (where a walk across the town to the other station in Ballyshannon run by the Great Northern Railway of Ireland, would be required for Bundoran or Enniskillen) to the south and north to Donegal Town, Stranorlar, Strabane (where passengers could change onto the Great Northern Railway of Ireland, to reach Omagh) and Derry.

== People ==
- Easkey Britton – surfer, scientist, born Rossnowlagh

== See also ==
- List of towns and villages in Ireland
- List of abbeys and priories in Ireland (County Donegal)
- Surfing in Ireland
