= Eileen Barnes =

Irish botanical illustrator

- Born: 1876; Dublin, Ireland
- Died: 12 March 1957 (aged 80–81); Sir Patrick Dun's Hospital, Dublin
- Education: Dublin Metropolitan School of Art
- Known for: botanical illustration and model making within the National Museum of Ireland

Eileen Barnes (born Eileen Elizabeth Janet Barnes 1876–1956) was a notable and highly acclaimed botanical artist, well known for her definitive and accurate depictions of Ireland's plant life.

== Early life ==
Eileen Barnes was born in 1876 in her parents' home at 137 Great Britain Street (now Parnell Street), Dublin. She was the youngest of ten children born to Edwin and Elizabeth Barnes (née McKay). Her father was a grocer and wine merchant who had premises on Great Britain Street and at 57 Camden Street. Barnes attended Rutland School for Girls in Dublin, going on to enroll in the Dublin Metropolitan School of Art in 1898 and 1899. She received an Art Teacher's Certificate in 1899. Immediately after leaving the School of Art Barnes worked as a governess in County Tipperary, teaching the two daughters of Anna Maria Cooper-Chadwick. On the 10th of January 1990 Eileen received an award for her art, presented to her by Countess Beatrix Cadogan, wife of George Cadogan.

== Career ==
She spent most of her career working with the National Museum of Ireland's natural history and antique's division, helping the naturalist Robert Lloyd Praeger and botanist Matilda Knowles, as well as creating models for the museum's exhibits. Her association with the Natural Museum in Dublin appears to have begun in 1907, when she is recorded as donating models of the eggs of a platypus. By 1909 she appears to be working in the museum, setting up exhibition cases, constructing models of natural habitats, and wax models. Many of these examples, such as the rock pool and mammal displays that are still exhibited on the ground floor of the Natural History Museum, are believed to be her work. Her formal position within the Museum is unclear, with her at times being referred to as a staff member or the "Museum Artist".

Barnes illustrated cephalopoda for Annie Massy, such as those collected by the 1910-1913 British Antarctic expedition. She undertook similar illustration work for the sponge expert, Jane Stephens, illustrating a number of her publications. She also illustrated the Foraminifera collected during the Clare Island Survey. Her work was highly regarded by Praeger, who even went as far as to name one of his plants after her (Sedum barnesianum). Barnes' works have been featured in numerous books and monographs, and still highly regarded today, especially her sedums (stonecrops) and sempervivums (house leeks). She worked with Robert Francis Scharff to reconstruct and illustrate specimens of the Giant Irish deer. Barnes also undertook some cartographic work with the Geological Survey of Ireland from the 1920s until 1938, and worked on restoration of archaeological artifacts from the Royal Irish Academy. She also assisted Mary Eily de Putron when she was working at the museum.

Barnes was a member of the Dublin Naturalists' Field Club from 1913. It is believed she collected specimens of lichen, with one specimen found in the herbarium of the Irish National Botanic Gardens (Ireland).

Barnes also had her own studio in Kenilworth Square, where she worked on other private commissions for various institutions such as the RDS, the Royal Society of Antiquaries of Ireland, and the Royal Irish Academy, as well as working with other academics. F. Elrington Ball used four of her sketches in his work A history of the county of Dublin.

== Later life and death ==
Barnes retired from her work with the Museum at some point after March 1947, though continued to restore artifacts on behalf of the Museum into the 1950s. She lived with her mother and siblings until their deaths. None of her five siblings who reached adulthood married, meaning that Barnes had no close family when she died in 1956. Neither Barnes birth or death was officially registered, with her date of death remaining undocumented until 2015. She was admitted to Sir Patrick Dun's Hospital on 13 February 1956, undergoing an operation to "extensive burns" on 27 February. She later died on 12 March, and was buried alongside her siblings Herbert and Edith on 14 March 1956.
