= Clare Island Survey =

1909–1911 scientific survey of island off west coast of Ireland

The Clare Island Survey was a multidisciplinary (zoological, botanical, archaeological, and geological) survey of Clare Island, off the west coast of Ireland.

The survey, which followed a similar survey of Lambay Island in 1905 and 1906, was proposed by Robert Lloyd Praeger and in April 1908 a committee was formed to recruit and organise the work of over one hundred scientists from Ireland, England, Denmark, Germany and Switzerland and the data collected during three years of field work on the island (1909-1911). The committee members were Robert Lloyd Praeger, Robert Francis Scharff, Richard Manliffe Barrington, Grenville Cole, Nathaniel Colgan and Henry William Lett.

The bulk of the work is concerned with systematic zoology and botany but paid special attention to questions of geographical distribution, dispersal, and ecology and covered antiquities, place-names, family names, geology, climatology, agriculture and meteorology.

The results were published both as A Biological Survey of Clare Island in the County of Mayo, Ireland and of the Adjoining District. Parts 1-68 (part 8 was never published) Dublin Hodges, Figgis, & Co., Ltd., for the Royal Irish Academy, 1911-1915.:The sections are Introduction, Archaeology, Irish Names, Agriculture, Climatology, Geology, Botany, Zoology and as separate parts in the Proceedings of the Royal Irish Academy.

The parts are:

- Part 1 Introduction and General Narrative Robert John Welch, Robert Lloyd Praeger
- Part 2. History and Archaeology T. J. Westropp
- Part 3. Place-Names and Family Names John Macneill
- Part 4. Gaelic Plant and Animal Names and Associated Folk-Lore Nathaniel Colgan (also worked on marine mollusca and algae)
- Part 5. Agriculture and its History James Wilson (Irish naturalist)
- Part 6 Climatology W. J. Lyons
- Part 7 Geology Edward Alexander Newell Arber and Timothy Hallissy
- Part 8 not published
- Part 9 Tree growth Arthur C. Forbes
- Part 10: Phanerogamia and Pteridophyta Robert Lloyd Praeger (also vegetation map, marine dredging, marine algae, fungi, sponges and mollusca with Hedwig Praeger)
- Parts 11–12: Musci and Hepaticae Henry William Lett
- Part 13 Fungi Henry Hawley (naturalist)
- Part 14 Lichens Annie Lorrain Smith
- Part 15 Marine Algae Arthur Disbrowe Cotton
- Part 16 Fresh-water algae, with a supplement of marine diatoms William West
- Part 17 Mammalia Gerald Edwin Hamilton Barrett-Hamilton
- Part 18 Reptilia and Amphibia Robert Francis Scharff (also worked on Molluscs & woodlice)
- Part 19 Fish George Philip Farran (also worked on marine dredging)
- Part 20 Aves Richard John Ussher
- Part 21 Tunicata and Hemichorda George Philip Farran
- Part 22 Marine Mollusca Nathaniel Colgan.
- Part 23 Land and Fresh-water Mollusca Arthur Wilson Stelfox
- Part 24 Hymenoptera Claude Morley
- Part 25 Diptera Percy Hall Grimshaw online here
- Part 26 Lepidoptera William Francis de Vismes Kane
- Part 27 Neuroptera James Nathaniel Halbert (also worked on other insects (all orders))
- Part 28 Terrestrial Coleoptera James Nathaniel Halbert
- Part 29 Aquatic Coleoptyera William Alexander Francis Balfour Browne (also worked on land beetles and other insects (all orders))
- Part 30 Hemiptera James Nathaniel Halbert
- Part 31 Orthoptera George Carpenter (also worked on other insects (all orders))
- Part 32 Apterygota George Carpenter
- Part 33 Chilopoda and Diplopoda William Frederick Johnson (also worked on other insects (all orders))
- Part 34 Pycnogonida George Carpenter
- Part 35 Araneae Denis Robert Pack-Beresford
- Part 36 Phalangida Denis Robert Pack-Beresford
- Part 37 Arctiscoida James Murray
- Part 38 Pseudoscorpiones Harry Wallis Kew
- Part 39 Acarinida: Section I: Hydracarina
- Part 39b Acarinida: Section II Terrestrial and Marine Acarina James Nathaniel Halbert
- Part 40 Decapoda George Philip Farran
- Part 41 Nebaliacea Walter Medley Tattersall (also marine dredging)
- Part 42 Amphipoda Walter Medley Tattersall
- Part 43 Marine lsopoda and Tanaidacea Walter Medley Tattersall
- Part 44 Land and Fresh-Water Isopoda Nevin Harkness Foster (also worked on birds)
- Part 45 Marine Entomostraca George Philip Farran
- Part 46 Fresh-water Entomostraca David Joseph Scourfield
- Part 47 Archiannelida and Polychaeta Rowland Southern (also marine dredging)
- Part 48 Gephyrea Rowland Southern
- Part 49 Oligochaeta Rowland Southern
- Part 50 Hirudinea Rowland Southern
- Part 51 Rotifera Charles F. Rousselet
- Part 52 Rotifera Bdelloida James Murray
- Part 53 Polyzoa Albert Russell Nichols
- Part 54 Nemathelmia, Kinorhyncha, and Chaetognatha Rowland Southern
- Part 55: Nemertinea Rowland Southern
- Part 56 Platyhelmia Rowland Southern
- Part 57 Echinodermata Albert Russell Nichols
- Part 58 Coelenterata Jane Stephens
- Part 59 Marine Porifera Jane Stephens
- Part 60 Fresh-water Porifera Jane Stephens
- Part 61 and 62 Flagellata and Ciliata John Samuel Dunkerly (also other Infusoria)
- Part 63 Mycetozoa Gulielma Lister
- Part 64 Foraminifera Arthur Earland and Edward Heron-Allen
- Part 65 Foraminifera G.H. Wailes
- Part 66. Notes on marine plankton George Philip Farran
- Part 67 Marine Ecology Roland Southern
- Part 68 General Summary Robert Lloyd Praeger

Nonpublishing participants John Adams (naturalist) (Marine algae); Edward Alexander Newell Arber (Geology); James Bayley Butler (Protozoa); Frederik Børgesen (Marine algae); George W. Chaster (Mollusca); Grenville Cole (Geology), George Fogerty (Archaeology); Thomas Greer (Lepidoptera); David Thomas Gwynne-Vaughan (botany); Arthur William Hill (Botany); John De Witt Hinch (Glacial geology); Stanley Wells Kemp (marine dredging); Matilda Cullen Knowles (lichens, flowering plants, peat deposits); David McArdle (Mosses and hepatics); James Napier Milne (insects); Charles Joseph Patten (birds); Eugène Penard (rhizopods); Walter Mead Rankin (Crustacea and Decapoda); Colin M. Selbie (marine dredging and Crustacea); Otto Stapf (botany); Isaac Swain (geology)
