= Annie Massy =

Irish marine biologist

- Born: 29 January 1868; Netley, Hampshire, UK
- Died: 17 April 1931 (aged 63); Howth, County Dublin, Ireland
- Known for: International expert on molluscs
- Scientific career
- Fields: marine biology ornithology
- Workplaces: Department of Agriculture and Technical Instruction for Ireland (DATI)

Annie Letitia Massy (29 January 1868 – 17 April 1931) was a self-taught marine biologist, ornithologist, and an internationally recognised expert on molluscs, in particular cephalopods. She was one of the founders of the Irish Society for the Protection of Birds in 1904. Many of the details of her life are unknown which is attributed to the fact that she is often described as a shy and retiring person, with no known photograph of her in existence.

== Early life and education ==
Massy was born in Netley, Hampshire on 29 January 1868. The family home was Stagdale Lodge close to the border of County Tipperary and County Limerick. She was the third child of four to parents Annie and Hugh Deane Massy, descendants of Hamon de Massey. Her father was a surgeon in the British Army and was probably working at the Royal Victoria military hospital in Netley at the time of Annie's birth. She grew up in Malahide, living close to the well known mollusc collecting location the Velvet Strand, spending some time in Enniskerry, County Wicklow. She was probably educated at home, and appeared to develop an interest in nature from an early age. She made her first contribution to Irish zoological records at age 18 in 1885 by observing the first pair of nesting redstarts in Ireland in Powerscourt Estate, County Wicklow. From then on, she became a regular contributor to the Irish Naturalist journal.

== Career ==
Due to her membership of the Dublin Naturalists' Field Club, and the knowledge she developed, in 1901 she was employed as a temporary Assistant Naturalist as part of the fisheries division of the Department of Agriculture and Technical Instruction for Ireland (DATI). She was employed on this basis until her death in 1931. The period from 1901 to 1914 was particularly productive for Irish marine biology with extensive investigations of the Irish coasts. This included the expeditions of HMS Helga which engaged in trawling, dredging and tow-netting. Through this work she would have collaborated with Jane Stephens, Maude Delap, Edgar W.L. Holt and Rowland Southern. Her international reputation in the identification of marine species led to specimens being sent to her from all over the world.

In 1913, Massy published a paper in which she examined the commonly held belief that rings observed on oysters served to age the specimens in a similar manner to tree rings. Her examination of over 600 specimens demonstrated that there was no clear association between these rings and specimen age.

She maintained her interest in ornithology in her personal life, leading to her being one of the founding members of the Irish Society for the Protection of Birds (now BirdWatch Ireland) in 1904. She stepped in as honorary secretary in 1926 when the group almost disbanded, aiding in the revitalisation of the group which culminated in the Wild Birds Protection Act of 1930.

== Later life and recognition ==
Massy died 17 April 1931 at home in Howth, County Dublin from stomach cancer after a short illness. Some sources record her date of death as 16 April or 19 April. She was buried at St Andrew's church, Malahide. She resigned from the Irish Society for the Protection of Birds just three days before her death. She ended her resignation letter by writing "The shearwaters are great company to me at night, and the ravens by day". Robert Lloyd Praeger wrote in her obituary in the Irish Naturalists' Journal that "even the ravens would miss her". Her death was noted in The Irish Times and in the journal Nature.

Four cephalopod species have been named in her honour: Opisthoteuthis massyae (Pfeffer, 1912), (a specimen of which can be seen in the Natural History Museum, Dublin), Pholidoteuthis massyae (Grimpe, 1920), Bolitaena massyae (Robson, 1924), and Eledone massyae Voss, 1964. A genus of pteropod, Massya, was also named in her honour. She herself named nine species of cephalopod. Much of her large collection of marine specimens are in the collections of the Natural History Museum, Dublin, as well the Natural History Museum, London.

== Publications ==
- 1907 Preliminary notice of new and remarkable cephalopods from the South-west Coast of Ireland
- 1916 The Cephalopoda of the Indian Museum
- 1917 The gymnosomatous Pteropoda of the coasts of Ireland
- 1918 A note on Loligo media (L.)
- 1928 The Cephalopoda of the Irish coast
- 1930 Mollusca of the Irish Atlantic Slope
- 1932 Mollusca: Gastropoda Thecosomata and Gymnosomata
