= Albert Russell Nichols =

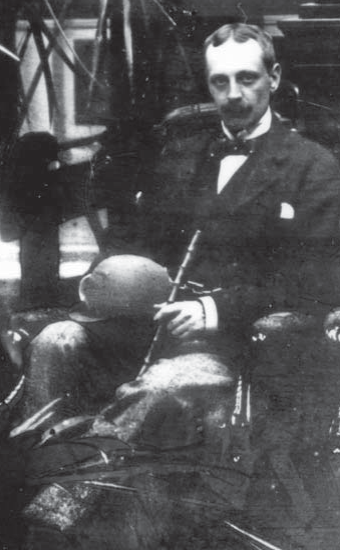
- Nichols at the opening of the new Museum of Art and Science building on Kildare Street, Dublin in 1890
- Born: January 1859; Stowmarket, Suffolk, England
- Died: 21 February 1933 (aged 74); Dublin, Ireland

Albert Russell Nichols (1859–1933) was an English museum curator and zoologist who worked mainly in Ireland.

== Early life and family ==
Albert Russell Nichols was born in Stowmarket, Suffolk in January 1859. His parents were Arthur, an ironmonger, and Sarah Nichols. He had two younger siblings, a brother, Ernest, and a sister, Emily Grace. Nichols was educated at Clare College, Cambridge, graduating B.A. in mathematics as 16th wrangler in 1882.

Nichols married Letitia Anne Perry on 20 July 1892, and lived in 30 Grosvenor Square, Rathmines. They had a daughter, Beryl, who was a noted actress with RTÉ. Nichols died on 21 February 1933, and was buried in Mount Jerome Cemetery.

== Career ==
Nichols came from England to Dublin in 1883 as Assistant in the Museum of Science and Art, now the National Museum of Ireland (NMI). He worked on zoology, classifying and arranging the invertebrates throughout his forty-one years of service. He was promoted to assistant keeper in 1905, becoming keeper of the Natural History Division following the retirement of Robert Francis Scharff in 1921. He retired in 1924.

Nichols took part in the Lord Bandon dredging expedition of 1886 with Alfred Cort Haddon, sponsored by the Royal Irish Academy, and in the biological surveys of Lambay, Clare Island and Malahide. He was elected a member of the Royal Irish Academy, and served as vice-president of the Dublin Naturalists' Field Club. He was president of the Dublin Microscopical Club from 1910 to 1912.

He compiled or revised lists of echinoderms, bryozoa, marine mollusca, and birds of Ireland, published by the NMI or by the Royal Irish Academy. Many of his specimens are in the collections of the NMI.
