= Mary Leebody =

Northern Irish botanist

- Born: 1847; Portaferry, County Down, Ireland
- Died: 19 September 1911 (aged 64); Derry, County Londonderry
- Scientific career
- Fields: Botany

Mary Isabella Leebody (or Mary Elizabeth Leebody; 1847–1911) was an Irish botanist, known for her work on the flora of County Londonderry and County Donegal. Leebody discovered a number of rare plants in Ireland, including the orchid Spiranthes romanzoffiana and Teesdalia nudicaulis, the common shepherd's-cress. Leebody was also known for her encouragement of other botanists.

== Life ==
Mary Leebody was born in Portaferry, County Down around 1847. She is sometimes known as Mary Elizabeth Leebody, and in other sources Mary Isabella Leebody. About 1867, she married mathematician Professor John Robinson Leebody of Foyle College, Derry, living the rest of her life in the city. Leebody died in Derry on 19 September 1911.

== Botanical work ==
Known as a diligent field botanist, Leebody's work focused on Counties Antrim, Londonderry, and Donegal. Leebody's most active years were between 1893 and 1904, and she was an acquaintance of Robert Lloyd Praeger. She was an active member of the Belfast Naturalists' Field Club, rarely missing a field trip. She was also known for encouraging other people to take up botany, although she did not take up Praeger's idea of setting up a Derry Naturalists' Field Club. During the 1890s she collaborated with Praeger and Matilda Cullen Knowles, contributing many of the Derry plant material for Praeger's 1895 The Flora of the North-east of Ireland supplement.

Leebody is credited with adding a number of new Irish records, including American orchid Spiranthes romanzoffiana, in 1893, marking the beginning of her published work. This find was notable as it increased the recorded range for the rare species. Other records she published were Dryas octopetala on Muckish, Teesdalia nudicaulis on Lough Neagh, and Liparis loeselii on Slieve Snaght.
