= Calcicole =

Guild of plants

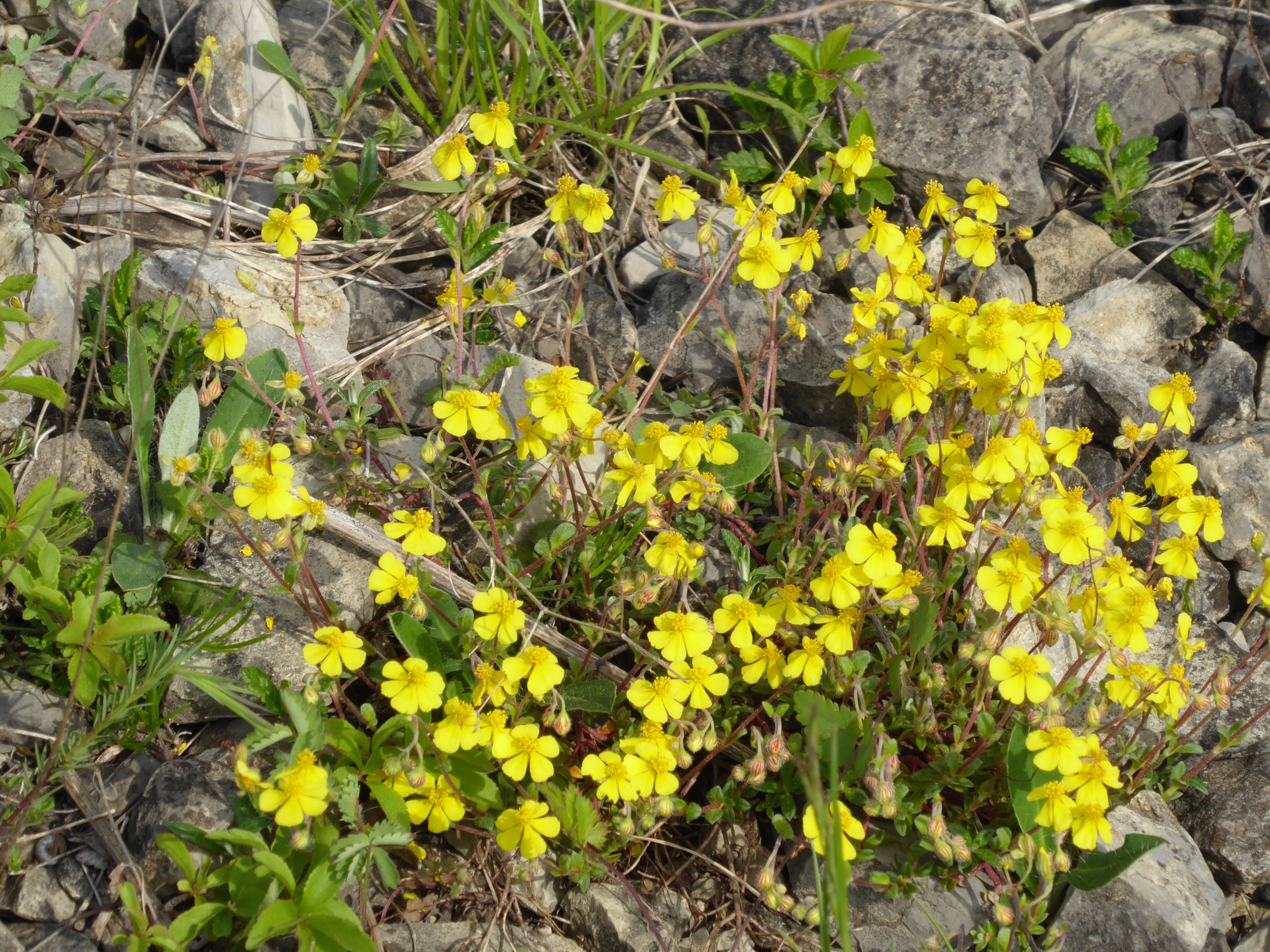
Common rock-rose forming low mats on shell limestone and sandy soil of the Saupurzel, a limestone hill in Bavaria

Calcicoles—literally "lime‑dwellers"—are organisms, most commonly vascular plants but also including bryophytes, lichens and other taxa, that grow preferentially on calcium-rich, often alkaline, substrates. Because they grow only on specific lime-rich soils, calcicoles give ecologists a clear, real-world example of how soil chemistry determines where organisms can live. Their distribution on chalk, limestone and other calcareous rocks reflects a suite of physiological adaptations that enable them to regulate cytosolic Ca^{2+}, acquire otherwise insoluble iron and phosphorus, and withstand high soil pH. In contrast, calcifuges ("lime‑avoiders") dominate on acidic, aluminium‑rich soils. Modern research has linked the calcicole habit to indicators such as Heinz Ellenberg's soil‑reaction values and the Index of calcifugy, while pharmacognostic studies have uncovered an array of bioactive compounds in many limestone specialists.

== Terminology and historical use ==
The term calcicole entered the English botanical lexicon in 1895, when the Irish naturalist Nathaniel Colgan applied it to the pyramidal orchid (Anacamptis pyramidalis) growing on the lime‑rich soils of County Dublin. Earlier continental authors had used cognate expressions such as calciphile and calciphyte, but British and Irish field botanists adopted Colgan's wording almost immediately. Although alternative labels—acidofuge, lime lover—appear in the literature, calcicole remains dominant, in part because it highlights habitat rather than chemistry or physiology.

During the twentieth century, ecologists refined the concept by contrasting calcicoles with calcifuges and by recognising "strict" versus "non‑strict" calcicoles, depending on whether a species is confined to calcareous soils or merely favours them. Subsequent classifications divided the group further into obligate and facultative calcicoles on the basis of leaf Ca^{2+}:Mg^{2+} ratios, or into "extreme" and "moderate" calcicoles according to whether they require pH above 7 or tolerate pH 5–7.

== Soil ecology and distribution ==
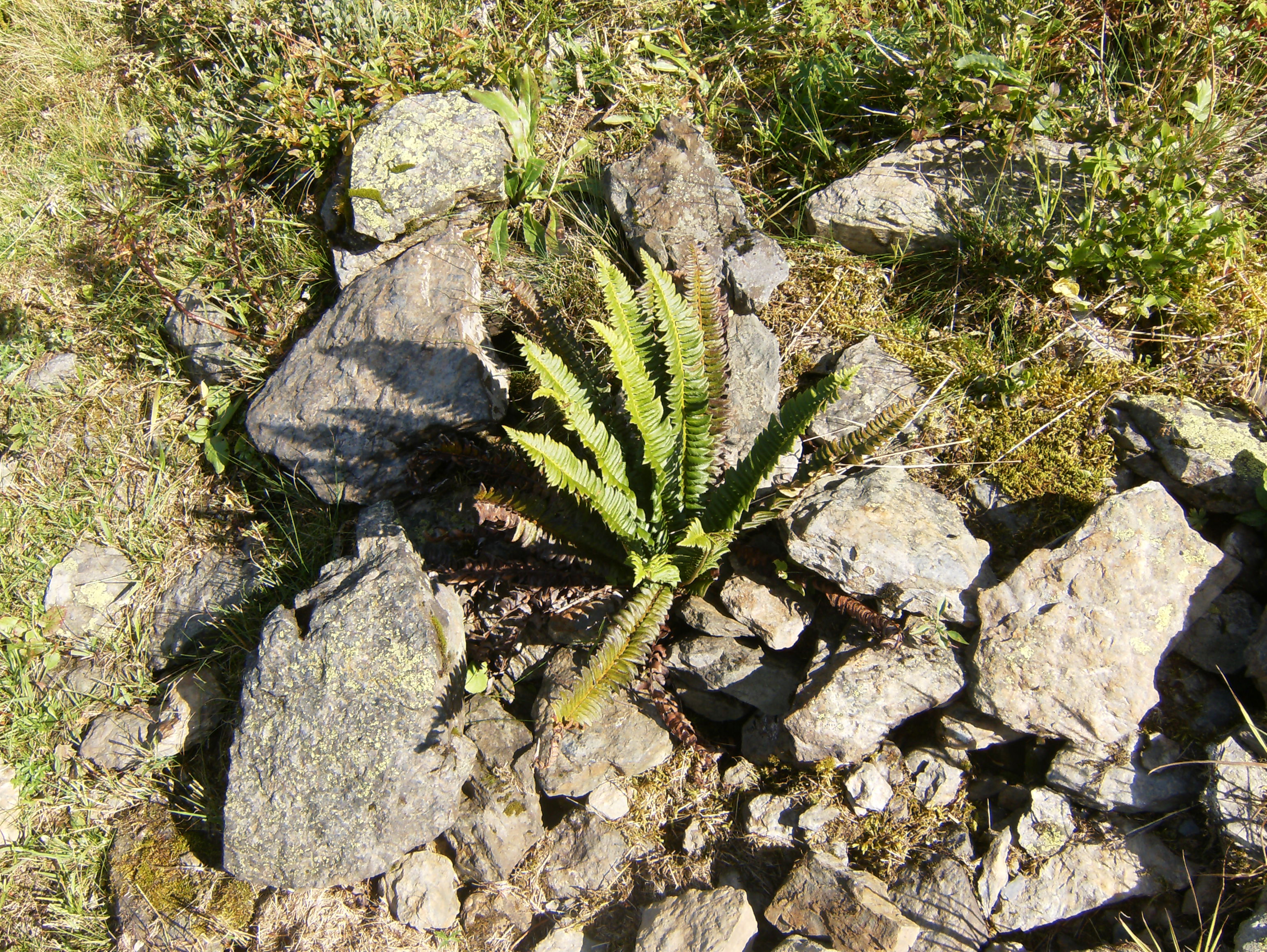
Holly fern rooted in alpine scree near the tree line in Grindelwald, Switzerland

Calcicoles are conspicuous components of chalk grasslands, karst shrublands and Mediterranean garrigue, but they also occur on serpentine outcrops, metalliferous spoil and anthropogenic rubble where calcium carbonate buffers soil acidity. Families with many limestone specialists include Asteraceae, Caryophyllaceae, Poaceae and saxicolous (rock-dwelling) ferns such as Asplenium and Polystichum. Mosses (such as Tortula, Grimmia) and lichens (e.g. Cladonia rangiformis) likewise display calcicole–calcifuge pairs that partition the microhabitat. A 2024 global survey of "limestone ferns" estimates that calcicole species make up 8–13% of regional fern floras (rising to more than 50% in some genera such as Asplenium and Adiantum), underlining the breadth of edaphic specialisation within the group.

The geographic range of individual species may be narrow—Grevillea thelemanniana is endemic to a single limestone ridge in Western Australia—or continental, as with the grass Sesleria caerulea, which extends from Ireland to the Balkans. At landscape scale, patchy exposures of marl or dolomite create edaphic islands that shape genetic divergence; population studies on Ranunculus alpestris and other alpine calcicoles show historical isolation despite contemporary gene flow.

== Physiological adaptations ==
Calcicoles avoid calcium toxicity through a combination of low root‑membrane affinity for Ca^{2+}, sequestration of soluble Ca^{c+} in vacuoles, and precipitation as calcium oxalate or calcium phosphate—often visible as crystals in trichome tip cells and epidermal bladders. Such compartmentation doubles as an osmotic adjustment mechanism in drought‑prone limestone habitats.

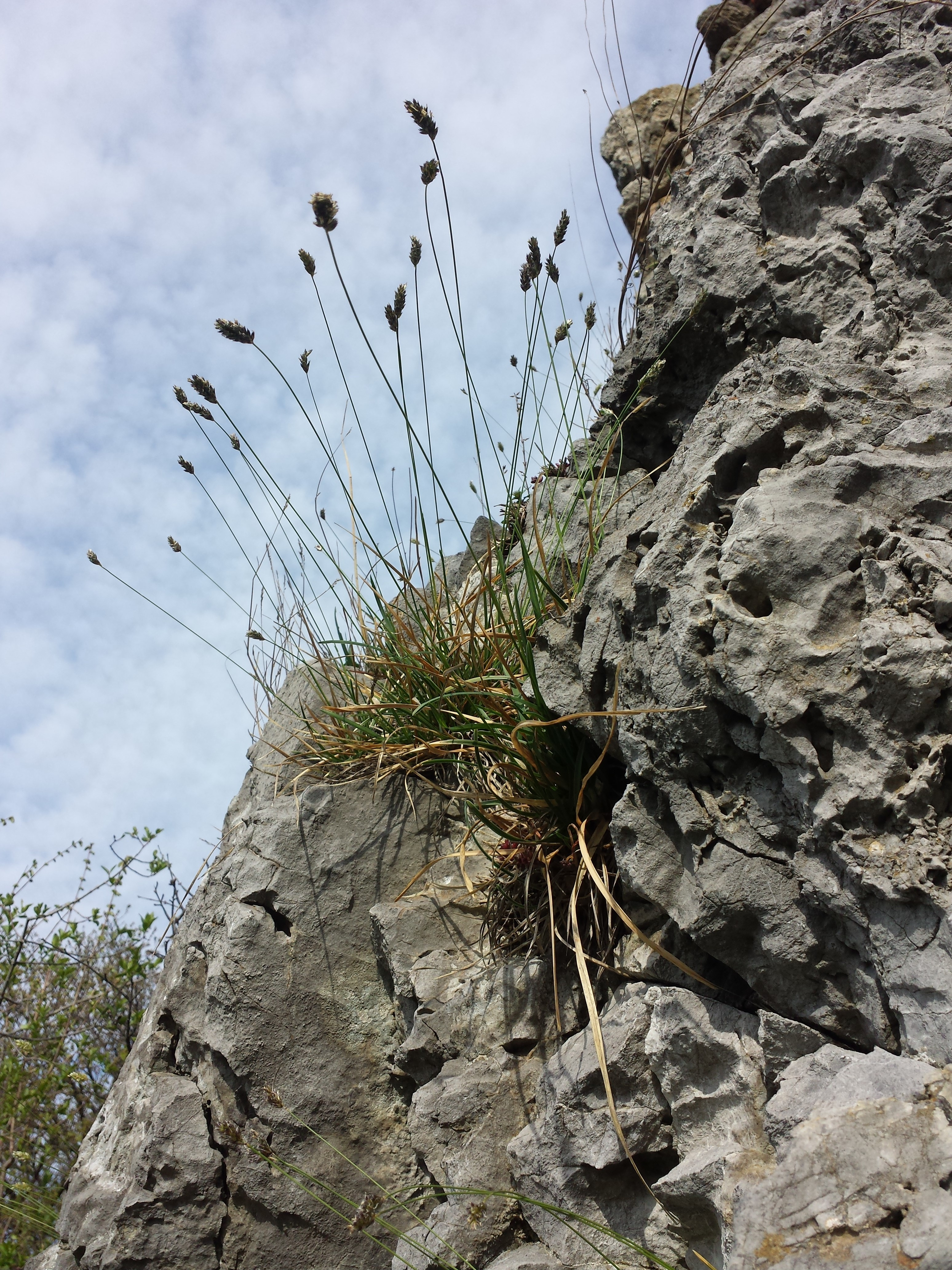
Blue moor-grass tussock (Sesleria caerulea) growing amongst hard carbonate rocks in Mödling, Lower Austria

High pH reduces Fe^{3+} and PO^{3−}_{4} solubility, yet calcicoles maintain micronutrient supply by releasing phytosiderophores and carboxylates (citric and oxalic acids) that chelate iron and mobilise phosphorus. Symbioses with ecto‑ and ericoid mycorrhizal fungi further enhance uptake: fungal hyphae precipitate excess Ca^{2+} externally while transporting Fe and P to the host. The IRONMAN (IMA) peptide family fine-tunes these responses by adjusting root‑level Fe‑uptake genes in relation to rhizosphere pH.

Nitrogen nutrition also diverges between strategies. Calcicoles grow best on nitrate-derived nitrogen, whereas calcifuges tolerate ammonium-derived nitrogen; this difference, together with aluminium sensitivity in calcicoles, reinforces the edaphic split between the two guilds. Collectively, these traits illustrate how a single element—calcium—can dictate a complex ecological syndrome.

== Indicator values and assessment tools ==
Quantitative indices permit rapid assignment of species to the calcicole–calcifuge spectrum. Etherington's Index of calcifugy expresses the proportion of a species' occurrences on soils with pH below 5.5 relative to all records; values near 0 identify strict calcicoles. Ellenberg's soil‑reaction (R) scale places most European calcicoles at R = 7–9, whereas Elias Landolt's Swiss system designates RL = 5 (above pH 6.5) as a "strict calcicole" score. These ordinal approaches, though region‑specific, have proved transferable after recalibration and now underpin vegetation monitoring across Europe and the Caucasus.

== Phytochemistry and pharmacological research ==
Many calcicoles synthesise secondary metabolites of medicinal interest. Beet (Beta vulgaris) roots yield betalains with anti-inflammatory and nephroprotective effects, while Leontodon hispidus produces hypocretenolides active in topical inflammation models. Polyphenol‑rich extracts of Anthyllis vulneraria, Veronica spicata and wheat (Triticum aestivum) show antioxidant capacity, and saponins from Medicago sativa inhibit Candida albicans. Antibacterial synergy between Artemisia rupestris flavonoids and fluoroquinolones demonstrates the pharmaceutical potential of limestone floras, hitherto overlooked in ethnobotanical surveys.
