= The Way That I Went =

1937 book about the natural history of Ireland

- Dustjacket of the first edition
- Author: Robert Lloyd Praeger
- Language: English
- Subject: Natural history, travel
- Genre: Travel writing, biography
- Publisher: Hodges, Figgis & Co.
- Publication date: 1937
- Publication place: Ireland
- Pages: 394

The Way That I Went: An Irishman in Ireland is a travel and natural-history book by Irish botanist and naturalist Robert Lloyd Praeger (1865–1953) which draws on knowledge gained from his many journeys throughout the island of Ireland.

First published in 1937 to commemorate Praeger's 70th birthday, it describes his many journeys throughout Ireland and his observations of the country's landscape, botany, zoology, geology and archaeology. The Geographical Journal noted it as "an attractive mixture of geography, natural history and personal reminiscence" whilst Books Ireland reviewed it as "an extended prose poem of nature and humanity" resonating with wisdom and beauty. It has also been described as a biographical work, and the work for which Praeger is perhaps best known.

Praeger undertook the journeys described in the book over approximately five years (1896-1900), and supplemented with additional journeys in the years after, travelling mainly during weekends and holidays. The journeys covered approximately 5,000 miles and took him through many parts of Ireland, including remote mountainous, coastal and bog landscapes. Gill Books describes how Praeger walked a "mazy 5,000 miles across hills and bogs, swimming through flooded caverns, staying out all night on islands, sifting fossil bones and exploring cattle-tramped tombs. That was when conservation was still in the future, farmers welcomed rambling strangers, bogs were intact, bungalows, cars, ESB poles and chain saws were absent, and the countryside was largely tourist-free."

== Background ==
Praeger was one of Ireland's prominent field botanists and naturalists. At the time of the book's publication, a contemporary review named him as having been the "acknowledged leader" in Irish botanical studies for the preceding 40 years.

He was born in County Down in 1865 and joined the Belfast Naturalists' Field Club at the age of 11, where he "probed wonderingly into the fairyland of nature." He was educated at Queen's College Belfast and later worked at the National Library of Ireland in Dublin, where he served as librarian from 1893 to 1924. He was president of the Royal Irish Academy from 1931 to 1934.

Praeger's scientific interests extended beyond botany to geology, archaeology and the wider natural history of Ireland. These interests are reflected throughout The Way That I Went, as noted by Praeger in the book: "It was my Field Club training that led to a deep interest in all natural phenomena which Ireland affords, and to raids into every portion of it."

== Contents ==
The book is organised geographically rather than as a continuous chronological account. The opening sections include "Donegal", "The Volcanic North" and "The Silurian Region".

Praeger's journeys take him through numerous regions of Ireland. His observations encompass mountains, lakes, caves, coastlines, islands, bogs, plants, animals, geological formations and archaeological remains.

One of the archaeological sites described in the book is Carrowkeel Megalithic Cemetery in County Sligo. Praeger was involved in archaeological investigations at Carrowkeel in the early 20th century, and his descriptions of the passage tombs have subsequently been cited in accounts of the site.

=== Style and themes ===
The Way That I Went combines travel narrative with natural-history observation. Praeger frequently describes the physical difficulties of travelling through remote areas before turning to observations of their geological, botanical, zoological or archaeological characteristics.

The book also provides a record of the Irish landscape during the early decades of the 20th century. Its descriptions of vegetation, wildlife, geological formations and archaeological monuments have subsequently been of interest to readers concerned with the history of the Irish countryside and its natural environment.

== Reception ==
A contemporary review in the journal Nature described the book as combining facts and reminiscences concerning the topography, geology and natural history of Ireland. The reviewer noted that its geographical organisation allowed individual sections to be read separately.

Irish historian Aubrey Gwynn (1892–1983), reviewing the book in 1937 for Studies: An Irish Quarterly Review, wrote:

Geology and archaeology are only second to botany in his choice of scientific study, if we may trust the space which is allotted to them in this book. But Dr. Praeger has an interest which is very much keener and more living than his interest in any of these technical sciences; his sheer love for the hills and lakes of Ireland, the seas around our shores, and the clouds in the sky above us. To all those who love Ireland chiefly for the natural beauties which abound in our midst, this book will be a source of endless pleasure.

The book continued to receive attention following its republication. In 2014, the Irish Independent reviewed the new edition and described Praeger's work as an important contribution to Irish botanical writing.

== Publication history ==
The first edition was published in Dublin in 1937 by Hodges, Figgis & Co. The National Library of Ireland records the first edition as comprising 394 pages, with plates, maps and illustrations. A further edition was published in 1939, followed by an edition from Methuen in 1947.

The book was republished by the Collins Press in 1997. The National Library of Ireland records the edition as a special publication commemorating the 60th anniversary of the first edition. The magazine Books Ireland wrote: "Much talked of and quoted, this is a book that has gained importance as we have gained consciousness of and responsibility for our environment."

A further edition was published by the Collins Press in 2014, with an introduction by Michael Viney.

== Legacy ==
The Way That I Went has remained in print through successive editions and is regarded as Praeger's principal work of travel and natural-history writing. The book is also a historical record of Irish landscapes during the period in which Praeger travelled, and his observations sometimes documented conditions which have subsequently changed. As noted in the afterword of the 1980 edition:

A quarter of a century does little to alter the appearance of vegetation, mountains and ruins and there are not many changes to be made in Praeger's account. In a few cases further research has rendered his ideas obsolete. There have been interesting fluctuations in the numbers of some bird species, and industrial developments have changed the face of the land to some extent. Footnotes have been supplied by Christopher Moriarty to bring the book up to date in these respects, and a few modern references have been included.

Praeger's descriptions of Carrowkeel have particular archaeological interest. Modern accounts of the site continue to refer to his observations of the passage tombs.

== Editions ==
- 1937: First edition
- 1939: Second edition
- 1947: Third edition
- 1969: Paperbound edition
- 1980: Fifth edition. Dublin: Hodges Figgis. ISBN 0-900372-93-1.
- 1997: Dublin: Collins Press. ISBN 1-898256-35-7.
- 2014: Introduction by Michael Viney. Cork: Collins Press. ISBN 978-1-84889-194-4.

== See also ==
- The Natural History of Ireland by William Thompson (Four volumes, published 1849-1856)
- The Way That I Followed (1990) by Irish naturalist George Francis Mitchell (1912–1997) which built on Praeger's work
- The Way That We Climbed - A History of Irish Hillwalking, Climbing and Mountaineering (2015) by Irish mountaineer Paddy O'Leary
