= William Knowles =

William Knowles is the name of:

- William Standish Knowles (1917–2012), American chemist
- William Erskine Knowles (1872–1951), Canadian Liberal MP (1906–1921)
- William David Knowles (1908–2000), Canadian Progressive Conservative MP (1968–1979)
- William James Knowles (1832–1927), Irish amateur archaeologist
- W. C. G. Knowles (William Charles Goddard Knowles, 1908–1969), British businessman in Hong Kong

== See also ==
- William Knollys, 1st Earl of Banbury (1544–1632), English nobleman at court of Elizabeth I
