= The Irish Naturalist =

- Discipline: biology
- Language: English
- Edited by: George H. Carpenter, Robert Lloyd Praeger

Publication details
- History: 1892–1924
- Frequency: Monthly

Standard abbreviations
- ISO 4: Ir. Nat.

The Irish Naturalist was a scientific journal that was published in Dublin, Ireland, from April 1892 until December 1924.

== History ==
The journal owed its establishment to the efforts of several leading Dublin naturalists, notably George H. Carpenter and R. M. Barrington. The first editors were Carpenter and Robert Lloyd Praeger, of the National Library of Ireland. The journal was supported by a number of societies, including the Royal Zoological Society of Ireland, the Dublin Microscopical Club, the Belfast Naturalists' Field Club, and the Dublin Naturalists' Field Club. The Irish Naturalist was published for 33 years and contained in total over 3000 pages. The journal ceased publication in December 1924. It had been having some financial problems, but the final blow came when Carpenter took up his appointment to the keepership of the Manchester Museum in 1923.

The journal was succeeded in 1925 by the Irish Naturalists' Journal.

== Contributors ==
Among notable contributors to The Irish Naturalist were:

- George James Allman
- Gerald Edwin Hamilton Barrett-Hamilton
- Alfred Cort Haddon
- Maxwell Henry Close
- Annie Massy
- Amy Warren

== See also ==
- Irish Naturalists' Journal, the successor to The Irish Naturalist
