= Jane Stephens =

Irish zoologist, expert on sponges (1879–1959)

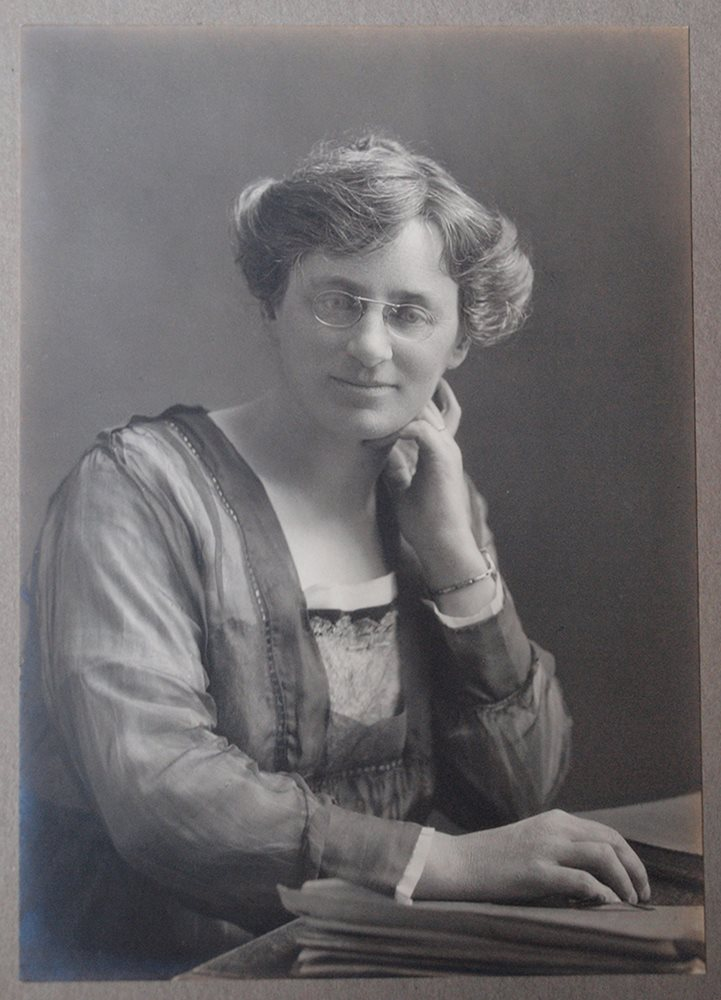
- Stephens c. 1920
- Born: 9 October 1879; Clontarf, Dublin, Ireland
- Died: 11 December 1959 (aged 80); Hospital of St John and St Elizabeth
- Education: Royal College of Science for Ireland
- Known for: Authority on Sponges
- Scientific career
- Fields: Zoology
- Workplaces: National Museum of Ireland

Jane Stephens (9 October 1879 – 11 December 1959) was an Irish zoologist who was considered a leading authority on sponges in Ireland with specialised knowledge in other marine life who identified and named over 40 sponges new to science. From 1905 to 1920 she was employed in the Natural History Division of the National Museum of Ireland working primarily on the collections of marine invertebrates, including taking part in the Clare Island Survey. Robert Lloyd Praeger testified to her knowledge of and work with Irish sponges stating that "Most of what we know of this group, whether marine or fresh-water, in Ireland, or off the Irish coasts, is due to her work."

== Early life and education ==
Stephens was born in Dublin in 1879, the sixth child of Quakers Albert and Jane Stephens. Her elder sister, Laura Stephens, was a talented linguist working as a translator in a government department. She attended Alexandra College excelling in her studies as well as hockey and lawn tennis. She then went on to be the second woman to be awarded a degree (BSc) in the Royal University of Ireland in 1903, receiving second-class honours in geology and biology.

== Professional career ==
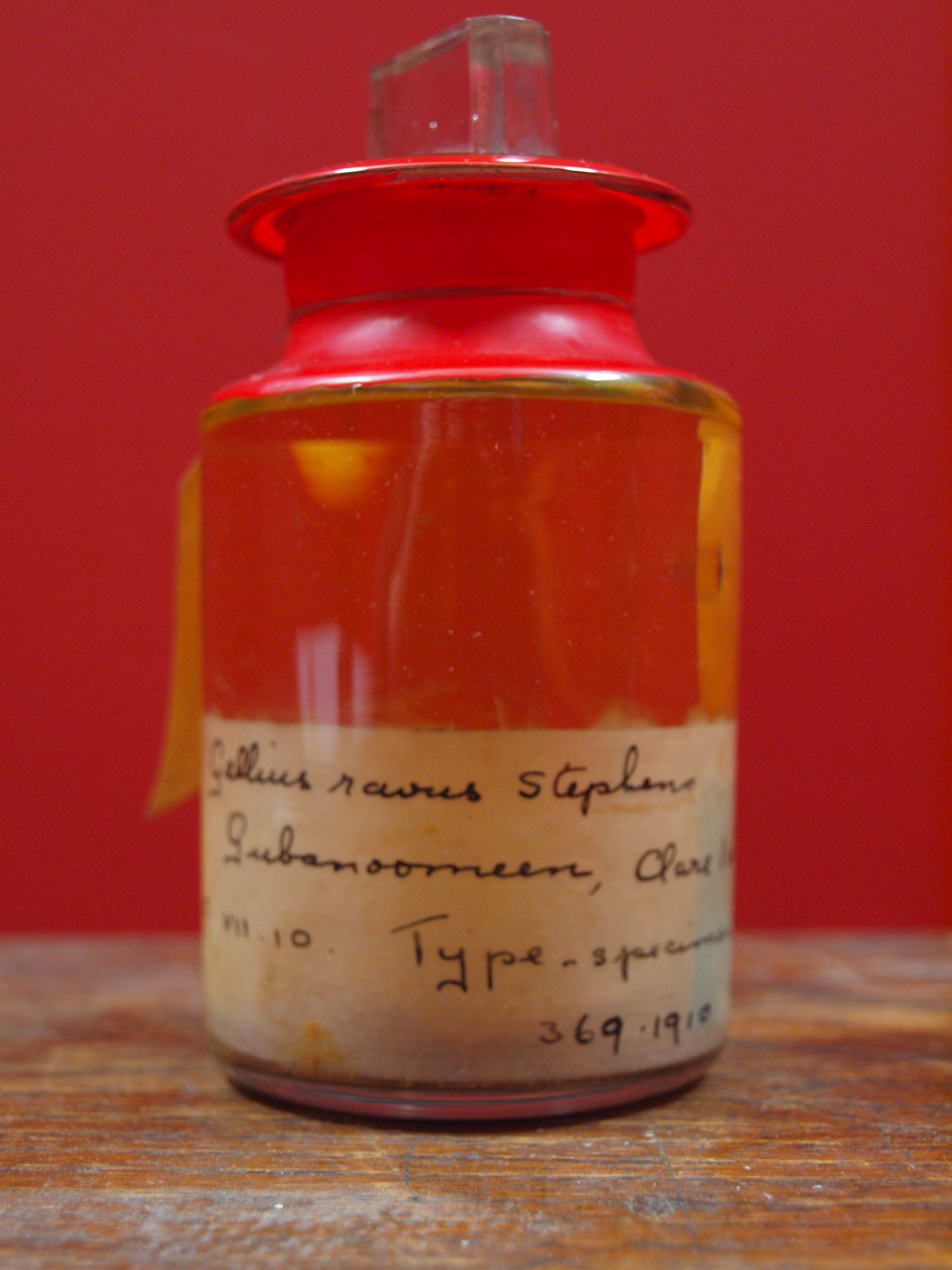
Sponge specimen named and collected by Stephens

She was employed in the Natural History Division of the National Museum of Ireland in 1905, firstly as a Technical Assistant and later as an Assistant Naturalist. Stephens was a specialist in Porifera and Cnidaria. She published many monographs on the collections of the Natural History Museum and novel specimens deposited in the museum from various dredges. She also identified 34 species of sponge new to science from the Scottish National Antarctic Expedition. Stephens took part in the Clare Island Survey in 1909 and 1910, surveying the fresh and marine sponges as well as other marine invertebrates. She worked extensively with her fellow museum worker, Eileen Barnes, an artist who illustrated many of Stephens' publications.

== Later life ==
In 1920 Stephens married Robert Francis Scharff, who was the then acting Director of the National Museum of Ireland and Keeper of the Natural History Division. Due to the marriage bar in Ireland, Stephens had to resign her post in the Museum. Once retired, Stephens appears to have stopped any scientific research, which was not unusual for married women at that time. They had one daughter, Marjorie Patience, born in 1921. Scharff subsequently retired in 1921 and the family moved to Worthing, where Scharff died in 1934. Stephens died in 1959 in London. The lack of an obituary to Stephens has been attributed to the fact that she outlived many of those she worked with during her 15-year career in Ireland, such as Matilda Cullen Knowles, Eileen Barnes and Robert Lloyd Praeger.
