= Francis Balfour-Browne =

English entomologist

William Alexander Francis Balfour-Browne FRSE FZS FLS PRMS (1874–1967), known as Frank, was an English entomologist who specialised in Coleoptera, especially Dytiscidae (diving beetles).

== Life and work ==
Balfour-Browne was born at 16 Ebury Street in London to John Hutton Balfour-Browne KC (d.1921) and Caroline Lush.

He was educated at St Paul's School. As a child he was keenly interested in water beetles, and the group became the subject of his research throughout his life. He studied botany at Magdalen College, Oxford, and was then called to the bar in 1898. He returned to Oxford to study zoology the following year. Beginning in 1906 he taught biology at the Belfast College of the Royal University of Ireland (now known as Queen's University Belfast). In 1913 he became a lecturer in the University of Cambridge.

During the First World War he was a lieutenant in the Royal Army Medical Corps.

He was Professor of Entomology at Imperial College from 1925 to 1930 and was a friend of Robert Lloyd Praeger.

Balfour-Browne was the author of a Text-book of Practical Entomology, British Water Beetles published by the Ray Society, Concerning the Habits of Insects and many scientific papers, mainly on entomology.

Balfour-Browne was a Fellow of the Royal Entomological Society.

He died in Edinburgh on 28 September 1967.

== Family ==
He married in Glasgow on 4 October 1902 Elizabeth Lochhead Carslaw, daughter of Rev. Dr. Carslaw.

His son John Balfour-Browne was also an entomologist, who became a Principal Scientific Officer at the Natural History Museum, London.

== Sources ==
- Angus, R. B. 1967: [Balfour-Browne, W. A. F.] Entomologist's Monthly Magazine (3), London 103:286-288, Portrait
