= George Herbert Carpenter =

British naturalist and entomologist (1865-1939)

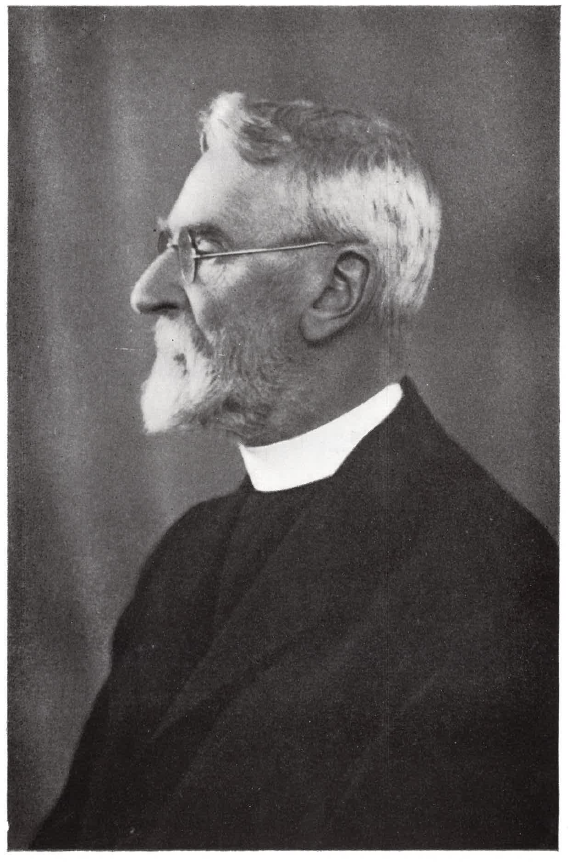
- Born: 1865; Peckham, London
- Died: 1939 (aged 73–74); Belfast, Northern Ireland
- Scientific career
- Fields: Entomology, natural history
- Workplaces: Museum of Science and Art, Dublin

Reverend George Herbert Carpenter (1865–1939) was a British naturalist and entomologist, born in the Peckham district of southeast London in 1865, and died in Belfast on 22 January 1939. His main interests were in the study of insects and arachnids, zoogeography, and economic zoology. In addition to numerous contributions to scientific journals and Encyclopædia Britannica, he authored five books.

== Education and career ==
Carpenter was privately educated as a youth, and studied at King's College London, earning a Bachelor of Science degree at London University and a Doctor of Science degree from Queen's University Belfast.

His first employment as a naturalist was as a clerk in the South Kensington Museum, where he pursued an interest in the natural history of Ireland. In 1888, he took a position in Dublin, Ireland as Assistant Naturalist at the Museum of Science and Art, Dublin, (now the National Museum of Ireland - Natural History) devoting the next 16 years to developing the museum's collections on the natural history of Ireland.

He was active in the Dublin Naturalists' Field Club and in 1892 he co-founded the Irish Naturalist for which he was editor until 1922. He was professor of zoology at the Royal College of Science for Ireland (Dublin) from 1904-1922 when he took up a post as Keeper of Manchester Museum and left Dublin. The Irish Naturalist ceased publication in 1924, and was revived as the Irish Naturalists' Journal. He was a member of the general synod of the Church of Ireland, and was ordained deacon (1926) and priest (1927), where he served at Christ Church, West Didsbury, Manchester (1926–1934), and Saint Augustine's, Broxbourne, Hertfordshire (1935–1937). He is buried in Guildford Cemetery in Surrey.

== Publications ==
Carpenter contributed to a range of scientific journals and to Encyclopædia Britannica, and wrote five books:

- Insects: Their Structure & Life, A Primer of Entomology. London: J. M. Dent, 1899.
- Catalogue of the Fishes of New York (with Tarleton Hoffman Bean). New York State Museum Bulletin No. 60; Zoology, No. 9. Albany: University of the State of New York, 1903.
- The Life-story of Insects. Cambridge: University press, and G. P. Putnam's Sons, 1913.
- Insect Transformation. London: Methuen, 1921.
- The Biology of Insects. New York: The Macmillan Company, 1928.

== Personal ==
Carpenter was a son of George and Phoebe (née Hooper) Carpenter. In 1891, he married Emma Eason of Dublin, with whom he had two sons.

== See also ==
- Category:Taxa named by George Herbert Carpenter
