= Thomas Johnson (botany teacher) =

English botanist (1863–1954)

Thomas Johnson FLS MRIA (27 February 1863 – 9 September 1954) was an English botanist and academic renowned as an expert and cataloguer of the world's algae, fungi, and fossil plants.

== Biography ==
Johnson was born in Barton-upon-Humber, Lincolnshire, in 1863. He attended Elmfield College in Heworth, York and, after additional study, received an appointment in 1890 as Professor of Botany at Ireland's largest institution of higher learning, Catholic University of Ireland which, in 1909, became University College Dublin. In his 36-year tenure in the post he instructed generations of future botanists and other scientists, oversaw the expansion of the National Herbarium and was instrumental in the founding of the first seed testing station for Britain and Ireland. He also supervised and conducted research on economic botany, served on committees charged with advancing scientific learning in Ireland and was a pioneer in the study of phytopathology, the scientific study of plant diseases.

He served as vice president of the Royal Irish Academy. He was made a Fellow of the Linnean Society of London in 1890.

In 1902, Matilda Cullen Knowles was appointed a temporary assistant in the then Botanical Section of the National Science and Art Museum. She worked closely with Johnson to continue the development of the Herbarium collection. She also co-authored with him the Hand List of Irish Flowering Plants and Ferns (1910).

Johnson retired in 1923, allowing Knowles to take over curatorship, despite 'Assistant Keeper' being her job title.

== Personal life ==
Johnson married Bessie Stratton Rowe, daughter of Rev. W. Rowe of Toronto. They had two sons, Lt. Col. Reginald Johnson RAMC (1888–1941) and Capt. Thomas William Gerald Johnson MC (1893–1976), and a daughter, Thirza Mary Patricia Johnson (1894–1955). His eldest son was a physician with the Royal Army Medical Corps and was killed in action in the Second World War, while his younger son was awarded the Military Cross during the First World War for bravery during the Gallipoli Campaign while serving with the 5th (Service) battalion of the Connaught Rangers.

Thomas Johnson died in 1954 in Dublin, and was interred at Deans Grange Cemetery.
