= Nathaniel Colgan =

Irish naturalist (1851–1919)

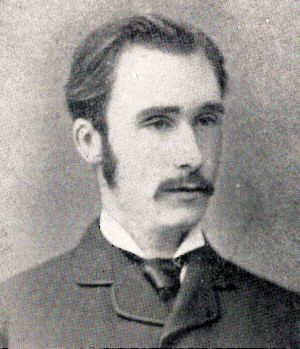
- Born: 28 May 1851; Dublin, Ireland
- Died: 2 October 1919 (aged 68); Dublin
- Known for: identifying the botanical species meant by the term 'shamrock'
- Scientific career
- Fields: Botany

Nathaniel Colgan (1851 Dublin – 1919 Dublin) was a self-taught Irish naturalist primarily known for his botanical work.

== Life ==
Very little is known about Colgan's early life, but it is believed his parents may have been Nathaniel Watson Colgan and Letitia Phair. If correct his father, a pawnbroker, died on 23 January 1863 at Bishop-street, Dublin City and his mother died 26 April 1865, at Rehoboth House, South Circular Road, Dolphin's Barn just prior to Nathaniel's fourteenth birthday. After leaving the Incorporated School, Angier Street, Dublin City, Colgan began work as a clerk and from the age of twenty worked in the Dublin Metropolitan Police Court remaining there until his retirement in 1916.

He began visiting Europe every summer from 1875, and these trips inspired many of the contributions to a magazine of literary manuscripts, Varieties. He was a regular contributor to the magazine from 1873 and edited it for a number of years. Colgan also contributed to Irish Monthly, Tinsley's Magazine and Hibernia. A shy and private person he did develop friendships through his membership of field clubs and an interest in nature, including Charles F. D'Arcy, later Anglican Archbishop of Dublin and Robert Lloyd Praeger.

In 1900, he moved from 1 Belgrave Road in Rathmines to live with his unmarried sisters, Annie and Letitia and a brother, John Joseph, at 15 Breffni Terrace in Sandycove. A married brother was the Rev. William Henry Colgan, Rector of Ballinlough, County Roscommon. Colgan never married and died in Dublin on 2 October 1919.

== Botanical and zoological work ==
Colgan became a keen amateur botanist following his discovery in 1884 of the rare plant saw-wort in Wicklow and was encouraged by Alexander Goodman More to study botany further. He began working on his The Flora of County Dublin in the 1890s but publication was delayed as he and Reginald W. Scully undertook to edit Contributions towards a Cybele Hibernica : being outlines of the geographic distribution of plants in Ireland, founded on the papers of the late Alexander Goodman More following the death of his friend in 1895.

Colgan is noted for his work in identifying the botanical species meant by the term 'shamrock' in the 1890s. He did this by requesting people from around Ireland send him specimens of what they believed to be an Irish shamrock. After tending these specimens until they flowered, Colgan identified the five most common plant species. The most common was lesser trefoil, followed by white clover, red clover, black medic and finally wood sorrel. Dr Charles Nelson repeated the experiment in 1988, marking a hundred years since Colgan's original survey, and found that lesser trefoil was still the most commonly chosen. Lesser trefoil is also the species that is cultivated for sale in Ireland on Saint Patrick's Day and has been nominated by Department of Agriculture as the "official" shamrock of Ireland.

Moving to Sandycove in 1900, Colgan developed an interest in marine invertebrates, particularly Mollusca and tunicates. Colgan recorded the marine Mollusca collected during the Clare Island Survey and his large mollusc collections from County Dublin and Clare Island were subsequently donated to the Natural History Museum Dublin.

Colgan's interest in vernacular and Irish language names for various plants and animals was reflected in his other work into jellyfish, starfish and periwinkles and his contribution to the Clare Island Survey.

== Works ==
Partial list:

- 'The Shamrock: an attempt to fix its species' The Irish Naturalist: a monthly journal of general Irish natural history, Vol. 1, No. 5, 95–97, (August 1892)
- 'The Shamrock: a further attempt to fix its species' The Irish Naturalist: a monthly journal of general Irish natural history, Vol. 2, No. 8, 207–211, (August 1893)
- Flora of the County Dublin. Hodges, Figgis & Co., Dublin (1904)
- 1907 Contributions to a natural history of Lambay: marine Mollusca. Irish Naturalist 16: 33-40 (1907)
- Clare Island Survey: Gaelic plant and animal names, and associated folk-lore. Proceedings of the Royal Irish Academy 31B: 1-30 (1911)
- Clare Island Survey: Marine Mollusca. Proceedings of the Royal Irish Academy 31B: 1-36 (1911)
- The opisthobranch fauna of the shores and shallow waters of County Dublin. Irish Naturalist 23: 161-204 (1914)
- The marine Mollusca of the shores and shallow waters of County Dublin. Proceedings of the Royal Irish Academy 39B: 391-42 (1930)
