= Isaac Swain =

- Born: 1874
- Died: 1963 (aged 88–89)
- Known for: Being a Geologist & Mineralogist
- Scientific career
- Fields: Geology

Isaac Swain (1874 – 1963) was an Irish professor of geology.

== Life ==
Isaac Swain was born in 1874. He was a Quaker. Swain attended the Friends' School, Lisburn, and Royal College of Science for Ireland, graduating with a BA and MSc. He was a demonstrator in geology at the Royal College from 1906 to 1910.

Swain was a member of the Royal Irish Academy and oversaw the geological elements of the Clare Island Survey from 1909 to 1911. He was professor of geology and geography in University College Cork from 1909 to 1944, with no additional staff. He published relatively few papers.

He died in 1963.
