= Charles J. Patten =

Irish anatomy professor and ornithologist

Charles Joseph Patten
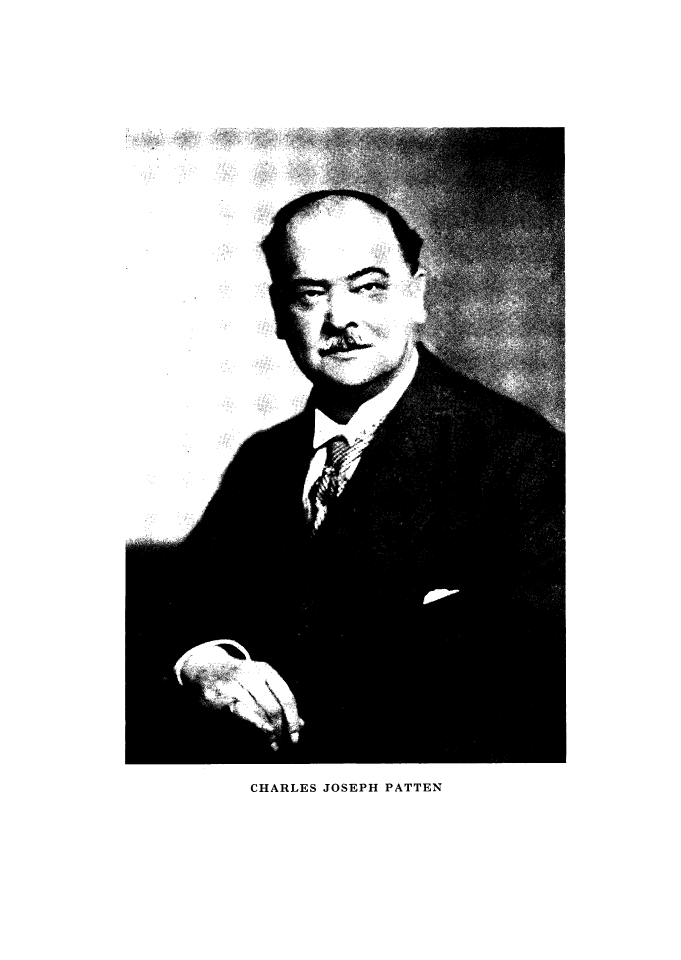
- Born: 1870; Ballybrack, Dublin, Ireland
- Died: 13 June 1948 (aged 78); Farnham, Surrey, UK
- Citizenship: Irish
- Education: Trinity College, Dublin
- Known for: Ornithology
- Scientific career
- Fields: Anatomy, Ornithology
- Workplaces: Trinity College, Dublin, University of Sheffield

Charles Joseph Patten MA MD Sc.D. FRAI (1870 – 13 June 1948) was an Irish anatomist and ornithologist.

== Biography ==
Charles Joseph Patten was born in 1870, in Ballybrack, County Dublin. He was a son of Richard Patten, of the Court of Exchequer. He was educated at The High School, Dublin. He studied biology and medicine at Trinity College and graduated in 1896. After that, he joined the staff of Daniel John Cunningham at Trinity College as demonstrator of anatomy. In 1901 he became professor of anatomy at the University College of Sheffield, as the successor of Christopher Addison.

When he left Dublin that was observed as a loss for Irish ornithology: W.F. de Vismes Kane, the President of the Dublin Naturalists' Field Club, in his Presidential Address of January 1902, said: Patten's "appointment to the Chair of Anatomy at Sheffield deprives us of one of our most promising members."

After Sheffield got its independent university, in 1905, Patten got in charge of the new department of anatomy. He retired in 1935, then becoming professor emeritus. He continued to live in Sheffield. The last years of his life he lived in Farnham, Surrey. He died after a very brief illness on 13 June 1948, at his home.

== Ornithologist ==
Charles J. Patten was perhaps better known as an ornithologist than as an anatomist. "He had an extraordinary affection for birds, and an unusual knowledge of their ways." He published books and articles on birds, both popular and scientific. He observed birds as a naturalist, rather than as an anatomist, and was interested in their habits, their nesting, and their migration. In 1906 he first published The Aquatic Birds of Great Britain, which became a standard work.

In 1916 Patten identified a new bird species for Ireland: a "black-eared wheatear"; the species would nowadays be called western black-eared wheatear (Oenanthe hispanica). The species was obtained on Tuskar Rock, County Wexford, on 16 May, by Mr. Glanville, the principal lightkeeper, and was sent in the flesh for identification to Patten, who announced the new species on the Irish list in Nature.

== Bibliography ==
- Patten, Charles J. (1900). "Note on the Configuration of the Heart in Man and some other Mammalian Groups". Journal of Anatomy and Physiology. 35 (Pt. 1): 71–82.5. doi:10.1007/BF03045169. PMC 1287281. PMID 17232458.

Read before the Section of Anatomy and Physiology of the Royal Academy of Medicine in Ireland, June 1, 1900, and before the Anatomical Society of Great Britain and Ireland, at Manchester, June 22, 1900

- —— (1906). The Aquatic Birds of Great Britain and Ireland. London: R.H. Porter, 1906. OCLC 727162717.
- —— (1909). "External Features of an Early Human Embryo with a Distended Amnion". Journal of Anatomy and Physiology. 43 (Pt 3): 235–241. PMC 1289183. PMID 17232803.
- —— (1911a). "Cranium of a Young Orang, showing Bilateral and Symmetrical Complete Bipartite Division of the Parietals". Journal of Anatomy and Physiology. 46 (Pt 1): 28–32. PMC 1288893. PMID 17232907.
- —— (1911b). "Cranium of a Chimpanzee, showing Metopic Suture; also Fontanelle and Sutural Bone-Plates". Journal of Anatomy and Physiology. 46 (Pt 1): 33–35. PMC 1288894. PMID 17232908.
- —— (15 June 1916). "The Black-eared Wheatear: A New Bird for the Irish List". Nature. 97 (2433): 321–322. doi:10.1038/097321d0. S2CID 3980659.
- The story of the birds – a guide to the study of avian structure and habits, published in 1928, Pawson & Brailsford Limited, Simpkin Marshall, Limited (Sheffield, London) (founded on a series of broadcast addresses delivered to schools in Sheffield) where he was professor of anatomy; and over 80 scientific papers on Irish birds.

== Sources ==
- An (26 June 1948). "Obituary: C.J. Patten, M.D. Sc.D.". British Medical Journal. 1 (4564): 1262. doi:10.1136/bmj.1.4564.1262. S2CID 220024193.
- MacConaill, M.A. (April 1949). "In memoriam: Charles Joseph Patten, M.A., M.D., Sc.D., F.R.A.I." Journal of Anatomy. 83 (Pt. 2): 178–178.1. PMC 1273158. (with photo)
- Stendall, J.A.S. 1949 Charles Joseph Patten 1870–1949. Irish Naturalists' Journal 9: 265
