= Grosvenor Square, Dublin =

Victorian garden square in Dublin, Ireland

Grosvenor Square
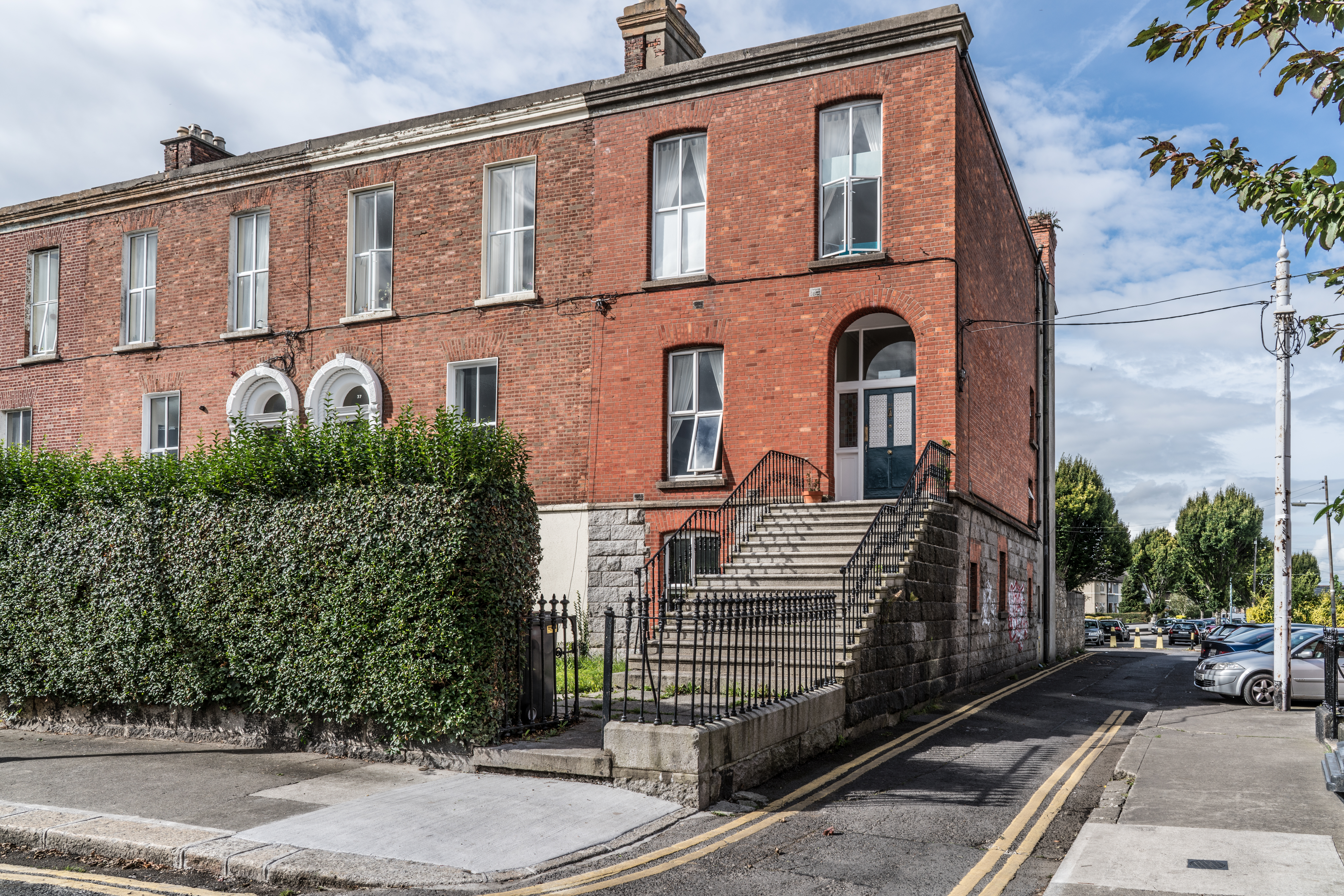
- Grosvenor Square in April 2018

- Location within Dublin
- Native name: Cearnóg Grosvenor (Irish)
- Namesake: Grosvenor Square, London (named after Sir Richard Grosvenor, 4th Baronet)
- Area: 1.5 hectares (3.7 acres)
- Location: Rathmines, Dublin, Ireland
- Postal code: D06
- Coordinates: 53.3243°N 6.2736°W

Other
- Status: Protected Structures (RPS 3343 - 3422)

Grosvenor Square (/ˈɡroʊvənər/ GROH-vən-ər, Irish: Cearnóg Grosvenor) is a Victorian square located in the inner suburb of Rathmines on the Southside of Dublin. While construction of the houses commenced in the late 1850s, it continued on a piecemeal basis for the next four decades. The square was finally completed in the beginning of the 20th century.

The housing on the square is generally more modest in size and design than the nearby Kenilworth Square. Located in the central green of the square are Kenilworth Bowling Club and Stratford Lawn Tennis Club. Leinster Cricket Club originally played matches in the square before moving to Observatory Lane in 1865. Grosvenor Park, Grosvenor Lane, Grosvenor Place and Grosvenor Road are also located near the square in both Rathmines and nearby Rathgar.

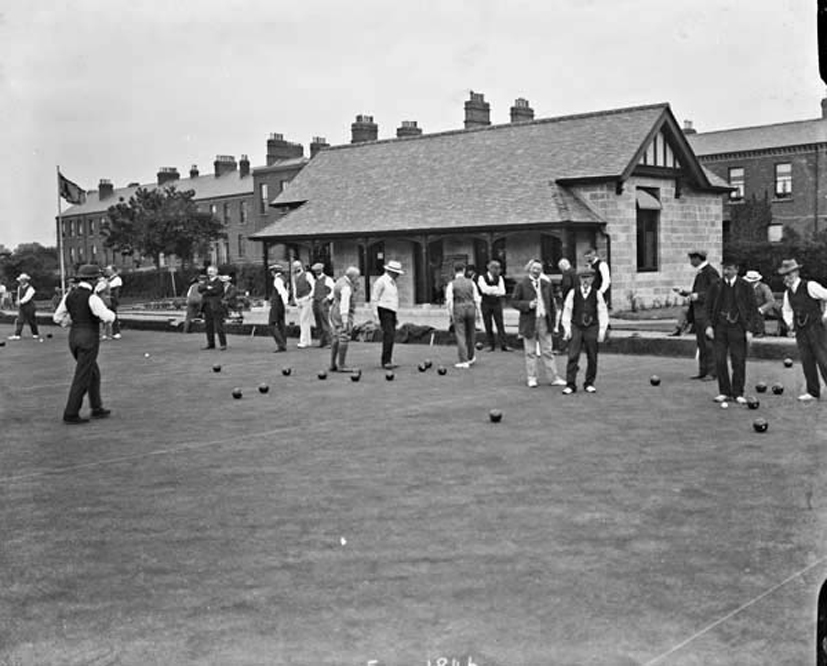
Kenilworth Bowling Club players at its Grosvenor Square clubhouse in 1920

== Notable residents ==
- Albert Russell Nichols
- Ella Young
- Rex Ingram (director)
