= Lilian E. Porter =

Irish botanist and lichenologist (1885–1972)

- Born: Lilian E. Baker; 21 September 1885; Airdrie, Lanarkshire, Scotland
- Died: 1972 (aged 87)
- Education: University of Liverpool, 1911
- Known for: The Lichens of Ireland (Supplement) (1948)
- Spouse: William Holt Porter (m. 1915; died 1961)
- Children: 3
- Scientific career
- Fields: Botany; lichenology; mycology
- Workplaces: University College of North Wales; University College Cork; National University of Ireland
- Author abbrev. (botany): L. Porter

Lilian E. Porter (née Baker; 21 September 1885 – 1972 (Note: Also cited as c. 1966 and 1973.)) was an Irish (Note: Also cited as British.) botanist, lichenologist, mycologist and lecturer. A contributor to the lichen collection at University College Cork, Porter is known for her 1948 supplement to Matilda Cullen Knowles' 1929 work "The Lichens of Ireland".

== Biography ==
Lilian E. Baker was born on 21 September 1885 in Airdrie, Lanarkshire. (Note: Porter is cited as being the daughter of the botanist John Gilbert Baker however, Baker only had one daughter Katherine Unthank Baker (died 1918).) In 1911 (Note: Also cited as 1909.), Porter graduated from the University of Liverpool with a M.S. in botany.

Between 1913 and 1916, Porter was a lecturer in botany at University College of North Wales. Settling in Cork, Porter worked as a lecturer in biology at the University College Cork from 1916 to 1919. From 1921 to 1945, Porter worked for the National University of Ireland as an assistant examiner for the botany matriculation exam.

Whilst her husband, William Holt Porter, was as a professor of ancient history at University College Cork, Porter researched and contributed to the university's lichen collection. On 10 February 1947, Porter presented to the Royal Irish Academy a supplement to Matilda Cullen Knowles' 1929 work "The Lichens of Ireland". Porter's supplement was published the following year. Research from Porter's supplement was included in the 1953 work Census catalogue of British lichens by Walter Watson.

== Personal life ==
In 1915, Porter married William Holt Porter, a professor of ancient history, in Caernarfonshire. The couple had three children.

In Cork, Porter lived at Lehenagh House in Togher. Following her husband's retirement in 1951, the couple moved to Dublin.

Porter died in 1972, aged 87. A cenotaph to Porter, her husband and other members of the Porter family stands at Mount Jerome Cemetery and Crematorium.

== Publications ==
- Porter, Lilian (1917–1919). "On the Attachment Organs of the Common Corticolous Ramalinae". Proceedings of the Royal Irish Academy. Section B: Biological, Geological, and Chemical Science. 34: 17–32.
- Porter, Lilian (1917–1919). "On the Attachment Organs of Some Common Parmeliae". Proceedings of the Royal Irish Academy. Section B: Biological, Geological, and Chemical Science. 34: 205–211.
- Porter, Lilian (April 1922). "Lichens on Veronica Traversii". The Irish Naturalists' Journal. 31 (4): 48.
- Porter, Lilian (July 1936). "Some Lichen Records". The Irish Naturalists' Journal. 6 (4): 92–94.
- Porter, Lilian (1945–1948). "The Lichens of Ireland (Supplement)". Proceedings of the Royal Irish Academy. Section B: Biological, Geological, and Chemical Science. 51: 347–386.
- Porter, Lilian (January 1955). "Lichen-Hunting in Wexford and Carlow". The Irish Naturalists' Journal. 11 (9): 252–253.
