= Henry William Lett =

Irish botanist (1836–1920)

- Born: 4 December 1836; Hillsborough, County Down, Ireland
- Died: 26 December 1920 (aged 84); Aghaderg, County Down
- Occupation: botany

Henry William Lett (4 December 1836 in Hillsborough, County Down – 26 December 1920 in Aghaderg) was an Irish botanist who specialised in mosses.

== Early life and family ==
Lett was born in Hillsborough, County Down on 4 December 1836, the second of four children. His father, Charles Lett (1804/5-1887), was also a Church of Ireland clergyman. His mother was Elizabeth Mary (née Corry). Lett spent most of his life living within 30 miles of his birthplace. Lett was educated at Trinity College and was ordained in 1871. He was Canon of Dromore.

Lett married Louisa Tandy in 1865. The couple had 5 children.

== Botanical career ==
Lett was a member of the Belfast Natural History Society from 1878, and was elected a Member of the Royal Irish Academy in 1896. He published his first paper in 1881. He studied primarily cryptogamic plants, including fungi, mosses, liverworts, lichens and algae, which he collected and studied throughout his life. Lett also studied brambles, vascular plants, and other flowering plants. In 1896, he assisted Reverend Cosslett Herbert Waddell in the foundation of the Moss Exchange Club (later the British Bryological Society) and acted as a referee in 1909. He took part in the Clare Island Survey, studying the mosses. Rubus lettii is named in his honour.

Lett died in Aghaderg on 26 December 1920.

Specimens from his collection are held in the Ulster Museum, the National Botanic Gardens in Dublin, and the Liverpool Museum. The Botanic Gardens hold his bryophyte herbarium with approximately 15,000 specimens, primarily from Ireland.

== Significant works ==
- Lett, H. W. 1912. Musci and Hepaticae. Clare Island Survey, parts 11, 1Z: Proc. Roy. Irish Acad., 13, 1–18.
- Lett, H. W. 1915. Census Report on the Mosses of Ireland. Proc. Roy. Irish Acad., 32, B, 65–166.
