= Christ Church, West Didsbury =

- The Parish Church of Christ, West Didsbury, Manchester
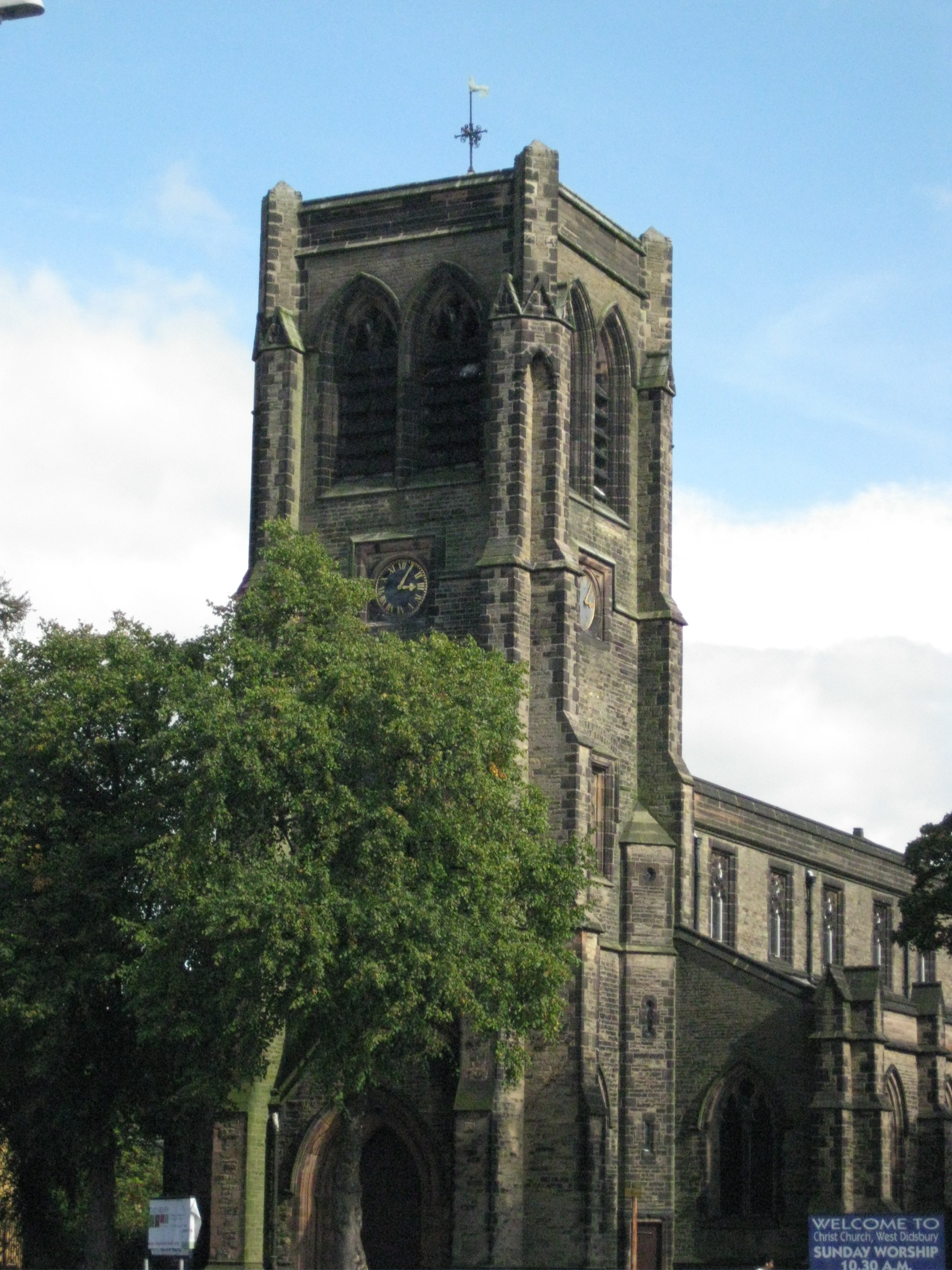

- Location in Greater Manchester
- 53.4235°N 2.2567°W
- OS grid reference: SJ 83040 91883
- Location: West Didsbury, Manchester
- Country: England
- Denomination: Church of England

History
- Founder: Mr. William Roberts
- Dedication: Christ
- Consecrated: 6 August 1882

Architecture
- Heritage designation: Grade II
- Years built: 1878 - 1882

Specifications
- Capacity: 350
- Materials: Sandstone & Brick

Administration
- Province: York
- Diocese: Manchester
- Archdeaconry: Manchester
- Deanery: Withington
- Parish: West Didsbury & Withington

Clergy
- Rector: The Revd Anne Pilkington

Christ Church, West Didsbury is the Parish Church of West Didsbury and part of Withington in Manchester. The parish is home to almost 18,000 people.

It is notable in part as it is one of the most passed churches in Manchester as it is on the entry to Manchester on the A5013 (Princess Parkway).

== History ==
The Church was built in 1881 as a gift to the community from Mr. William Roberts of Darleydale and cost £13,000. The architect was Henry Littler. It was, for many years, known as 'Christ Church-in-the-fields' due to its placement in a semi-rural setting; it is now in a suburban area.

Between 1979 and 1981 the church was closed due to major extension of Princess Parkway and during this time the church was completely reordered and redecorated. The west entrance was sealed off and a new east entrance was created into what was the organ chamber. The old Jardine organ was disposed of and a redundant organ was purchased and rebuilt in a new case at the west end.

In December 2006 Christ Church joined forces with St. Christopher's Church in Withington and became a single parish. The current Rector is Anne Pilkington who came to the church from William Temple Church in Wythenshawe.

== Concert venue and organ ==
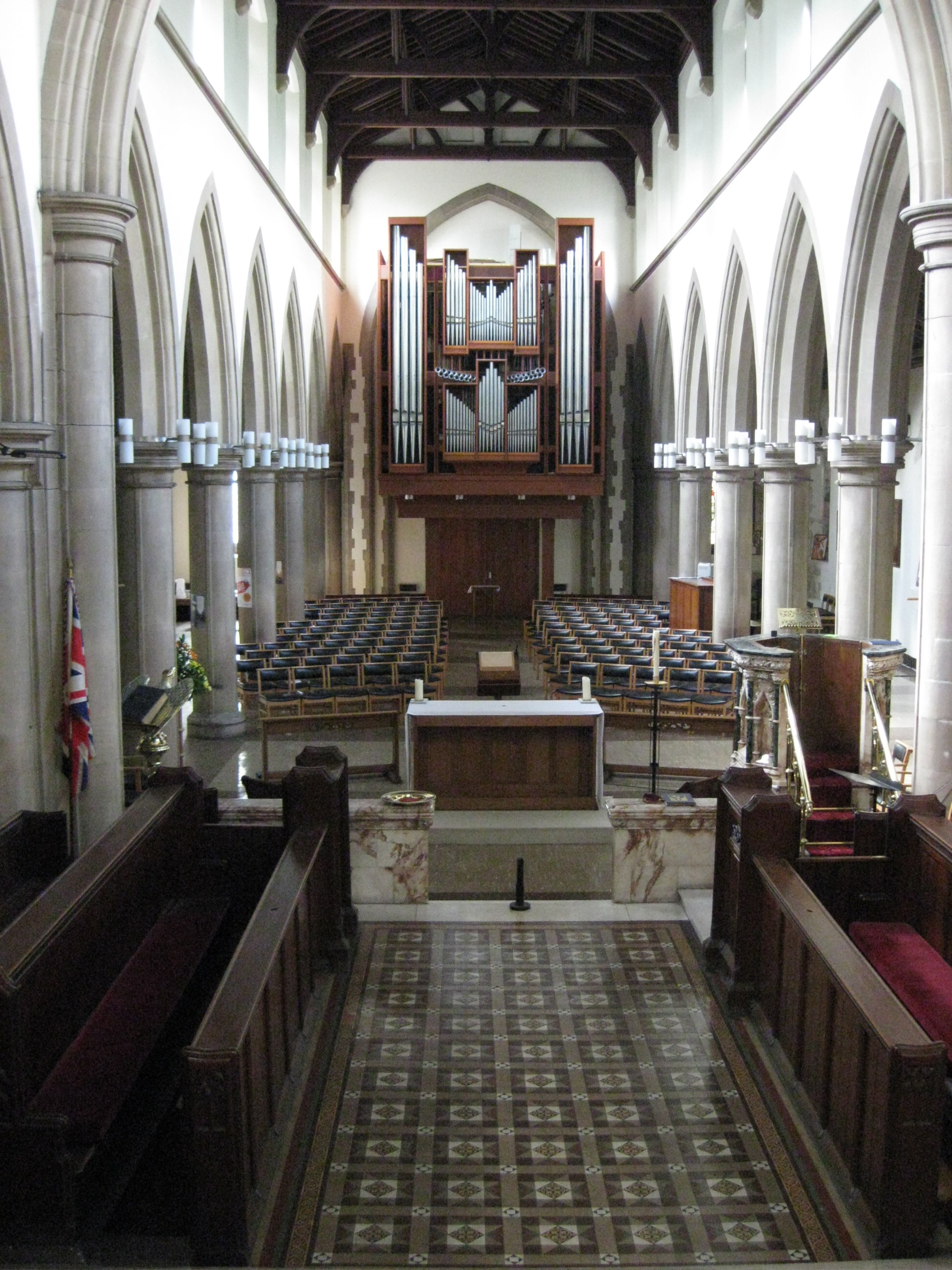
Looking west from the quire

Christ Church is a venue for concerts due to its excellent acoustics (especially for chamber music) and flexible interior. It is the regular 'home' of the Manchester Chamber Choir and The William Byrd Singers of Manchester.

The church has a pipe organ of 42 speaking stops based on by JJ Binns of Leeds. It was brought to Christ Church in 1981 and rebuilt and enlarged in a new case at the West end. More recently (2013), the organ has been rebuilt by A. J. Carter of Wakefield. Changes included new digital combination and transmission systems along with repairs to the wind system. There is also a 2-manual Viscount Physis organ in the chancel which is used for choral accompaniment and can also operate the west-end organ via a midi link.
