= Kenilworth Square =

Victorian square in Dublin, Ireland

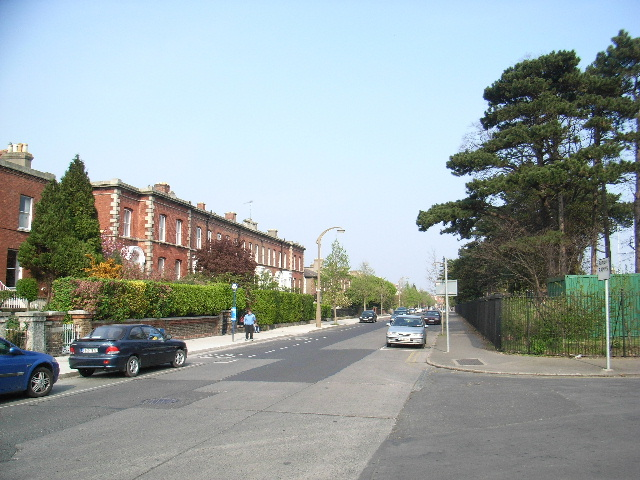
- A vista along North Kenilworth Square
- Interactive map of Kenilworth Square
- Native name: Cearnóg Kenilworth (Irish)
- Namesake: Kenilworth (novel)
- Owner: Houses (Private)
- Area: 3.0 hectares (7.4 acres)
- Location: Rathmines, Dublin, Ireland
- Postal code: D06
- Coordinates: 53°19′6″N 6°16′33.16″W

Kenilworth Square is a Victorian square in the Rathgar area of Dublin 6, Ireland. It was developed by several different developers between 1858 and 1879. The houses are in a variety of different Victorian styles although all are finished in red brick.

== History ==
The Ordnance Survey map of 1867 shows that most plots surrounding the square had already been laid out and built upon at that stage. Development of the surrounding area had begun initially after the establishment of the township of Rathgar and Rathmines in 1847.

The square is named for the romantic novel Kenilworth by Walter Scott.

Many of the large houses on the square were developed in the 1860s.

St Mary's College privately own the green area inside the square which they acquired in 1947 from a property developer named Mr White. The developer had originally acquired the interest of a majority of home owners in the square.

This area contains three rugby pitches which is converted to a cricket pitch in the summer months as well as some changing rooms.

Kenilworth bowling club was established in the square in 1892 in the back garden of Charles Eason, founder of Eason & Son at 29 and 30 Kenilworth Square. The club acquired a 25-year lease on nearby Grosvenor Square in 1909 and have remained there ever since despite retaining the Kenilworth name.

=== 1999 Private key access ===
In 1999, Judge John O'Hagan ruled that a group of residents were not entitled to a permanent right of way or access to a private key for the park based on previous licence agreements with owners stretching back to 1860 as there was no current contractual agreement in place.

=== 2024 Redevelopment plans ===
In 2024, St Mary's College revealed plans to redevelop the square, removing one of the pitches to create two larger pitches on the square with one being an all weather rugby pitch. They also planned to demolish the existing changing rooms and construct a new larger set of changing rooms as well as modern floodlights and a carpark within the previous grass area of the square. Locals, conservationists and environmentalists have raised concerns about the impact to the environment and community as well as the proposed commercialisation of the square.

In February 2026, residents of Kenilworth square and the surrounding area failed in a bid to overturn an exemption of planning permission granted by Dublin City Council for the erection of fencing and replacement of the grass within the park with an astroturf surface.

== Notable residents ==
- William Evelyn Wylie, judge, military officer and administrator was born at Kenilworth House (likely number 3 Kenilworth Square).
- Thomas Pile, Lord Mayor of Dublin, lived at Kenilworth House (likely number 3 Kenilworth Square).
- Pádraig MacKernan, diplomat, lived at number 22.
- Percy Oswald Reeves, artist, lodged at number 25.
- Frederick Eason, founder of Eason & Son, lived at number 30.
- Ludwig Hopf, German-Jewish theoretical physicist, lived at number 65.
