= Matilda Cullen Knowles =

Irish botanist

- portrait
- Born: 31 January 1864; Ballymena, Ireland
- Died: 27 April 1933 (aged 69); Dublin, Ireland
- Education: Royal College of Science for Ireland
- Known for: Formative study of Irish lichens
- Scientific career
- Fields: Lichenology
- Workplaces: National Museum of Ireland
- Author abbrev. (botany): M.Knowles

Matilda Cullen Knowles (31 January 1864 – 27 April 1933) is considered the founder of modern studies of Irish lichens following her work in the early twentieth century on the multi-disciplinary Clare Island Survey. From 1923 she shared curatorship of the National Museum of Ireland herbarium – a collection of dried and pressed plants now housed at the National Botanic Gardens. Her work is said to have "formed an important baseline contribution to the cryptogamic botany of Ireland and western oceanic Europe".

== Early life and education ==
Knowles was born in Cullybackey near Ballymena, Northern Ireland, in 1864. Her early interest in botany was encouraged by her father, William James Knowles, himself an amateur scientist who would take Matilda and her sister to meetings of the Belfast Naturalists field club. This is where she first met Robert Lloyd Praeger, who continued to be a lifelong influence. In 1895 she was introduced to the Derry botanist Mary Leebody and together they worked on a supplement to Samuel Stewart and T.H.Corey's 1888 book the Flora of the North-east of Ireland. T.H.Corey was credited posthumously as he had died on an expedition in Ireland.

She then volunteered to help with the crowd sourcing of material about the plants of Tyrone County. Whilst completing this work Knowles published her own first paper about Tyrone's flowering plants in 1897. Knowles eventually sent in over 500 examples that were considered for inclusion in the Irish Topographical Botany, which Praeger published in 1901.

Knowles and her sister, Catherine, then attended the Royal College of Science for Ireland for a year, where she took natural science classes some time between 1896 and 1900.

In 1902, Knowles was appointed a temporary assistant in the then Botanical Section of the National Science and Art Museum. She worked closely with Professor Thomas Johnson to continue the development of the Herbarium collection. She also co-authored with him the Hand List of Irish Flowering Plants and Ferns (1910).

== Professional career ==
=== Clare Island Survey ===
One of Knowles' first works was The Maritime and Marine Lichens of Howth, which the Royal Dublin Society published in 1913. Knowles had gathered the knowledge and experience to do this whilst diligently assisting with a survey of Clare Island as suggested by Robert Lloyd Praeger. The 1910–1911 survey looked at dozens of different aspects of the small island just outside Clew Bay in Ireland. This novel survey involved not only Irish but also several European scientists including prominent UK lichenologist, Annie Lorrain Smith. This was claimed as the most extensive piece of field work at that time. As a result, Knowles was able to create a foundation for her later specialism in lichens.

=== Lichens monographs and specialism ===
Knowles published more than thirty scientific papers on a wide range of botanical subjects between 1897 and 1933. It was while studying the lichens of Howth that she discovered how lichens by the shore grow in distinct tidal zones that can be distinguished by their colour: black, orange and grey.

Her major work was The Lichens of Ireland, which added over 100 species of Lichen to the Irish List and recorded the distribution of the eight hundred species identified in Ireland, was suggested by Praeger. She achieved this task with the collaboration of thirty other natural scientists. It was published in 1929 and included twenty lichens that has previously not been identified as Irish.

On 10 February 1947, Lilian E. Porter presented a supplement to Knowles' The Lichens of Ireland to the Royal Irish Academy. Porter's supplement was published the following year.

== Later life ==
Professor Thomas Johnson retired in 1923, allowing Knowles to take over curatorship, working with Margaret Buchanan. As she became older, Knowles' hearing began to fail such that she had to rely on an ear trumpet. Despite her deafness she would still attend meetings but she would signal when she thought that had been sufficient talk by putting down her hearing device. Knowles cared for and added to the National Museum Herbarium collection although never got the credit she deserved. In 1923 she planned to retire but pneumonia ended her life before she ended her career. Knowles died in Dublin on 27 April 1933.

== Recognition ==
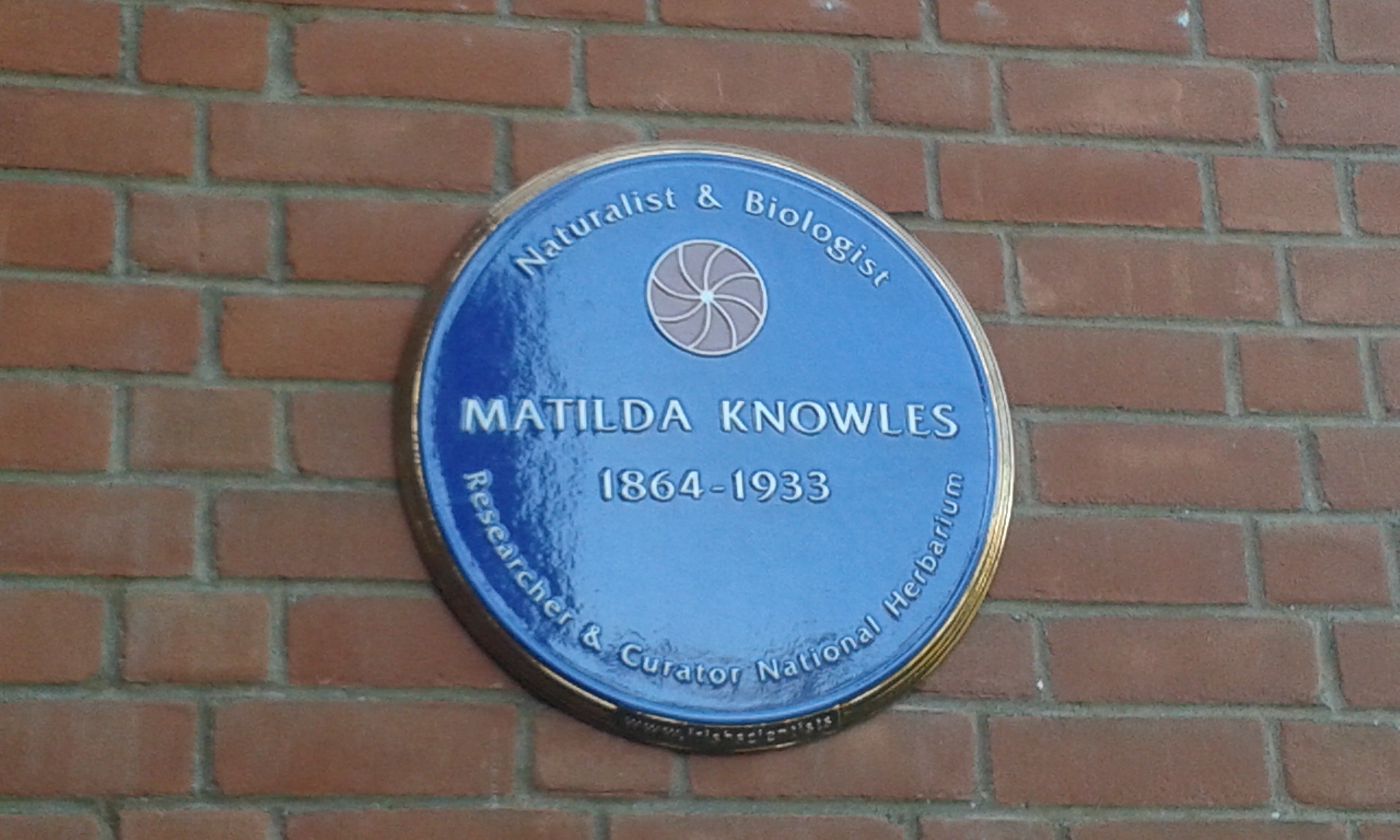
Plaque in the National Botanic Gardens of Ireland

Knowles was honoured with a commemorative plaque, awarded by the Irish National Committee for Science and Engineering plaques, in October 2014 to mark 150 years since her birth.

== List of publications ==
- Knowles MC. (1897). "Flowering Plants of County Tyrone". Irish Naturalist. 6: 83–84.
- National Museum of Ireland (1910). Knowles MC. (ed.). Hand List of Irish Flowering Plants and Ferns. H.M. Stationery Office.
- Knowles MC. (1914). "Maritime and Marine Lichens of Howth Head, Ireland". The Journal of Ecology. 2 (2): 134–138. doi:10.2307/2255596. JSTOR 2255596.
- Knowles MC. (1913). The Maritime and Marine Lichens of Howth. Royal Dublin Society.
- Smith AL, Knowles MC. (1926). "Lichens of the Dublin Foray". Transactions of the British Mycological Society. 11 (1–2): 18–22. doi:10.1016/s0007-1536(26)80021-x.
- Knowles MC. (1929). The lichens of Ireland. Hodges, Figgis.

== Eponymous taxa ==
Several lichen species have been named in honour of Knowles, including:

- Lecidea matildae H.Magn. (1956)
- Pestalotia matildae Richatt (1953)
- Verrucaria knowlesiae P.M.McCarthy (1988)

However, *Acarospora knowlesii C.W.Dodge (1968) is named for geologist Paul H. Knowles of the U.S. Antarctic service, who collected the type specimen in 1940 (note the masculine ending), and *Meliola knowltoniae Doidge (1924) and *Septoria knowltoniae Verwoerd & Dippen. (1930) are so called because they were described from specimens found growing on the South African plant Knowltonia vesicatoria.
