= William James Knowles =

Irish amateur archeologist

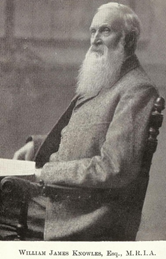
- Born: 29 January 1832; Fenagh, near Cullybackey, County Antrim, Ireland
- Died: 5 May 1927 (aged 95); Ballycastle, County Antrim, Ireland
- Relatives: Matilda Cullen Knowles (daughter)

William James Knowles (29 January 1832 – 5 July 1927) was an Irish amateur archaeologist.

== Life ==
William James Knowles was born in Fenagh, near Cullybackey, County Antrim on 29 January 1832. His parents were Jane (née Ewart) and James Knowles. He was their eldest son. Knowles was educated privately, and was employed as a land agent in Ballymena on the Casement estate. He also served as high constable of the barony of Lower Toome from 1887 to 1899 and was secretary of a local investment company. He gave evening classes on science and agriculture as a young man in Cullybackey, Portglenone, and Ballymena. In 1873 he founded the Ballymena Naturalists' Field Club, and in 1875 the Ballymena Archaeological Society. He married Margaret Spotswood Cullen, and they had three daughters and two sons.

Knowles dedicated all his spare time to archaeology, and was one of the first people to excavate in the sandhills of the Ulster coast. At Portstewart, County Londonderry and elsewhere, he uncovered important Neolithic and mesolithic sites. At Tievebulliagh, near Cushendun he excavated the a Neolithic axe factory which was the source of porcellanite axes found all over Ireland and Great Britain. He pioneered the study of Neolithic flint implements in Ulster, resulting in a large personal collection of artefacts. Unlike many of his contemporaries, Knowles carefully excavated and documented his finds. Later archaeologists used his classification of axe-types for analysis of morphology and function. He served as secretary to the committee established by the British Association for the Advancement of Science in 1878 to excavate sandhill sites, and which later published a report on their activity.

In 1883 he was elected a member of the Royal Irish Academy. He was a fellow of the Royal Society of Antiquaries of Ireland and the Royal Anthropological Institute. He published widely, with more than 70 papers, illustrated by his daughters Margaret and Matilda, between 1877 and 1907. In 1924, Knowles retired and auctioned his collection of over 50,000 archaeological and geological specimens at Sotheby's. He died on 5 July 1927, and is buried at the Craigs, near Cullybackey.

The Ulster Museum holds a portrait of Knowles by his daughter, Margaret.
