= Stagdale Lodge =

Stagdale Lodge was an ancestral home, on the border of the counties of Limerick and Tipperary, Ireland in the Glen of Aherlow. It was located in the Townland of Lissanarroor, Civil Parish of Galbally, County Limerick.

It was the home of the Massy, a Protestant ascendancy family, who occupied it from the late 18th century onwards. The first Massy occupant was Lord Massy, 1st Baron of Duntrileague who died there on 30 January 1788.

In 1830, the land around the house was valued at thirty-six pounds. In 1837, it was described as having a "fine avenue of stately beech trees". This was repeated in 1932 with "an exceptionally fine avenue lined with beeches, centuries old and so tall that the rooks on their branches seem cawing into another region". William Massy was still resident at the time of Griffith's Valuation holding the property from Hugh Massy. In 1906 occupied by Hugh H.G. Massy and valued at £30.10 shillings.

The building no longer exists but the area surrounding where it once stood still bears the name Stagdale.
