= George Philip Farran =

Irish zoologist

George Philip Farran (1876–1949) was an Irish zoologist. He was an expert on Copepoda.

Farran initially worked in the National Museum and in the Royal Dublin Society's Fishery Survey. He was appointed Assistant Naturalist with the Fisheries Branch of the Department of Agriculture and Technical Instruction for Ireland in 1901, and became an Inspector in 1909 and in 1938 Chief Inspector.

== Personal life and education ==
He was born on 21 November 1876 at Templeogue, the son of Edmond Chomley Farran and his wife Anne Hume Ryan; his father, who was independently wealthy, died in 1881. He attended the school at Rathmines run by Charles William Benson, an enthusiast for natural history, and entered the Trinity College, Dublin, law school in 1895. Later he graduated in Natural Science winning the Gold Medal of the subject for his class.

Farran's studies of marine wildlife began at the Marine Laboratory in Ballynakill with a small group of scientists gathered by Ernest William Lyons Holt, in 1898. It focused on marine biological issues of the fishery. Farran joined the Department of Agriculture and Technical Instruction in 1900. He became Inspector of Fisheries in 1910, when Holt was promoted.

During World War I, Farran served in the King's (Liverpool) Regiment. He was in Egypt and Palestine, and left the army in 1919. In 1920 he married Georgina Margaret Craig, and they had a son and a daughter.

In 1938 Farran was promoted to Chief Inspector of Fisheries. He continued his work with the Department until his retirement in 1946.

== Studies ==
Farran's work was first based on a broad range of marine zoology: it was later in his career that he began his work on planktonic organisms for which he is best known. He specifically studied copepods, which are aquatic crustaceans.

Farran was brought material from around the world by other scientists. He was widely published scientist, with work published journals, including those of the Royal Irish Academy and Linnean Society of London, Exploration of the Sea, and by the Zoological Society. Most of his work was published in the Scientific Investigations of the Fisheries Branch of the Department of Agriculture and Technical Instruction for Ireland.

When he began nearing the end of his career his work was more focused on the administrative side of his job rather than the scientific work he preferred. Farran did still manage to continue his work with planktonic organisms throughout the remainder of his life even close to his death on January 5, 1949, at the age of 72. Farran still studied after his retirement, and even participated in an experiment of breeding of oysters in tanks at Cromane in 1947 and 1948 just before he died.

== Works ==
- Farran, G.P. 1905. Report on the opisthobranchiate Mollusca collected by Professor Herdman, at Ceylon, in 1902. pp. 329–364 in: Report to the government of Ceylon on the pearl oyster fisheries of the Gulf of Manaar 3, Suppl. Rept. No. 21 (W.A. Herdman, ed.). Royal Society, London.
- Farran, G.P. 1908. Second report on the Copepoda of the Irish Atlantic slope. Rep. Sea inland fish. Irel. Sci. Invest. 1906. Pt. (1908): 19-120.
- Farran, G.P. 1913. The deep-water Asteroidea, Ophiuroidea and Echinoidea of the West Coast of Ireland. Department of Agriculture and technical instruction for Ireland, fisheries branch, scientific investigations 1912, 6, 1-66.
- Farran, G.P. 1926. Biscayan plankton collected during a cruise of H.M.S. “Research”, 1900. Pt. 14. The Copepoda. J. Linn. Soc. London, Zool. 36: 219-310.
- Farran, G.P. 1929. Crustacea. Pt. 10. Copepoda [Brit. Antarctic (Terra Nova) Exped., Zool. 1910]. Nat. Hist. Rep. Zool. 8(3): 203-306.
- See also Irish Natural History Literature Database
