= Robert Francis Scharff =

British zoologist, Irish museum director (1858-1934)

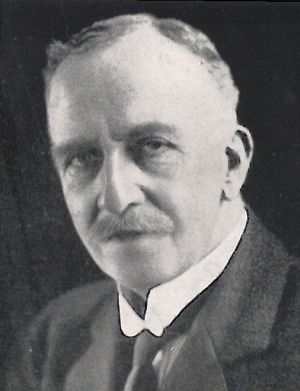
- Born: 9 July 1858; Leeds, England
- Died: 13 September 1934 (aged 76); Worthing, West Sussex, England
- Education: University College London
- Scientific career
- Fields: Zoology
- Workplaces: National Museum of Ireland

Robert Francis Scharff (9 July 1858 – 13 September 1934) was an English zoologist, known for his lifetime of work in Ireland and contributions to the understanding of Irish flora and fauna. He was acting director of the National Museum of Ireland from 1916 to 1922.

== Life ==
Scharff was born in Leeds on 9 July 1858 to German parents. He studied at University College London for a B.Sc., and furthered those studies at the universities of Edinburgh with an MA graduating in 1885, and Heidelberg where he completed a Ph.D. From there he went on to study at St. Andrews Biological Station in New Brunswick and Stazione Zoologica in Naples.

Scharff was twice married, his first wife Alice Hutton died during the 1918 flu pandemic, they had two sons together. In 1920 he married Jane Stephens with whom he had a daughter. Scharff died in Worthing on 13 September 1934.

== Career ==
Scharff was appointed as an Assistant in the Natural History Division of the National Museum of Ireland in 1887, becoming Keeper in 1890. In the years after 1916 and the resignation of George Noble Plunkett as Director of the National Museum of Ireland Scharff became the acting Director until his retirement in 1922.

Scharff was one of the main organisers and contributors to the Clare Island Survey, serving as a chair of the organising committee. He is best known for his work on biogeography, particularly the recolonisation of Ireland after the ice age. He was a vocal proponent of the land-bridge hypothesis of animal migration. This work was informed by his experience excavating caves in Kesh. Scharff was a well-known figure in his time receiving many honours like the prize of Emperor Nicholas II in 1897, and he holding the Swiney lectureship in geology in London in 1906 and 1908.

He was an active member of many societies in Ireland and the UK. Whilst a member of the Royal Irish Academy over a forty-year period, he served as vice-president, secretary for foreign correspondence, and chairman of the flora and fauna committee. He was also an active member of the Royal Zoological Society of Ireland, the Royal Dublin Society, the Conchological Society of Great Britain & Ireland, the Linnean Society and the Zoological Society of London. He collected zoological specimens extensively, many of which are housed with the National Museum of Ireland. In 1899 a species of land planarian was named in his honour, Microplana scharffi (Graff, 1899). Following his retirement, Scharff moved back to the UK, to Worthing. He still remained an active member of Irish zoological groups until his death in 1934.

== Published works ==
- The History of the European Fauna (1899)
- European Animals: Their Geological History and Geographical Distribution (1907)
- Distribution and origin of life in America (1912)
