= Aubrey Gwynn =

Irish Jesuit historian (1892–1983)

Aubrey Osborn Gwynn SJ
- Born: 17 February 1892; Dublin
- Died: 18 May 1983 (aged 91); Dublin

Aubrey Osborn Gwynn (17 February 1892 – 18 May 1983) was an Irish Jesuit historian.

== Life ==
Aubrey Gwynn was born in Dublin on 17 February 1892. His father was the author and sometime Member of Parliament Stephen Gwynn; his paternal grandfather was John Gwynn, Regius Professor of Divinity at Trinity College Dublin. His mother Mary Gwynn (generally known as May Gwynn) was a first cousin of his father's, her own father being the Reverend James Gwynn, sometime chaplain of the Octagon Chapel, Bath. The Gwynn family at that time adhered to the Protestant tradition.

Aubrey Gwynn converted to Roman Catholicism at the age of ten, at the same time as his mother May Gwynn was received into the Roman Catholic Church. He attended Clongowes Wood College, a Jesuit secondary school in Kildare, near Dublin, from 1903 to 1908, then studied at University College, Dublin (where he received his BA degree in 1914 and his MA in 1915) and Campion Hall, Oxford (where he obtained the degree of B Litt in 1919). In 1912, while still a student at University College, he became a member of the Society of Jesus.

After graduating Aubrey Gwynn worked as a teacher at Clongowes College (1917–1919), Louvain (1919–1921) and Milltown Park (1921–1925).

In 1927 Father Aubrey was appointed Lecturer in Ancient History at University College, Dublin. He went on to lecture in Medieval History (1930–1947), then in 1948 he became the college's Professor of Medieval History, a post he retained until 1962. He was President of the Royal Irish Academy from 1958 to 1961.

Aubrey Gwynn wrote extensively on Irish and church history as well as on other topics. His brother Denis Rolleston Gwynn (1893–1971) was also an historian, being for much of his life Professor of Modern Irish History at University College, Cork.

A watercolour portrait of Aubrey Gwynn as a child by his godfather Walter Osborne is in the collection of the National Gallery of Ireland.

== Works ==
- Roman Education from Cicero to Quintilian (1926)
- The English Austin Friars in the Time of Wyclif (1940)
- The Medieval Province of Armagh, 1470–1545 (1946)
- The Writings of Bishop Patrick 1074–1084 (1955)
- Medieval Religious Houses: Ireland (1970) with R. N. Hadcock
- The Irish Church in the Eleventh and Twelfth Centuries, edited by Gerard O'Brien
- Twelfth Century Reform (A History of Irish Catholicism II) (1968)
- Anglo-Irish Church Life: Fourteenth and Fifteenth Centuries (A History of Irish Catholicism) 1968
- Aubrey Gwynn, Cathal Óg mac Maghnusa and the Annals of Ulster (1998 reprint), edited by Nollaig Ó Muraíle
