= Irish Naturalists' Journal =

- Discipline: Natural History
- Language: English
- Edited by: Nigel Monaghan

Publication details
- History: 1925–present
- Publisher: Irish Naturalists’ Journal Ltd (Ireland)
- Frequency: Annual

Standard abbreviations
- ISO 4: Ir. Nat.' J.

Indexing
- ISSN: 0021-1311
- LCCN: 28017367
- JSTOR: irisnatuj

Links
- Journal homepage

The Irish Naturalists' Journal (ISSN 0021-1311) is a scientific journal covering all aspects of natural history. It has been published since 1925. It was preceded by The Irish Naturalist (1892−1924).
