= Rowland Southern =

British aquatic biologist and Irish civil servant

- Born: 1882; Adlington, Lancashire
- Died: 13 December 1935; Dublin, Ireland
- Occupation: Marine biologist

Rowland Southern (1882 – 13 December 1935) was an English aquatic biologist who specialised in the study of the fresh-water and marine life, particularly segmented worms (Annelida) of Ireland. He trained in England as a chemist and upon moving to Dublin received a post with the City Analyst. In 1906 he began work at the Natural History Museum in the city, transferring to the Fisheries branch of the Department of Agriculture and Technical Information in 1911. In 1919 he was promoted to the rank of Assistant Inspector of Fisheries, a post he held until his death.
