= Robert Lloyd Praeger =

Irish naturalist, writer, librarian, and archaeologist (1865–1953)

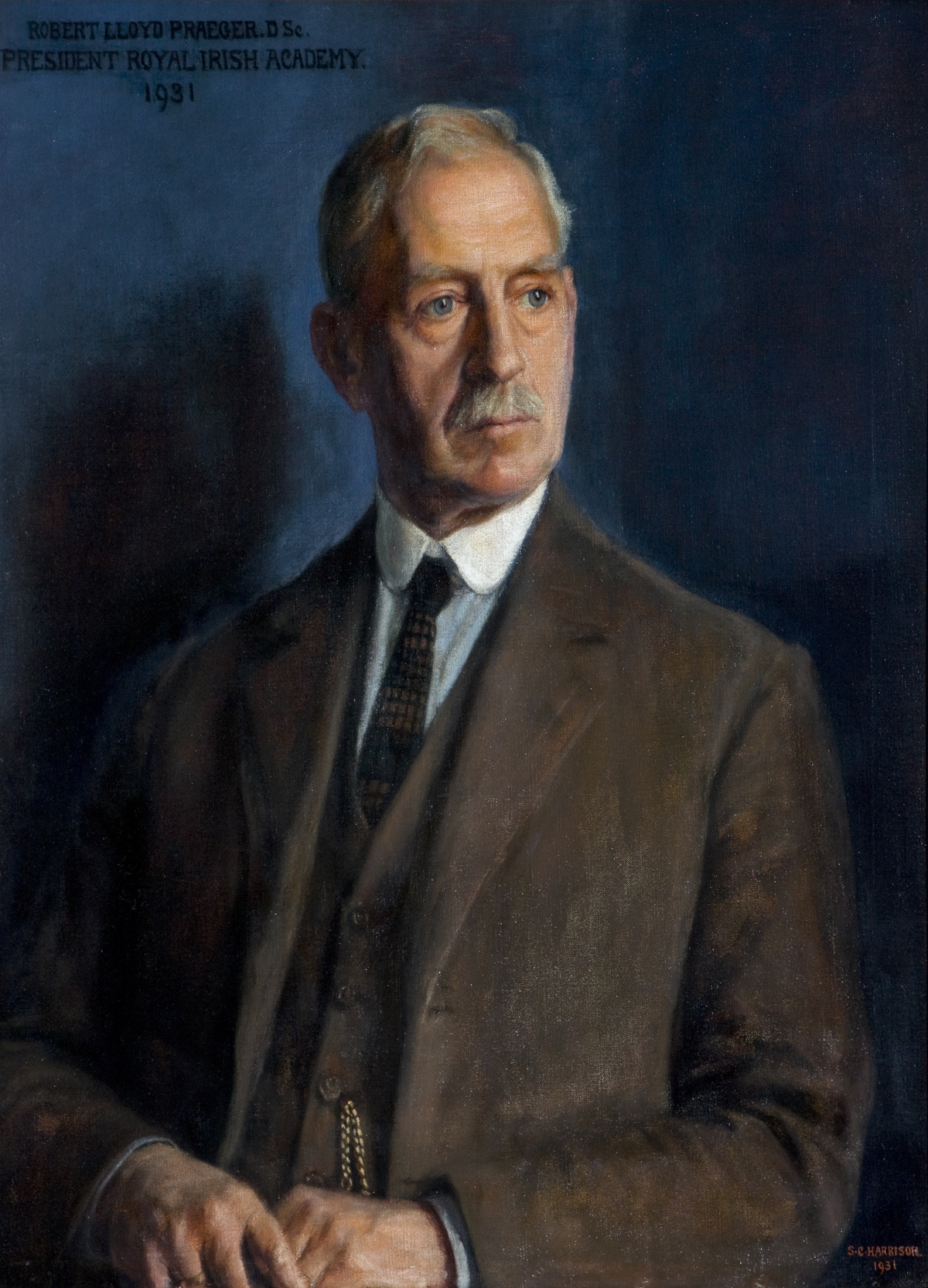
Robert Lloyd Praeger by Sarah Cecilia Harrison, now in National Museums Northern Ireland

Robert Lloyd Praeger (25 August 1865 – 5 May 1953) was an Irish naturalist, writer and librarian. He is perhaps best known for his 1937 natural-history memoir The Way That I Went.

== Biography ==
=== Early life and education ===
From a Unitarian background, he was born and raised in Holywood, County Down; he had four brothers and a sister. His father was born in the Netherlands, and imported linen, while his mother's family had a history of producing businesspeople, antiquarians and naturalists; an uncle was a co-founder of the Belfast Naturalists' Field Club. His grandfather was the naturalist Robert Patterson.

Praeger attended the primary school of the Reverend McAlister and then the nearby Sullivan Upper School, followed by the Belfast Academical Institution. He joined the Belfast Naturalists Field Club (BNFC) at age 11, and was already judging a category in the precursor to the Chelsea Flower Show at 17.

Praeger attended what is now Queen's University Belfast from 1882, earning a B.A. in 1885 and a B.Eng. in 1886. While at college, he also became very active in the BNFC, learning a range of practical naturalist skills; he was elected to the club's committee in 1885.

=== Career ===
Praeger was an engineer by qualification and initial practice, a librarian of long and senior standing by profession and a naturalist by inclination. His first job was with the Belfast city and district water commissioners, and while working with this body on an expansion of Belfast Harbour facilities, he also conducted studies on fossils, which led to his first post-college academic paper in 1886. He co-authored his first book, on the ferns of Ulster, with a businessman and botanist, in 1887. In 1888 he declined a medium-term engineering position and applied unsuccessfully for a job at the Natural History Museum in Dublin; he worked the next five years on short engineering contracts while carrying on his naturalist work. He continued to publish, and was hired to catalogue a collection of around 60,000 specimens being donated to Belfast city. He was elected as a member of the Royal Irish Academy in 1891.

In 1892, Praeger founded the Irish Naturalist, becoming its co-editor. Aside from articles, the journal contained official communications of both the Belfast Natural History and Philosophical Society and the Royal Zoological Society of Ireland.

In 1893, Praeger secured a position as an assistant librarian at the National Library of Ireland in Dublin, where he worked from 1893 to 1924, rising to the position of chief librarian.

Praeger continued to write papers on the flora and other aspects of the natural history of Ireland. He organised the Lambay Survey in 1905/06 and, from 1909 to 1915, the wider Clare Island Survey.

=== Recognition and voluntary work ===
He was awarded the Veitch Memorial Medal of the Royal Horticultural Society in 1921. He became the first President of both An Taisce and the Irish Mountaineering Club in 1948, and served as President of the Royal Irish Academy for 1931–34.

== Personal life ==
Praeger met his future wife, Hedwig Elena Ingeborg Meta Magnusson ("Hedi"), in 1901; they became engaged after two weeks, and married in 1902.

=== Personality ===
Reviewing The Way That I Went in 1937 for Studies: An Irish Quarterly Review, Irish historian Aubrey Gwynn (1892–1983) wrote:

Dr. Praeger has that queer gift of the naturalist which allows him to see life mainly as the presence of nature all around us with little or no active interest in the more human problems of this world. For him, the discovery of some new flower on our hills or in our bogs is more attractive than most other pleasures; and the relics of man's activity in some pre-historic past interest him more vitally than the sayings and doings of men to-day.

Writing in his obituary for the The Geographical Journal, Thomas William Freeman wrote:

A man of powerful physique, he knew the country from end to end because he had walked it with his charming wife and others: from choice he never owned a motor car. If he suspected that a rare plant was to be found across a lake, he swam to it, carrying his clothes in a patent rubber bag he had invented for the purpose.

=== Death ===
Prager's wife died on 18 February 1952, with her last address noted as Strawberry Hill, Dalkey, Dublin.

In his later years, Praeger suffered from arthritis and deafness, limiting his mobility. He died in Belfast on 5 May 1953, aged 87, and was buried alongside his wife in Dean's Grange Cemetery, Dublin, as per his will. He left his entire estate (including research papers on various topics) to the Royal Irish Academy.

His younger sister Sophia Rosamond Praeger (1867–1954) was a sculptor, children's book author and illustrator as well as a botanical artist.

== Achievements ==
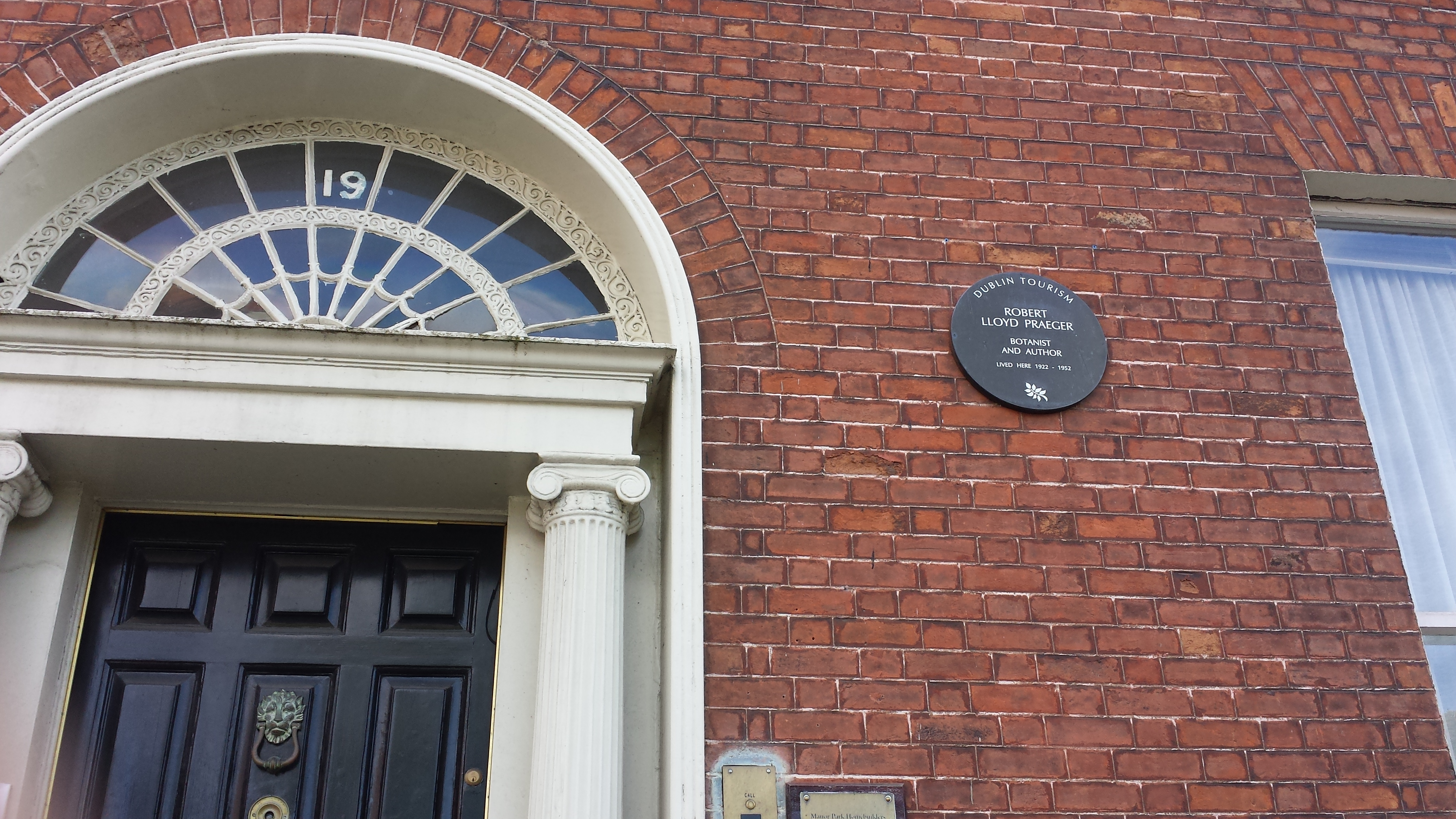
The commemorative plaque at Praeger's principal Dublin address, 19 Fitzwilliam Square, which was erected in 1987

Praeger was instrumental in developing advanced methodologies in Irish botany by inviting Knud Jessen, the acclaimed Danish expert in Glacial and Post-Glacial flora, to undertake research and teaching in Ireland. This was to lead to the establishment of 'paleoecology' as a distinct field of study in Ireland.

=== "His" counties ===
A vice-county system was adopted by Praeger, dividing Ireland into forty vice-counties based on the counties. However, the boundaries between them do not always correspond to the administrative boundaries, and there are doubts as to the correct interpretation of them.

== Legacy ==
Praeger's legacy lives on through his exceptional professionalism, which he showed during his librarian career. By age thirty-five, he displayed great organization skills in cataloguing, which "has never been equaled in Ireland". One of his significant accomplishments in the field was ordering "the National Library's vast collection of maps".

=== Surveys ===
Praeger planned The Lambay Island Survey in 1909 and contributed "90 new species to the Irish flora and fauna"; five of these "species were new to science". The success of this survey led a committee of Irish naturalists to ask Praeger to complete the Clare Island Survey. Praeger's work on the Flowering Plants in this survey analyses "the dispersal power of plants". The most notable discovery is the Pisonidae worm by Rowland Southern. Southern dedicated this new genus to Praeger in his work Archiannelida and Polychaeta. In 1988, the Royal Irish Academy proposed carrying out a New Clare Island Survey due to the success of Praeger’s first Clare Island survey.

=== Grants ===
The "RIA Robert Lloyd Praeger Fund" was set up to assist fieldwork in Irish natural science. Since 1958, the fund has provided roughly three hundred and sixty grants to natural historians for fieldwork initiatives in Ireland.

=== Literary works ===
The Way That I Went (1937) is an autobiographical book. For Praeger, the book serves as "a kind of thank offering" for all of the time he spent "walking the countryside…and exploring cattle-tramped tombs". Praeger provides a "greater influence on Irish naturalists than any other book".

Some of his other publications are:

1. *Open air studies in botany first edition (1897)
2. *Irish topographical botany (1901)
3. *An Account of the Sempervivum Group (1932)
4. *A populous solitude (1941)
5. *The Irish landscape (1953)

=== An Taisce ===
Praeger was the “force behind the foundation of An Taisce in 1948”. In his speech he mentions the issue of ribbon development as the “continuous line of houses should shut out welcome views of the wide open country that lies behind them” which will affect tourism. In 2022, An Taisce produced a Clean Air Strategy for Ireland and a Climate Action Plan in 2023. Thus, to this day, An Taisce’s policies have allowed for the continuation of work for Ireland’s conservation and Praeger’s legacy.

== Selected publications ==
- Praeger, R.Ll. Irish Topographical Botany (ITB), Proceedings of the Royal Irish Academy, Vol. (23) 3rd. series, Vol. 7).
- Praeger, R.Ll. 1893. The Flora of County Armagh. Ir Nat.: II.
- Praeger, R.Ll. et al. 1902. The exploration of the caves of Kesh, Co. Sligo. Trans. R. Ir. Acad., 32B: 171 – 214.
- Praeger, R.Ll. 1902. Gleanings in Irish Topographical Botany. Proc. Roy. Irish Academy, 24B: 61- 94.
- Praeger, R.Ll. 1901 Irish Topographical Botany: Supplement 1901 – 1905. Proc. Roy. Irish Academy, 26B: 13 – 45.
- Praeger, R. Lloyd (1921). "An account of the genus Sedum as found in cultivation". Journal of the Royal Horticultural Society. 46: 1–314.
- Praeger, R.Ll. 1929. Report on recent additions to the Irish fauna and flora (Phanerogramia). Proc. Roy. Irish Academy 39B: 57 – 78.
- Praeger, R.Ll. 1932. Some noteworthy plants found in or reported from Ireland. Proc. Roy. Irish Academy. 41B: 95 – 24.
- Praeger, R.Ll. 1934a. The Botanist in Ireland. Dublin.
- Praeger, R.Ll. 1934b. A contribution to the flora of Ireland. Proc. Roy. Irish Academy. 42B: 55 – 86.
- Praeger, R.Ll. 1937 The Way That I Went, An Irishman in Ireland, Allen Figgis, Dublin 1980, ISBN 0-900372-93-1
- Praeger, R.Ll. 1939. A further contribution to the flora of Ireland. Proc. Roy. Irish Academy. 45B: 231 – 254.
- Praeger, R.Ll. 1946. Additions to the knowledge of the Irish Flora, 1939– 1945. Proc. Roy. Irish Academy. 51B: 27 – 51.
- Praeger, R.Ll. 1951. Hybrids in the Irish flora: a tentative list. Proc. Roy. Irish Academy. 54B: 1 – 14.
- Praeger, R.Ll. 1949. Some Irish Naturalists, a Biographical Note-book. Dundalk.

== See also ==
- Clare Island
- Carrowkeel
- Knud Jessen
