= Barry Raftery =

Irish archaeologist and academic

- Born: 16 August 1944; Dublin, Ireland
- Died: 22 August 2010 (aged 66)
- Occupations: Archaeologist; professor
- Spouse: Nuala Sproule

Academic background
- Education: University College Dublin; LMU Munich

Academic work
- Discipline: Prehistory, Iron Age
- Institutions: University College Dublin
- Notable works: Pagan Celtic Ireland: The Enigma of the Iron Age

Barry Raftery (16 August 1944 – 22 August 2010) was an Irish archaeologist and academic. He is best known for his pioneering work in wetland archaeology and Iron Age hillforts in Ireland. He was Professor of Celtic Archaeology in University College Dublin (UCD) for more than thirty years, and served as chair of the Department of Celtic Archaeology at UCD from 1996 to his retirement in 2007.

== Early life and education ==
Barry Joseph Raftery was born in Dublin, Ireland on 16 August 1944. He was the son of an Irish father and German mother, Joseph and Lotte Raftery. His father, Joseph, was an archaeologist who specialized in prehistoric Ireland and was keeper of Irish antiquities and Director of the National Museum of Ireland during his long career. Barry Raftery developed an interest in archaeology at the age of ten, after spending two summers working with his father in the excavations at Lough Gara.

Raftery attended Belvedere College secondary school in Dublin. He studied archaeology and geography at UCD where he earned a BA in 1965. He met his future wife, Nuala Sproule at the University. Rafferty earned an MA at UCD in 1967. He completed his PhD in 1977 after ten years of further studies and research in Europe and Ireland.

== Career ==
From 1969 to 1970, Raftery spent a year as a visiting professor of European prehistory at LMU Munich. He travelled throughout Europe, visiting museums, research institutes and excavations, furthering his studies of the European Iron Age. In 1970, he was appointed to a lectureship in the Department of Archaeology at UCD. During the 1970s, his research centered on late prehistoric hillforts in Ireland; His most important project was the excavation of Rathgall Hillfort in County Wicklow. In 1981, Raftery was awarded an Alexander von Humboldt research fellowship at the University of Marburg, where he spent two years.

During the 1980s, Raftery research interests turned to wetland archaeology. In 1985, he initiated a new research program at UCD on prehistoric Irish wetland sites. His initial project was the study of the trackways of raised bogs in Ireland. His first excavation resulted in the most important find of his career, the massive, Iron Age Corlea Trackway in County Longford. Raftery was instrumental in establishing the Irish Archeological Wetland Unit (IAWU] at UCD in 1990. He led the IAWU excavation at the Corlea site again in 1991. His team was able to successfully lift and preserve a large portion of the ancient track and understructure. It was the largest conversation project undertaken in Ireland at the time.

In 1994, Raftery published his seminal work, Pagan Celtic Ireland: The Enigma of the Irish Iron Age. Raftery was visiting professor at LMU Munich from 1988 to 1990, at Kiel University in 1991 and the University of Vienna in 1997. He was appointed chair of Celtic Archaeology at UCD in 1996. Raftery retired in 2007.

== Selected publications ==
- Raftery, Barry (1983). A catalogue of Irish Iron Age antiquities. Marburg: Druckerei Kempkes. ISBN 3924222002.
- Raftery, Barry (1984). La Tène in Ireland: Problems of Origin and Chronology. University of Marburg. ISBN 9783924222017.
- Raftery, Barry (1994). Pagan Celtic Ireland: The Enigma of the Irish Iron Age. Thames and Hudson. ISBN 978-0500279830.
