= William Higgins (chemist) =

Irish chemist

William Higgins (1763 – June 1825), an Irish chemist, was one of the early proponents of atomic theory. Known mainly for his speculative ideas on chemical combination, William Higgins is popular for the insights his life offers into the emergence of chemistry as a career during the British Industrial Revolution. Despite an evident charm, his erratic behaviour and tendency to indulge personal animosities prevented him from engaging the affections of London society. Instead he found refuge in a succession of government-supported chemical positions in Dublin. Thanks to the combination of such scientific opportunities with family resources, he became a very wealthy man.

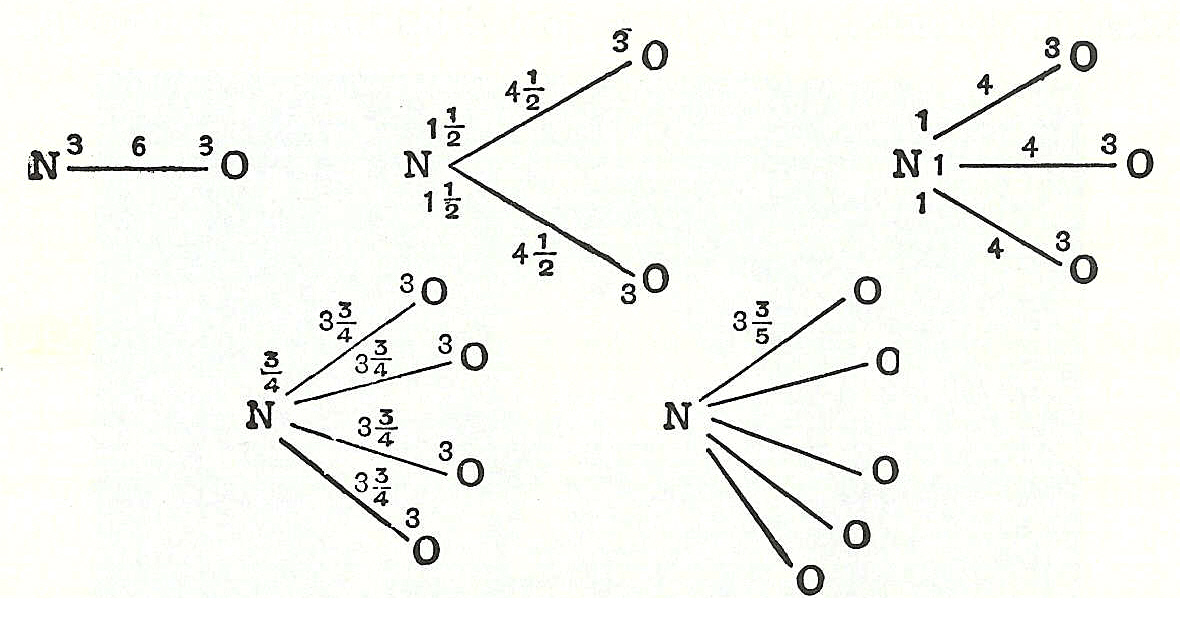
Higgins Ultimate Particles

== Early years ==
Higgins was born in Collooney, County Sligo, Ireland, and came from a well-known medical family. William was the second child and younger son of Thomas Higgins, a physician educated at the University of Edinburgh. William’s uncle Bryan Higgins was also an eminent chemist. When William was a boy he was sent to London to live with his uncle. Under his uncle’s guidance, William developed a strong liking for and expertise in experimental chemistry.

== Beginning experiments ==
In the early 1780s William assisted in making all the experiments detailed in his uncle Bryan Higgins’ Experiments and Observations Relating to Acetous Acid. In 1785 William undertook a mineralogical tour through England, also visiting a number of chemical manufacturers. In 1788 he entered Pembroke College, Oxford but did not complete his degree. His next four years after that were spent in London, where he published two editions of his most important work, the Comparative View of Phlogistic and Antiphlogistic Theories which laid out much of Dalton's atomic theory 19 years earlier.

== Start of his career ==
After a disagreement with his uncle, William left London and went to Dublin to be a chemist at Apothecaries Hall in 1792. William was soon busy equipping the laboratory, attending the Royal Irish Academy, and acting as a part-time chemist to the Irish Linen Board. But when the company had financial troubles William lost his job. At the suggestion of Richard Kirwan, William became supervisor of the important Leskean Cabinet of minerals, recently acquired by the Royal Dublin Society. Soon after William became professor of chemistry to the Society.

In 1803, William had a leave of absence from the Dublin Society, which enabled him to sit on a London committee selecting a hydrometer to measure the strength of alcoholic drinks for revenue purposes. It was in London that William met Humphry Davy, a protégé of his uncle Bryan. Davy was one of William’s proposers to the Royal Society in 1806. William and Humphry’s relationship flourished from 1810 on, when Humphry promoted William’s claims to the discovery of the chemical atomic theory over those of their rival John Dalton. William’s claims to the discovery of the chemical atomic theory is found in Comparative View. William sought to make clear the mechanisms of possible reactions between ultimate particles by using diagrams of the reacting particles and the affinity forces between them. Evidence has recently been presented that Dalton may have been aware of the Comparative View when he developed his atomic theory.

== Death ==
In June 1825, William Higgins died at Grafton Street, Dublin.

== References and notes ==
- Observations and Experiments on the Atomic Theory, William Higgins, Published in 1814.
- T S Wheeler and J B Partington, The Life and Work of William Higgins, Chemist 1763–1825 (1960)
