= Rathgall Hillfort =

Bronze Age hill fort in Ireland

Coordinates: 52°48′08″N 6°39′47″W

Rathgall Hill Fort
- An Ráth Gheal
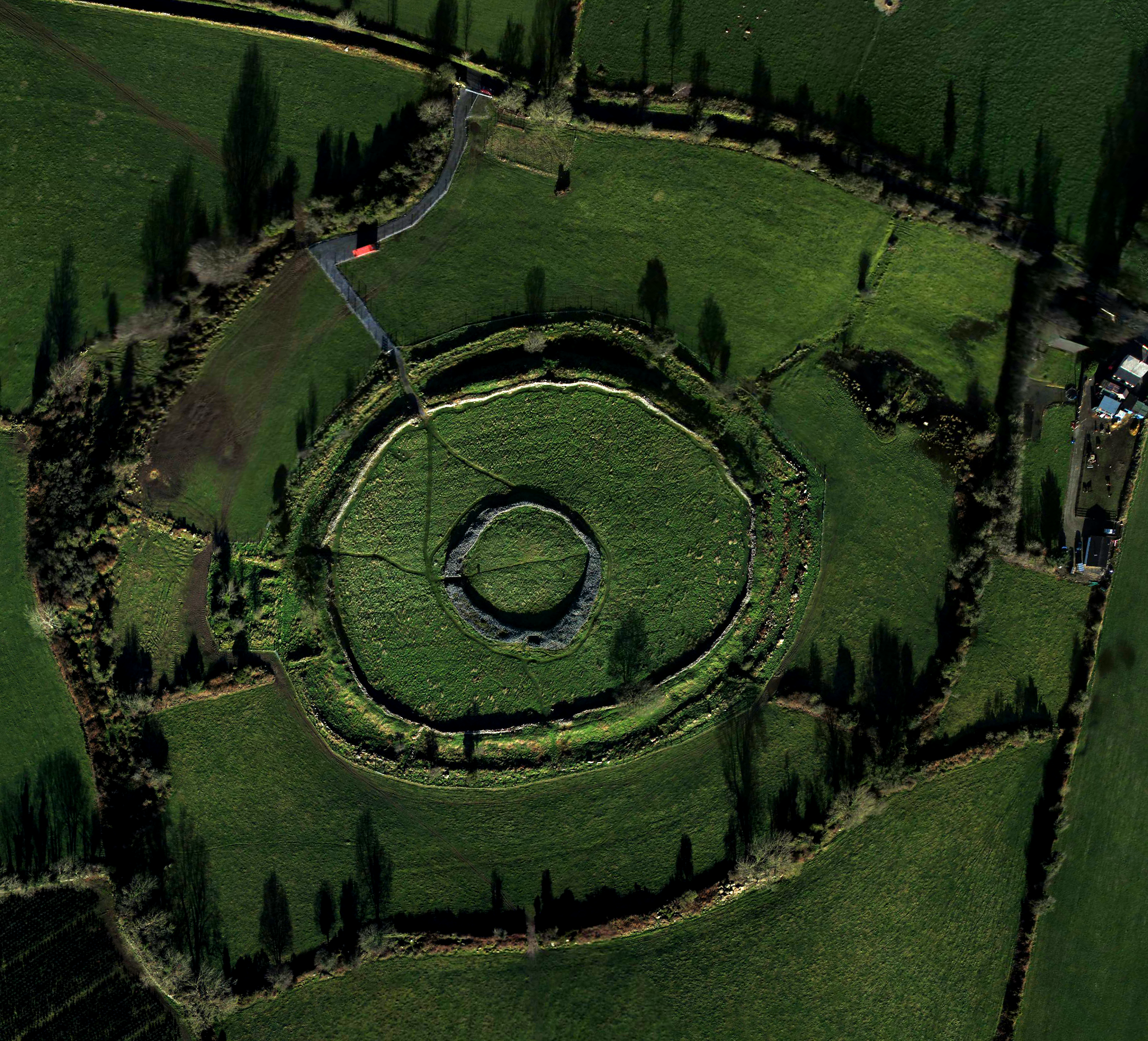
- Aerial view of the fort
- Interactive map of Rathgall Hill Fort
- Type: Multivallate hill fort
- Periods: Bronze Age
- Location: County Wicklow, Province of Leinster

History
- Built: 1200-900BC

Site notes
- Width: 15 m (49 ft)
- Area: 7.5 ha (19 acres)
- Excavation dates: 1969
- Condition: Partially preserved
- Owner: Public
- Public access: Yes

National monument of Ireland
- Official name: Rathgall
- Reference no.: 422

Rathgall (Irish: An Ráth Gheal), or the Ring of the Rath, is a large multivallate hill fort in County Wicklow, Ireland. Dating from the Bronze Age, it consists of three roughly concentric stone ramparts with a fourth masonry wall dating from the Medieval period at its centre. Rathgall is a National Monument which is in state care. It is 5 km east of Tullow.

Excavations (1969-1975) led by Barry Raftery of the site are only partial, but yielded numerous artefacts including ceramic vessels, pot sherds and glass beads, which point to the middle to late Bronze Age activity on the site. A large circular, post-built building (15m, 48 ft diameter) stood within the forts enclosing ditch. A number of gold items have been found at the site also, as well as a burial site linked with later use of the site. Evidence of metal working comes from casts for tools and weapons, with burials pointing to a ritual element to the site beyond its agricultural and domestic use. Finds at the site include: 96 glass beads, ornaments of gold, jet, amber, and lignite. Other finds include: tools, a sword blade, a spearhead and a socketed axe head. An early Iron Age iron smelting furnace was found along with evidence of a Medieval era house, coins and potshards.

There are numerous legends that are associated with the site including fairies and as a site of pilgrimage for childless couples.
