= Lynn Scarff =

Irish science communication specialist and museum director

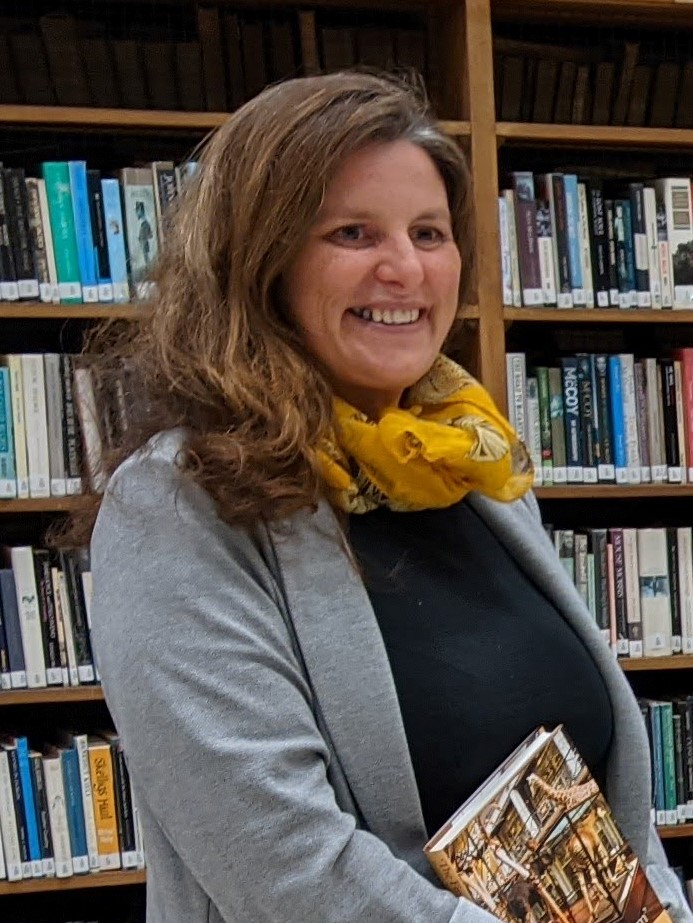
- Scarff, in a scarf, at the book launch of The First National Museum by Sherra Murphy in 2021
- Education: Trinity College Dublin (MSc)
- Occupation: Director of the National Museum of Ireland

Lynn Scarff is an Irish science communication specialist, museum curator, and former teacher. Since May 2018, she has served as Director of the National Museum of Ireland. Her appointment had been announced in January 2018, in succession to Raghnall Ó Floinn. She had previously worked at the Science Gallery Dublin (part of Trinity College, Dublin) as its education and outreach manager, before serving as its Director from 2014 to 2018.
