= Joseph Raftery =

- Born: 1913; Dublin, Ireland
- Died: 12 May 1992 (aged 78–79)
- Relatives: Barry Raftery (son)

Joseph Raftery (1913 – 12 May 1992) was an Irish archaeologist and director of the National Museum of Ireland.

== Early life and family ==
Joseph Raftery was born in Dublin in 1913. His father was the governor of Mountjoy prison, John Raftery. For the majority of his childhood, Raftery lived in Portlaoise, County Laois. He attended the local St Mary's Christian Brothers' School, having won a scholarship. He entered University College Dublin on a scholarship, graduating with a degree in Celtic Studies in 1933. He went on to complete a master's degree in archaeology in 1934 with a thesis on "Archaeological monuments in Counties Laois and Tipperary". He travelled to Europe to visit museum collections on an archaeology bursary. When he returned he was selected to work on the Harvard Archaeological Mission to Ireland with Hugh O'Neill Hencken to improve his field-work skills.

He studied at the University of Marburg on a von Humboldt fellowship, receiving his doctorate in 1939. He married Charlotte Lang, whom he met in Germany, the same year. The couple were able to leave Germany just before the outbreak of World War II. They had two sons, with Barry also becoming an archaeologist.

== Career ==
Raftery joined the staff of the National Museum of Ireland (NMI) in 1939, and was promoted to acting keeper of Irish antiquities in 1945 after Adolf Mahr left the position. He was appointed keeper in 1949. He was promoted to director of the NMI in 1976, a position he held until his retirement in 1979. With curatorial duties over the national archaeological collections, Raftery made additions to the museum's collections, including the Gorteenreagh gold hoard from County Clare, the bronze and gold hoard of iron-age objects from Somerset, County Galway.

His 1951 Prehistoric Ireland was his first major publication, and was an attempt to provide a comprehensive body of illustrations of Irish archaeology. Throughout his career, and into retirement, Raftery published widely on subjects such as the long stone-cist burials of the Irish Iron Age, Viking era silver, and a number of gold hoards. Notably, Raftery disagreed with the 1979 decision by the Irish High Court to rule the Wood Quay site in Dublin a national monument.

Raftery also served on a number of professional and scholarly bodies, including as president of the Royal Society of Antiquaries of Ireland. In 1941 he was elected a member of the Royal Irish Academy, serving on its council a number of times, as well as vice-president from 1963 to 1965 and president in 1967.

Raftery died 12 May 1992.
