= National Museum of Ireland =

Cultural institution in Dublin and Mayo, Ireland

- Ard-Mhúsaem na hÉireann
- The current logo of the museum
- Established: 14 August 1877; 149 years ago
- Location: Dublin and Castlebar, Ireland
- Type: National museum
- Collection size: Almost 4,000,000 items
- Visitors: All branches: 1,315,776 (2016)
- Director: Lynn Scarff
- Website: www.museum.ie

National Museum of Ireland network
- Archaeology; Decorative Arts & History; Country Life; Natural History

The National Museum of Ireland (Irish: Ard-Mhúsaem na hÉireann) is Ireland's leading museum institution, with a strong emphasis on national and some international archaeology, Irish history, Irish art, culture, and natural history. It has three branches in Dublin, the archaeology and natural history museums adjacent on Kildare Street and Merrion Square, and a newer Decorative Arts and History branch at the former Collins Barracks, and the Country Life museum in County Mayo.

== History ==
=== Predecessors ===
The National Museum of Ireland descends from the amalgamation of parts of the collections of a number of Dublin cultural institutions from the 18th and 19th centuries, including primarily the Royal Dublin Society (RDS) and the Royal Irish Academy (RIA). The earliest parts of the collections are largely geological and mineralogical specimens, which the RDS collected as a means to improve the knowledge and use of such resources in Ireland. The establishment of the museum collections is generally deemed to have begun with the purchase of the collection of Nathanael Gottfried Leske in 1792.

One of the earliest iterations of the RDS museum was at Hawkins Street House, where the Leskean Cabinet was displayed along with a collection of casts and busts. This exhibition was open to the public between noon and 3pm, on Mondays, Wednesdays and Fridays. Aside from the exhibition, there was a lecture hall, laboratory and library. From here, the museum moved to Leinster House in 1815 when the RDS purchased it from the 3rd Duke of Leinster. Here the Leskean Cabinet continued to be displayed, along with newly accessioned collections from professor of mineralogy and geology, Charles Lewis Giescke, curiosities, and the Hibernicum which was a display of minerals and geological specimens from the island of Ireland.

=== Name and new building ===
Giescke was the first to refer to the museum as the "National Museum of Ireland", in 1832, in his catalogue of the entomology and ornithology specimens. After Giescke's death in 1833, John Scouler was appointed curator in 1834. During this time the collections were open to the public two days a week from noon to 3pm, and to students at all times.

By this time the need for a new museum was deemed to be critical. This led to the construction of the building which now houses the Natural History Museum on Merrion Street. With the planned expansion and development of the museum, Scouler requested that a curator or Director be employed by the RDS. This led to the appointment of Alexander Carte in 1851. Carte overhauled and reorganised the collections, overseeing acquisitions from Sir Francis McClintock, Sir William Wilde, and Sir Richard Griffith.

The museum took part in the International Exhibition of Art-Industry of 1853, exhibiting objects in the Hall of Antiquities, along with the RIA. Following this the museum opened five days a week to the public.

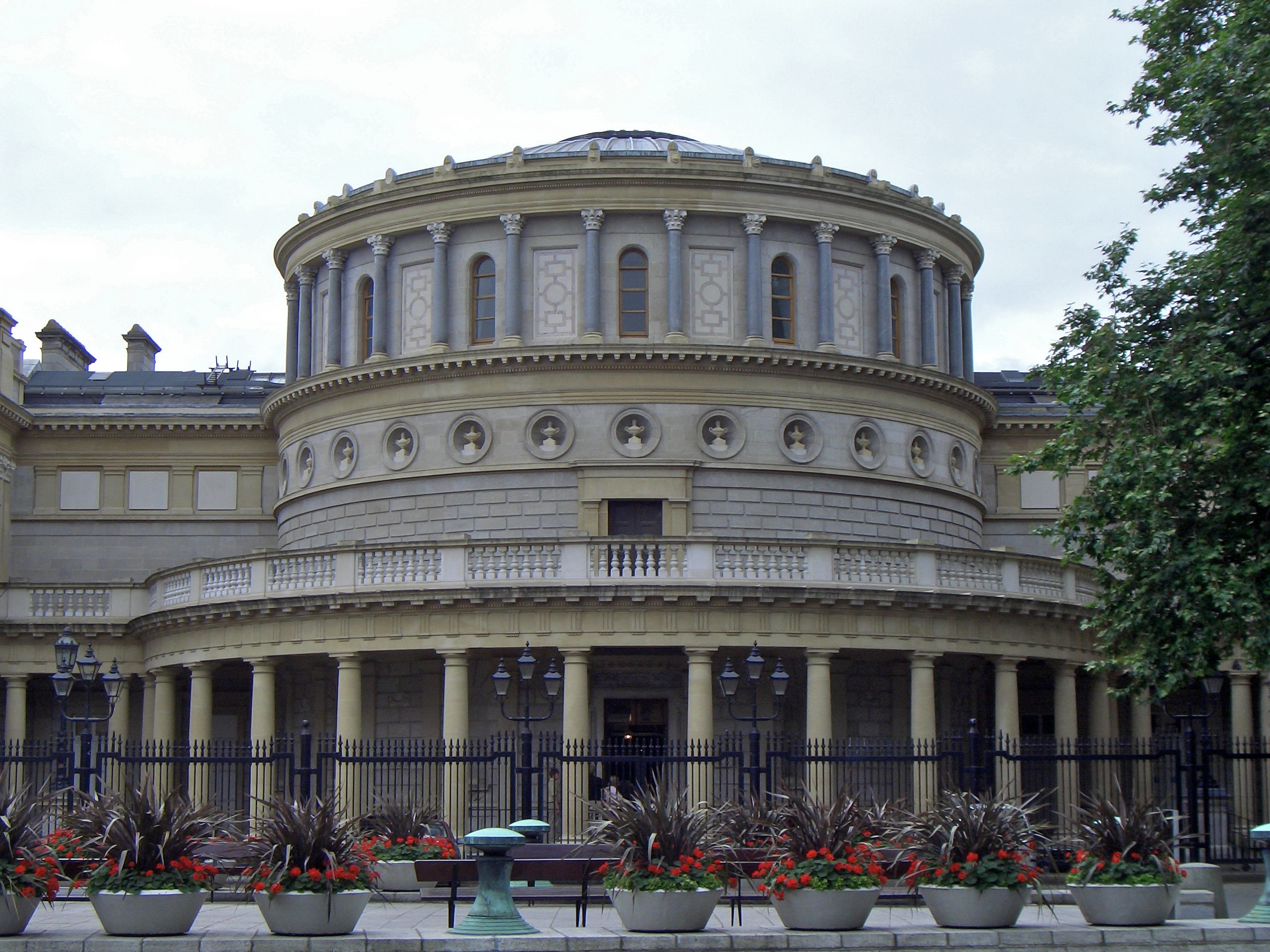
National Museum of Ireland – Archaeology, Kildare Street

The Science and Art Museum was established in 1877, becoming the National Museum of Science and Art in 1900, and the National Museum of Ireland after independence. It also included the collection of the Museum of Irish Industry, which had been founded in 1847. The collections of both the RIA and RDS formed the basis for the Archaeology and History section of the Museum at Kildare Street. This is the site originally opened in 1890 as the Dublin Museum of Science and Art, in the building designed by Sir Thomas Newenham Deane and his son, Thomas Manly Deane. Until 1922, the museum complex also included Leinster House, now the home of the Oireachtas.

According to the annual journal Museum Ireland:

In Ireland, the educational perception of the museum's role, already well-established under British rule, was given further administrative credence at the founding of the Free State when the National Museum and the National Library were attached to the Department of Education. And this perception was further enhanced by the 1937 Constitution, article 41 of which guarantees the basic right of free primary education for all citizens.

=== After independence ===
The museum operated in the buildings at Kildare Street and Merrion Square until the late 20th century projects at Collins Barracks and County Mayo. As of 1975, the visitable collections were summarised as "Primary: Irish antiquities and history, fine arts (excluding painting and sculpture) and natural history (excluding botany), and additionally: Egyptian, Greek and Roman antiquities, Far Eastern art and ceramics, and ethnography and zoology," with an additional collection of folk life material not on display. The museum published occasional works focusing on particular parts of the collection, archaeological acquisitions and one volume on the role of the museum.

== Divisions ==
See also Category:Collection of the National Museum of Ireland The museum operates at four locations, each with a thematic focus:

- National Museum of Ireland – Archaeology, Kildare Street, Dublin
- National Museum of Ireland – Decorative Arts and History, Arbour Hill, Dublin
- National Museum of Ireland – Natural History, Merrion Street, Dublin
- National Museum of Ireland – Country Life, near Castlebar

=== Archaeology ===
The objects in the care of the National Museum of Ireland – Archaeology on Kildare Street include bronze and Iron-age goldwork, early medieval church treasures, and objects from the Vikingperiod. The collection holds artefacts from prehistoric Ireland including bog bodies, Iron and Bronze Age objects such as axe heads, swords and shields in bronze, silver and gold, with the earliest dated to c. 7000 BC. It holds the world's largest collection of post-Roman Irish medieval art (known as Insular art). Many of these pieces were found in the 19th century by labourers, when population expansion led to the cultivation of land which had not been touched since the Middle Ages. Indeed, without the intervention of George Petrie of the Royal Irish Academy and like-minded individuals from the Royal Society of Antiquaries of Ireland, most of the metalwork would have been melted down for the intrinsic value of its materials.

In addition, the museum houses classical objects from Ancient Egypt, Cyprus and the Roman world.

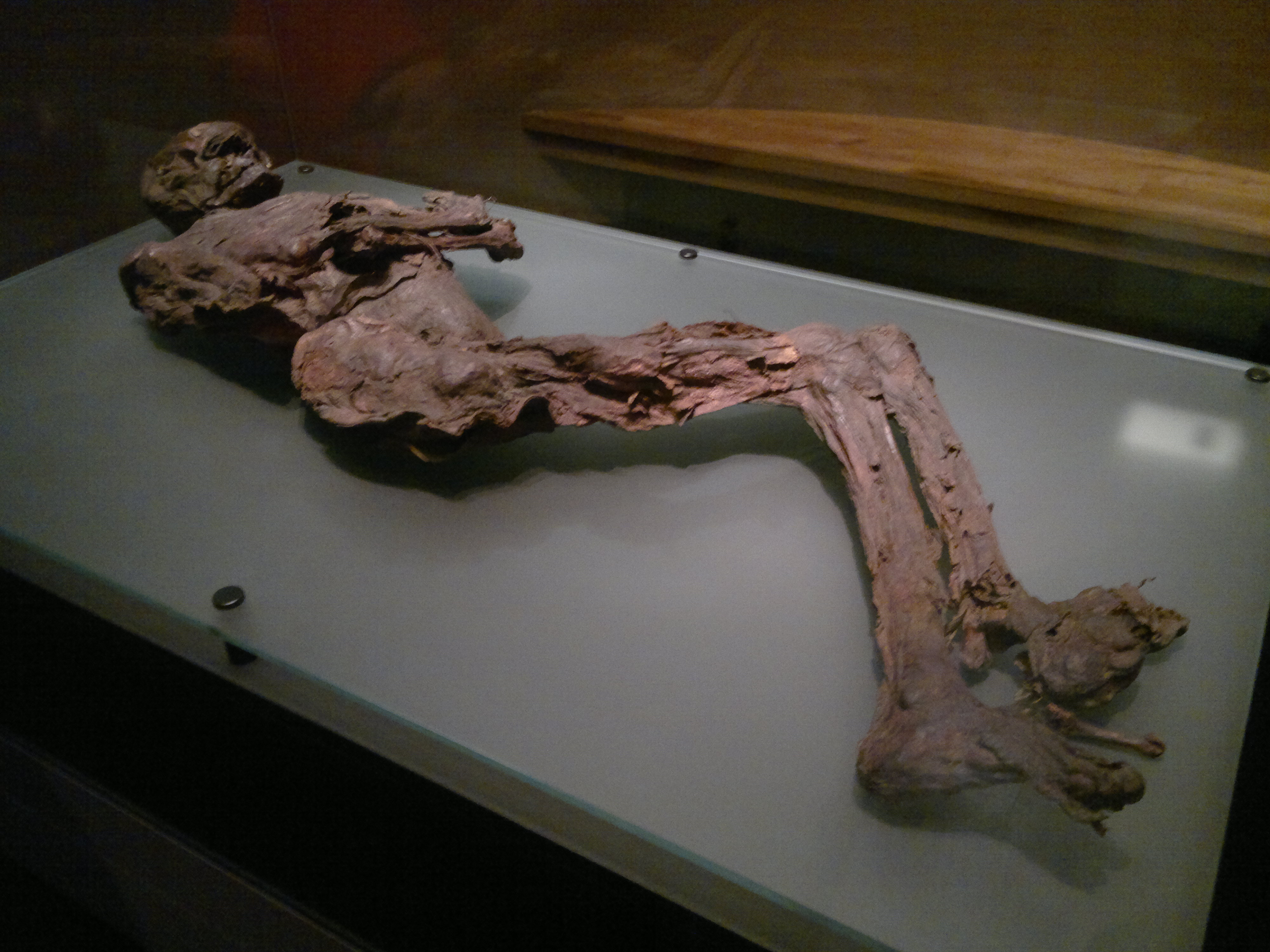
Gallagh Man, 470-120 BC

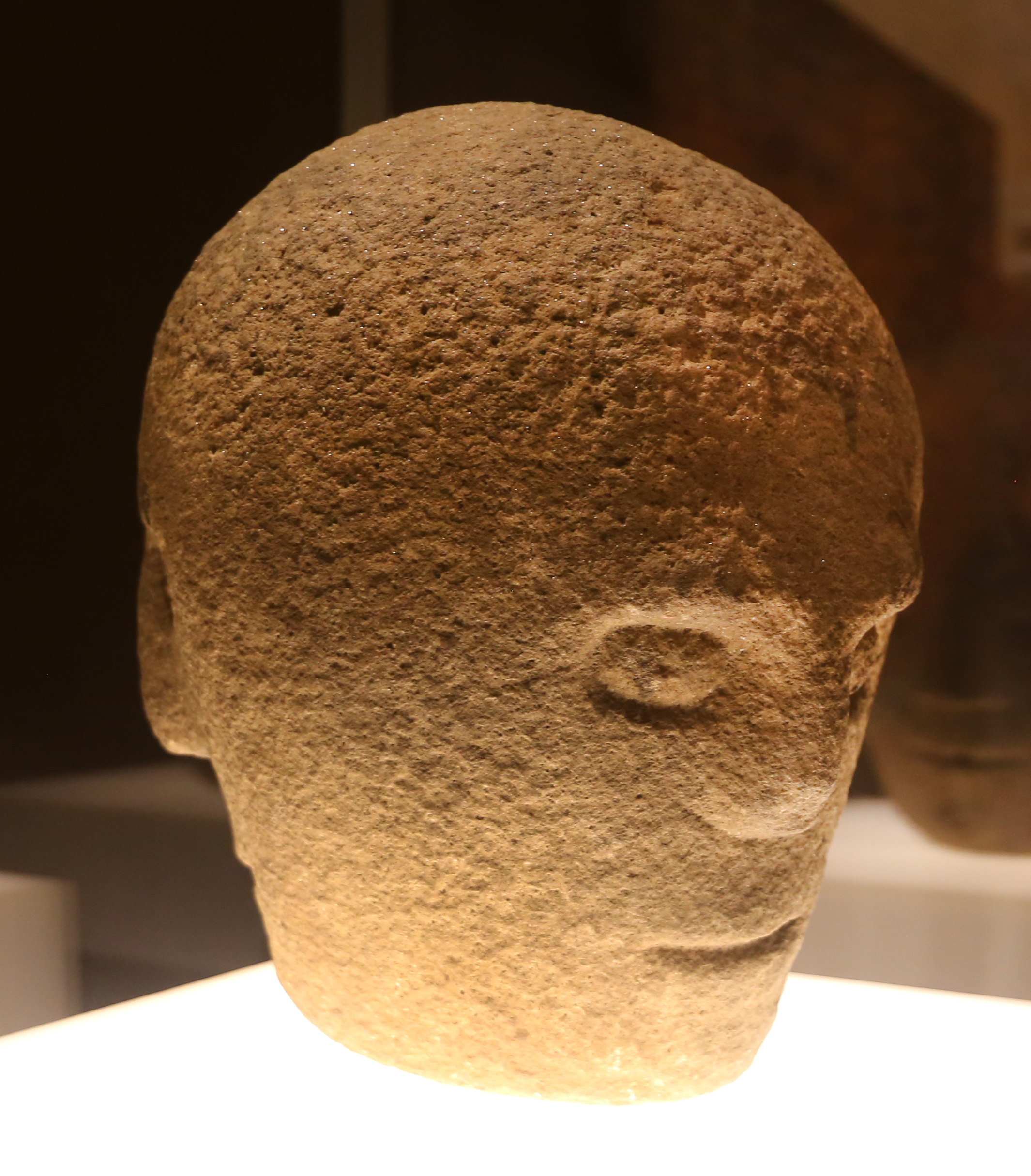
The Corleck Head, 1st- or 2nd-century AD

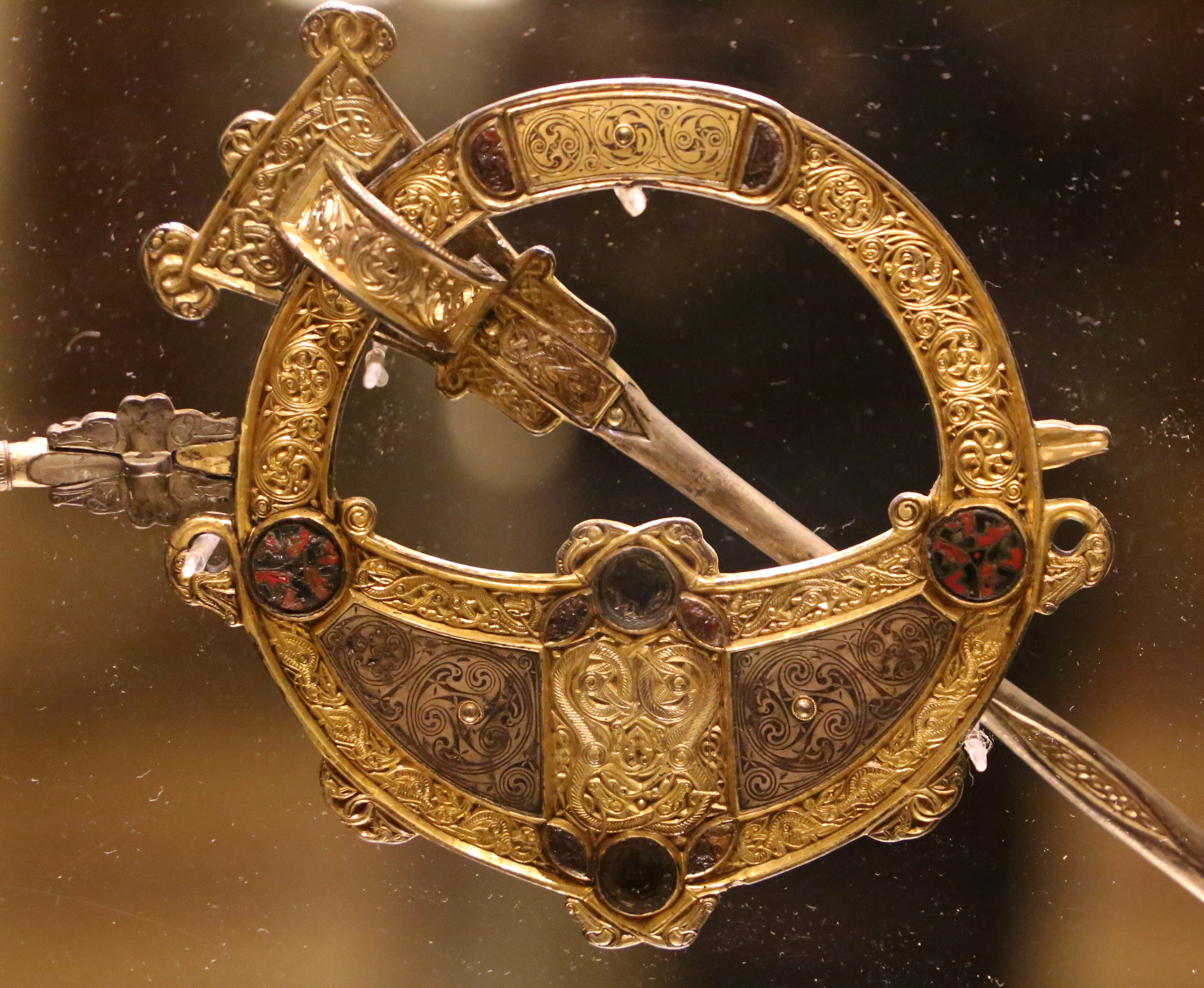
The Tara Brooch, 7th- or early 8th-century AD

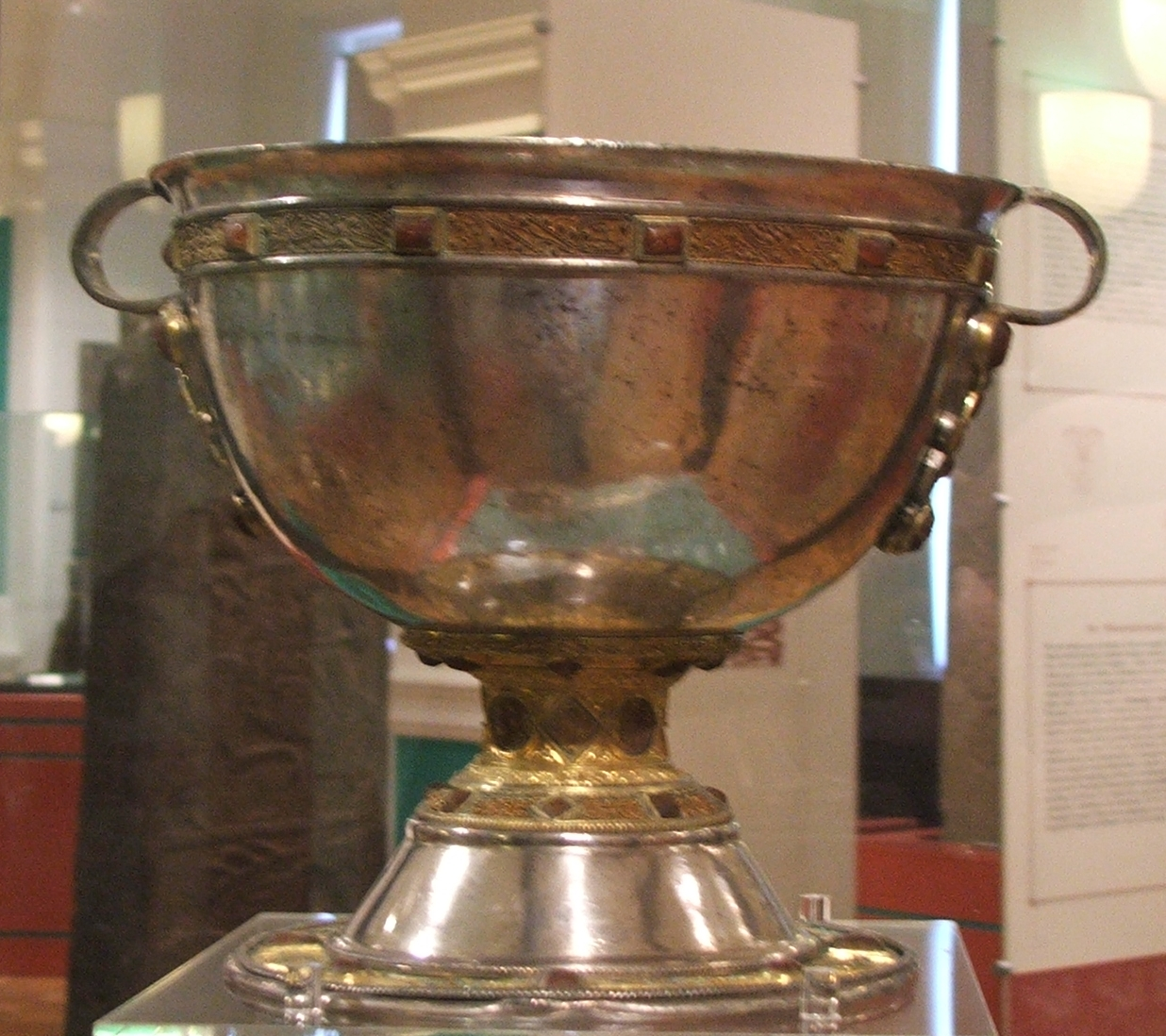
The Derrynaflan Chalice, 8th- or 9th-century AD

=== Decorative Arts and History ===
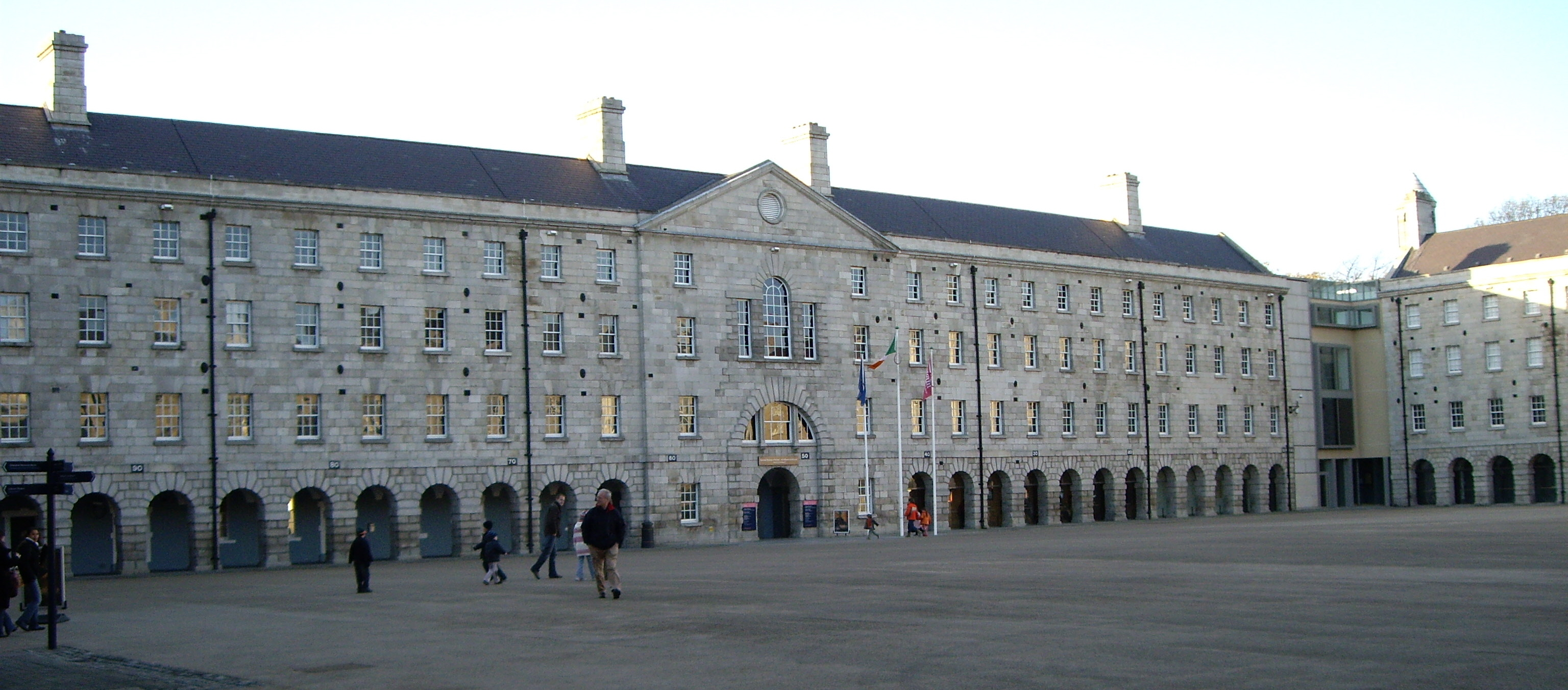
Main courtyard of Collins Barracks

The National Museum of Ireland – Decorative Arts and History is the part of the national collection kept at the large Collins Barracks site, a former military barracks named after Michael Collins in 1922. The collection at this branch, opened in 1997, includes the Great Seal of the Irish Free State. The site has a shop and a cafe, and also hosts the overall administrative centre of the National Museum.

This section has displays of furniture, silver, ceramics and glassware, as well as examples of folk life and costume, and money and weapons. A Chinese porcelain vase from about 1300 AD, the Fonthill vase, is one of the features. The Soldiers & Chiefs exhibition features military artefacts and memorabilia tracing Ireland's military history from 1550 to the present. Special exhibitions are mounted regularly; in summer 2007, for example, replicas of six Irish High Crosses that were subsequently shown internationally.

=== Natural History Museum ===
The Natural History Museum, which is part of the National Museum, although often thought of as distinct, is on Merrion Street in Dublin and houses specimens of animals from around the world. It is also known as the Dead Zoo by locals. Its collection and Victorian appearance have not changed significantly since the early 20th century.

=== Country Life ===
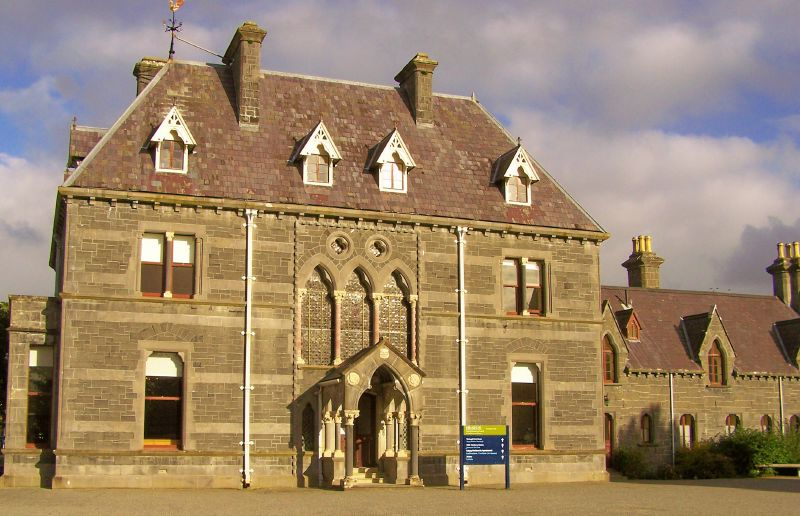
Landlord's old house next to the Museum of Country Life

Country Life is the most recent part of the museum to be opened. It is located just outside Turlough village, on the N5 eight kilometres east of Castlebar, in County Mayo, and was opened in 2001.

The museum is focused on ordinary life from the mid-19th century to the mid-20th century, with much of the material coming from rural Ireland in the 1930s. There are displays on the home, the natural environment, communities and forces for change.

== Organisation ==
The Museum is overseen by a board of directors, of whom two are nominated by the Royal Irish Academy and one by the Royal Dublin Society, while the remainder are appointed by the relevant minister.

It is led operationally by a Director, under whom are a Head of Collections and Learning and a Head of Operations. Reporting to the Head of Collections and Learning are the Keepers of Antiquities, Art & Industry, Natural History, and Folklife, the Registrar, and the Heads of Conservation, Education, Design and Photography. Within Operations are the Heads of Facilities, Human Resources, Finance, Corporate Affairs, Marketing, Commercial Development and ICT.

=== List of directors ===
- 1877–1883: William Edward Steele
- 1883–1894: Valentine Ball
- 1895–1907: George Tindall Plunkett (Colonel Plunkett)
- 1907–1916: George Noble Plunkett (Count Plunkett)
- 1916–1921: Robert Francis Scharff (acting director)
- 1921–1929: J.J. Buckley (acting director)
- 1934–1939: Adolf Mahr
- 1939–1947: Patrick O'Connor (acting director)
- 1947–1954: Michael Quane (in position of "Administrator")
- 1954–1976: Anthony T. Lucas
- 1976–1979: Joseph Raftery
- 1979–1988: Breandán Ó Ríordáin
- 1988–2012: Pat (Patrick F.) Wallace
  - November 1995 – April 1996: Eamonn (Ned) Kelly, acting director (no formal appointment)
- 2012–2013: Seamus Lynam (acting director while Head of Services)
- 2013–2018: Raghnall Ó Floinn
- 2018 to present: Lynn Scarff

== Controversy ==
The museum is one of many holding Benin Bronzes, taken from their place of origin, Benin City, Nigeria, in 1897. It has confirmed that it will be taking action to repatriate these back to their city of origin.

== Selected references ==
- Short Histories of Irish Barracks by Patrick Denis O'Donnell, in An Cosantóir (Journal of the Irish Defence Forces), 1969–1973.
- Dublin's Collins Barracks over the years, by Patrick Denis O'Donnell in Hollybough, December 1994.
- Dublin Barracks – A Brief History of Collins Barracks, by Mairead Dunleavy, National Museum of Ireland, 2002 (largely based on work by PD O'Donnell, as acknowledged in Preface and Acknowledgements).

=== Further reading ===
- Treasures of early Irish art, 1500 B.C. to 1500 A.D.: from the collections of the National Museum of Ireland, Royal Irish Academy, Trinity College, Dublin. New York: The Metropolitan Museum of Art. 1977. ISBN 9780870991646.
