= Pardshaw Young Friends' Centre =

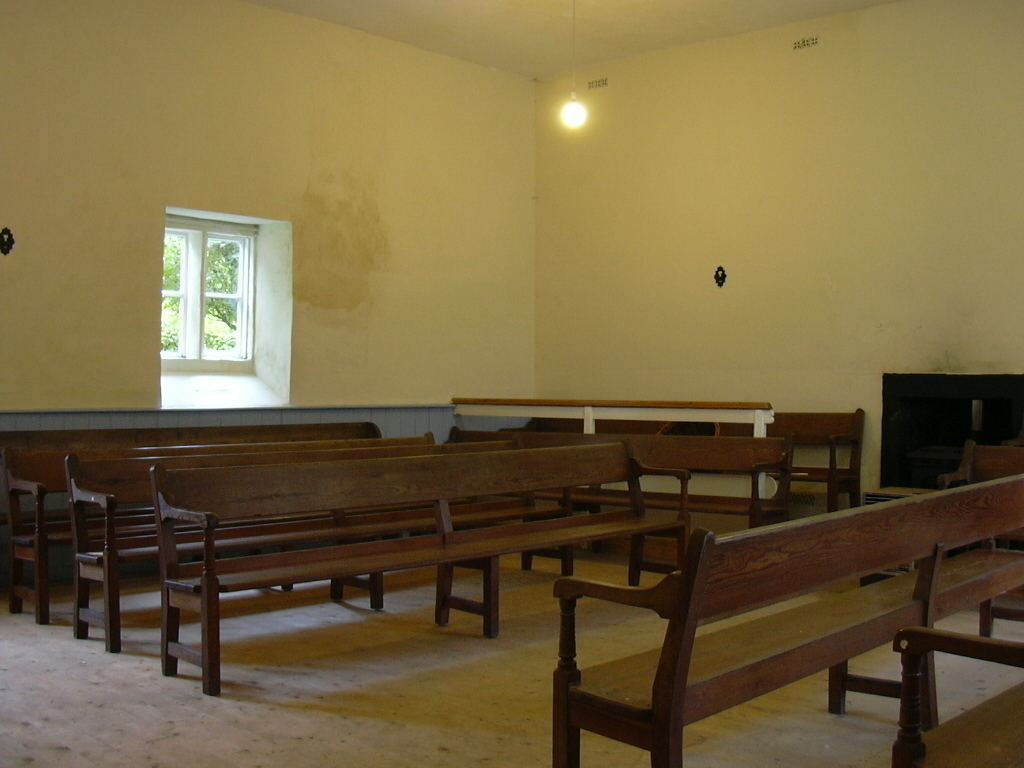
The interior of the meeting room at Pardshaw.

Pardshaw Young Friends' Centre is located within the historic Pardshaw Friends Meeting House complex, near Cockermouth in Cumbria, England. The centre provides basic accommodation and facilities for groups connected with the Religious Society of Friends and is primarily aimed at young adult Friends, known within Britain Yearly Meeting as Young Friends.

Young Friends began their association with the meeting house in the 1970s. They contributed to the maintenance of the building in annual work camps, a tradition which was still extant as of 2025. The large meeting room in the meeting house became a large very simple bunkhouse with cooking, sleeping and common room space; a shower and washing facilities were subsequently built by Young Friends in the adjacent stable block and a flush WC built at the end of the schoolroom block some time in the 1980s.

In around 2007-2008 Young Friends' General Meeting laid down the Young Friends Pardshaw Centre as an active concern, and administration of the facility passed to a small group of Friends in the local meeting continuing to offer the same very basic facilities to a broadly similar target area of users.

In the fourth month of 2018 after a Threshing Meeting held at Pardshaw Meeting House, a small group, The Pardshaw Development Group was established to develop and carry forward a vision for the Pardshaw Meeting House. In 2021 a Charitable Incorporated Organisation, "Pardshaw Quaker Centre", was established.
