= Bryan Higgins =

British philosopher

Bryan Higgins (1741 – 1818) was an Irish natural philosopher in chemistry.

He was born in Collooney, County Sligo, Ireland. His father (d. 1777) was also called Dr. Bryan Higgins. Higgins entered the University of Leiden in 1765, whence he qualified as a doctor of physics. He subsequently ran a School of Practical Chemistry at 13 Greek Street, Soho, London during the 1770s, which was patronised by the then Duke of Northumberland amongst others. He was more of a speculator than an experimenter, and published many works on chemistry and related disciplines. Joseph Priestley was an attendee of Higgins's lectures, but the two became enemies following a dispute over experiments on air (Priestley at the time was working on his six-volume tome Experiments and Observations on Different Kinds of Air).

At some point between 1780 and 1790, Higgins visited Saint Petersburg at the favour of Catherine the Great, Empress of Russia. He returned to London in January 1794 to continue his lectures at the School of Practical Chemistry.

In 1779, Higgins obtained a patent for a cheap and durable cement, "...composed of sand and lime, and a certain proportion of bone-ashes, the lime being slaked with limewater instead of common water, and the mixture made use of as rapidly as possible after being made".

In 1797, Higgins was hired by a public committee in Jamaica for the improvement of the manufacture of muscovado and rum. He resided in Jamaica from 1797 to 1799.

According to Higgins's atomic theory, central particles were surrounded by atmospheres of caloric, a model that was similar to the ideas adopted by John Dalton. It has been argued that Dalton knew of, and was influenced by, Higgins's theories, although Dalton never acknowledged Higgins's anticipation of his caloric model.

Higgins died at his estate in Walford, Staffordshire, England, in 1818.

== Published works ==
- Higgins, Bryan; (1776). A Philosophical Essay concerning Light, vol i, London.
- Higgins, Bryan; (1775 - 1776). Experiments on the Freezing of Sea Water, appended to the Hon. Duines Barrington's The probability of reaching the North Pole, 4to, London.
- Higgins, Bryan; (1780). Experiments and Observations made with the view of improving the Art of composing and applying calcareous Cements, and of preparing Quicklime. Theory of these, and Specification of the Author’s cheap and durable Cement for Building, Incrustation, or Stuccoing, and artificial Stone, London.
- Higgins, Bryan; (1786). Experiments and Observations relating to Acetous Acid, fixable Air, Dense Inflammable Air, Oils and Fuel, the Matter of Fire and Light, Metallic Reduction, Combustion, Fermentation, Putrefaction, Respiration, and other subjects of Chemical Philosophy, 1 vol, London.
- Higgins, Bryan; (1786). An analysis of the Tilbury alternative water at West Tilbury Hall, recently made at the instance of Mr. John Ellison, by Bryan Higgins, M.D. With an account of the remarkable and extraordinary cases of Mrs. Brown and Mrs. Nash, and of its efficacy in effecting their cure, London.
- Higgins, Bryan; (1788). Synopsis of the Medicinal Contents of the most noted Mineral Waters, analysed by Dr. Higgins at the instance of John Ellison, 8vo, London.
- Higgins, Bryan; (1795). Minutes of the Society for Philosophical Experiments and Conversations
- Higgins, Bryan; (1797 - 1800). Observations and Advices, 2pts., 8vo, St Jago se la Vega.
