= Leskean Cabinet =

The Leskean Cabinet is an 18th-century mineral and natural history collection conserved in the Natural History Museum in Dublin. It is a cabinet of mineralogy which was assembled by Nathaniel Gottfried Leske.

== History ==
=== Purchase ===
Early in 1792 a committee of the Royal Dublin Society was appointed to bid for the purchase of the cabinet of mineralogy assembled by Nathaniel Gottfried Leske and known as the Leskean Cabinet, then for sale. A sum of £1200 was voted for this purpose, but the total cost was about £1250. On 8 November 1792 Dr. Richard Kirwan, who had negotiated the purchase of this cabinet, reported that it was then lodged at the Society's warehouse at Poolbeg Street, then at Hawkins Street. Also curated there were the Society's collections of art, archaeology, zoological and botanical specimens.

== The collection ==
After Leske's death in 1786 his collection was systematically revised and described by Dietrich Ludwig Gustav Karsten in 1789. Richard Kirwan made further revisions in the 1790s.

The collection of 7331 mineral specimens was divided into five separate parts : —

1. External character of minerals.

2. Classification of minerals.

3. Earth's internal structure (or geological).

4. Mineralogical geography.

5. Economical mineralogy.

In addition the collection contained zoological specimens including many type specimens from the collection of Johann Friedrich Gmelin

In 1795 William Higgins was made professor of chemistry and mineralogy to the Dublin Society and the Leskean cabinet was placed under his care. It was open to students, and rules regulating admission were printed. A chemical laboratory was established, and Higgins was instructed to make experiments.

== Public exhibition ==
Part of the collection was on display along with additions in the Museum of the Dublin Society. The display was described in Wright's Historical Guide to the City of Dublin thus:- "Second Room. Here the animal kingdom is displayed, arranged in six classes. 1. Mammalia. 2. Aves. 3. Amphibia. 4. Pisces. 5. Insectae. 6. Vermes. Here is a great variety of shells, butterflies and beetles, and of the most beautiful species. The Fifth Room contains the remaining, or geological part of the original Leskean collection."
