= Nora Fisher McMillan =

Irish chonologist, naturalist, botanist and museum curator

Eleanor ('Nora') Fisher McMillan
- Born: Eleanor Fisher; 16 March 1908; Belfast, Ireland
- Died: 23 August 2003, age 95; Bromborough, Wirral
- Known for: interests in conchology and the history of natural history
- Awards: Member of the most excellent order of the British Empire (MBE) 1992; Elected a Member of the Royal Irish Academy in 1970; President Conchological Society of Great Britain and Ireland 1956 & 1957; Honorary MSc for her contribution to natural history, University of Liverpool 1991; Chrysallida macmillanae was named for her
- Scientific career
- Workplaces: Belfast Municipal Museum (1929–1933), Liverpool Museum (1933–1937, 1954–2003), University of Liverpool (1940–1956).

Eleanor Fisher (1908-2003) was an Irish chonologist, naturalist, botanist and museum curator. She become known as Nora Fisher McMillan. She was known as a larger-than-life self-taught expert in natural history, especially conchology, specialising in post-glacial fresh-water Mollusca, but with broad academic interests in the history of natural history, geology and other areas, as well as being a keen amateur botanist, naturalist and local historian. She wrote prolifically, with over 400 publications to her name.

She moved to Liverpool in 1933 and, with a short interruption due to her marriage in 1937, worked for the Liverpool Museum until her retirement in 2000 at the age of 92. By the time of her death in 2003, she had become almost the last direct link with two generations of Irish and British Victorian conchologists who brought distinction to the subject through their personal research and field collecting. Largely self-taught, she was conferred an Honorary MSc by the University of Liverpool in 1991, was President of the Conchological Society of Great Britain and Ireland, and was elected a Member of the Royal Irish Academy in 1970. She received an MBE for her life's work in 1992.

== Scientific career ==
Educated as a child in Ireland by governesses and in private schools, she was later sent to board at the Liverpool College for Girls in Huyton. Typhoid fever as a teenager terminated her formal education. However her interest in shells had been sparked by summer visits to the beach at Millisle at the age of six years and, encouraged by a family friend, H.C. Lawlor, who introduced her to the photographer and malacologist Robert Welch, she joined the Belfast Naturalists' Field Club. There her career began as a young girl in the Junior Section, where she gained a good knowledge of marine animals and flowering plants. During the 1920s her growing expertise in conchology was nurtured by Welch and other prominent members of the Field Club such as Robert Lloyd Praeger, the geologist John Kaye Charlesworth, and especially Arthur Stelfox, who was a major influence on her.

From 1929 to 1933 McMillan worked in the Belfast Municipal Museum, when she was active in working out the local distribution of plants and animals. Moving to Liverpool in 1933, she joined the staff of the Liverpool Museum, looking after the shell collection and working in particular on fossil shells. She was forced to leave in 1937 when she married William McMillan, a local dental surgeon, and from about 1938–1956 she held two part-time posts in the Geology Department and Dental School of the University of Liverpool, returning to the Liverpool Museum full-time thereafter. In 1973, by now a respected curator, researcher and author at the Liverpool Museum, she reduced to part-time and finally retired in 2000 at the age of 92, though she continued to be in demand for her expertise.

McMillan curated the British mollusca marine species collection of the Liverpool Museum from 1950 until 2000. In 1941 a fire had devastated the museum, and much was lost. Among the surviving collections were those of olive shells and netted dog whelks assembled by the conchologist, F. P. Marrat, who described many species in the 19th century, and about whom she wrote a book, Frederick Price Marrat, conchologist, Etc. in 1985. A small part of the huge H.C. Winckworth British Marine Shell Collection was also saved, and remains the major component of the British mollusca marine species collection. It was McMillan's influence which persuaded several conchologists to pass their collections to the museum, so that it once again had one of the largest regional collections, with a good representation of the popular groups. McMillan herself travelled widely in Europe, to Lake Chad in Africa, Australia and New Zealand, and went alone on a shell collecting expedition to a whaling station in the Arctic Ocean in the early 1970s.

In 2000 a species of mollusca, Chrysallida macmillanae, was named for her.

In 2001 McMillan published research into the career of naturalist Cuthbert Collingwood FLS, who worked in Liverpool in the 1850s and 1860s. The research papers about Collingwood, including correspondence with descendants of his family, are held in the University of Liverpool archives.

== Personal life ==
She was born in Belfast on 16 March 1908 as the first of Ernest and Janet Fisher's two daughters.

McMillan lived for most of her life in a bungalow, 'The Nook,' at Bromborough on the Wirral, commuting to the museum in Liverpool. Her husband died in 1954 and she stayed in the house for another half century until her death in 2003. The house backed onto Dibbinsdale nature reserve, whose flora and fauna she recorded over more than sixty years. Known by many as 'Mrs Mac,' she lived in some chaos, surrounded by heaps of papers and books on every floor, table and any other surface, and climbed over by dozens of 'rescued' stray cats. For many years she kept goats which she used to walk through the neighbourhood.

Much of her personal life was an extension of her academic interests, and she wrote prolifically on many subjects, including local history; she was a member of the Bromborough Society.

An avid collector of books relating to natural history and local history, in 1980 she presented the Zoology Library of the Natural History Museum in London with a collection of her papers.

McMillan was interviewed in 2002-3 by Julia Nunn and Peter Crowther of the Ulster Museum, about her early days in Northern Ireland. The interview appeared in Mollusc World, the newsletter of the Conchological Society of Great Britain and Ireland. Plans to interview her about her time in Liverpool were cut short by her death.

== Selected publications ==
McMillan wrote prolifically on zoology and botany as well as local history, with over 400 publications of short papers and notes in English and Irish publications. Her paper was published in 1926, in the Irish Naturalists' Journal (1:69–70) on 'Piddocks (Pholas) at Greenisland, Belfast Lough', with two further papers in the same journal in the same year 'Living sea horse (Hippocampus) at Greenisland, Belfast Lough' (1:70) and 'Helicella itala from County Down' (1:91). The following is an illustrative selection:

- On the occurrence of Pliocene shells in Wicklow (Proc. Liverpool Geol. Soc., 17, 255–266, plate), is an interesting contribution to the study of fossils in that area of Ireland.
- The Natural History of Lough Foyle, North Ireland (Proc. Royal Irish Academy, 54, 67–96), with Ranald MacDonald is a full-scale survey of that inland lake.
- James Stuart Francis Fraser Mackenzie (1845–1927) and his natural history books (Arch. Nat. Hist., 21:3, 415–416) memorialises a forgotten Colonel and botanist, one of whose books is named Wild Flowers and How to Name Them at a Glance without Botany.

Even in the late 1990s she was still submitting articles to the Irish Botanical News, in this instance about botanical books she had inherited from Arthur Wilson Stelfox, the Belfast-born architect and naturalist who wrote many papers on Botany, Malacology and entomology. Her articles referred to interesting marginalia Stelfox had added, showing her interest in the history of natural history.

She published two books: British Shells (1968), and the popular Observer's Book of Seashells of the British Isles (1977).
