= Stelfox =

Stelfox is a surname. Notable people with the surname include:

- Arthur Wilson Stelfox (1883–1972), Irish naturalist and architect
- Dawson Stelfox (born 1958), Northern Irish architect
- James Stelfox (born 1976), English musician
- Margarita Dawson Stelfox (1886–1971), Irish botanist
- Shirley Stelfox (1941–2015), English actress
