= Mary Johnstone Lynn =

Botanist (1891–1994)

- Born: 9 January 1891; Carrickfergus
- Died: after 1959; Carrickfergus
- Other name: M. J. Lynn
- Education: Queen's University Belfast
- Known for: plant ecology of tidal zones, cell biology, algology
- Scientific career
- Fields: Botany
- Thesis: The ecology of the tidal zone of Northern Ireland. (1937)

Mary Johnston(e) Lynn (9 January 1891 – died after 1959) was an Irish botanist known for her phyto-ecological studies in Northern Ireland. She taught at Queens University, Belfast and was a senior demonstrator in the botany department.Lynn was an active member of the Belfast Naturalists Field Club and the Botanical Society of Northern Ireland. She was the first to record the alga C. peregrina in Ireland.

== Early life and education ==
Lynn was born at Albany Cottage, Carrickfergus to Henry Lynn and Mary Johnstone Rodgers. She attended Queens University, Belfast for undergraduate and postgraduate studies, earning a bachelor's degree in 1914 and a doctorate in 1937. Her doctoral thesis was titled The ecology of the tidal zone of Northern Ireland.

== Career ==
Lynn taught at Queens University, Belfast. In the 1920s and 1930s, she was a senior demonstrator in the botany department. She was an active member of the Belfast Naturalists Field Club and the Botanical Society of Northern Ireland, and studied plant cell biology, including the effect of carbon dioxide and rotation on the curvature of sunflower stems. She published articles in The Irish Naturalists' Journal and The New Phytologist.

In 1934 she was the first to record the alga C. peregrina in Ireland; she also studied the scarcity of Zostera marina in Strangford Lough. James Small thanked her for help in reading the proofs of his A Textbook of Botany (1937). In 1947, she gave a lecture on seaweeds to the Belfast Naturalists Field Club. In 1949, she described "a rare form of Ascophyllum nodosum" she found at Larne Lough. She was publishing her research as late as 1960, when she updated a coastal survey of Larne Lough, and reported on the appearance of Datura stramonium in Ireland.

Algae specimens collected by Lynn were part of the Algal Herbarium at Queens University, Belfast.
