= Samuel Alexander Stewart =

American Irish botanist and geologist

Samuel Alexander Stewart (1826, Philadelphia – 1910) was an American Irish botanist and geologist.

== Life ==
Stewart was born to an Irish family in Philadelphia in 1826. He was by profession a trunk maker but his interest was in plants. His mother died in America and his father returned to Ireland in 1837.

Stewart left school at eleven initially worked with his fathers at a distillers. Eventually both of them worked in his family's trunk-making business. Whilst we worked Stewart had a very thin education from the local Sunday school.

He attended Ralph Tate's science classes from 1860 and he was a founder member of the Belfast Naturalists' Field Club. He became an assistant curator of the Belfast Natural History Society Museum Eleven years later in 1891 he was appointed Curator. He died after falling whilst crossing the road.

Samuel Alexander Stewart is best known for editing Stewart, S.A. & Corry, Thomas, Hughes. 1888 The flora of the north-east of Ireland. Corry (1860 - 1883) drowned in Lough Gill, Co. Sligo and Stewart completed the Flora alone.
