= Bann disc =

Iron Age artefact

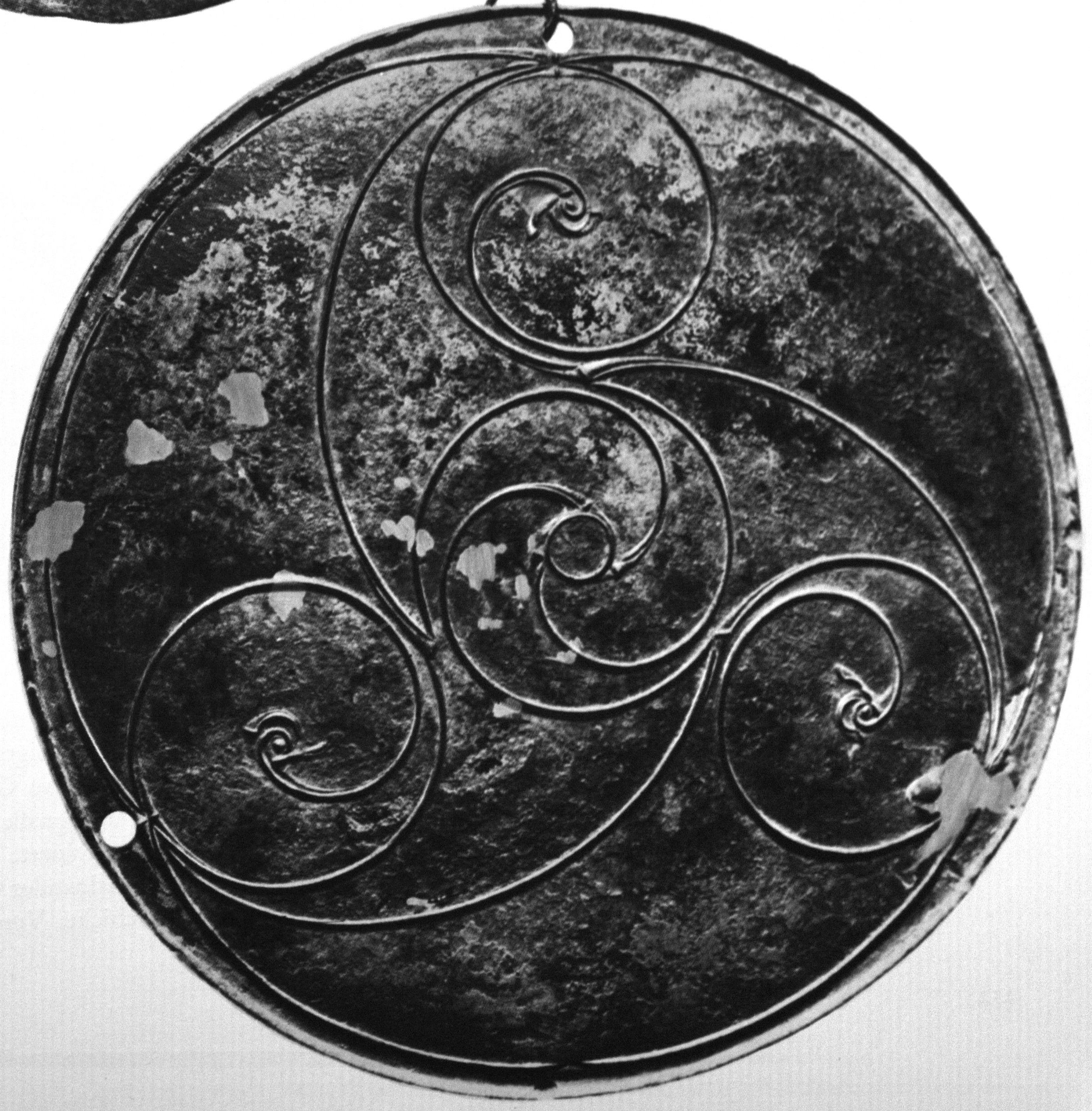
The Bann disc

The Bann disc is an Iron Age bronze artefact that was discovered in the River Bann near Coleraine, Northern Ireland, in 1939. It is a thin decorative piece emblazoned with a La Tène-style triskelion, with no obvious practical purpose. The emblem of the Coleraine Historical Society is based on the disc and its annual publication is called The Bann Disc Journal. It is currently on display in the Ulster Museum.
