= Robert Welch (photographer) =

Irish photographer (1859–1936)

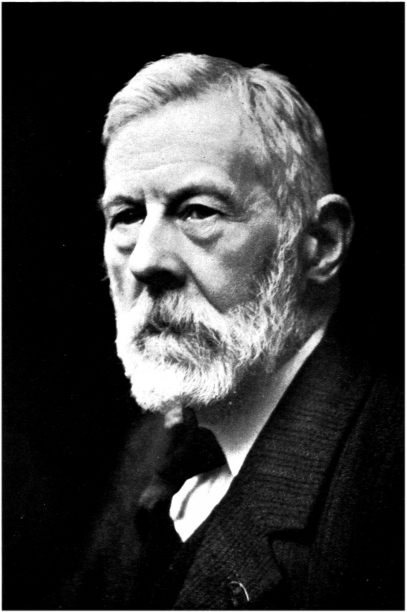
- Born: 22 July 1859; Strabane, County Tyrone, Ireland
- Died: 28 September 1936 (aged 77); Londsale Street, Belfast, County Antrim, Northern Ireland
- Known for: Photography

Robert John Welch (22 July 1859 – 28 September 1936) was an Irish photographer interested in natural history, particularly mollusca. Welch, born in Strabane, County Tyrone, lived for a time in Enniskillen. He was the son of an accomplished Scottish amateur photographer. After the death of his father, Welch established his own business in 1883 in Lonsdale Street in Belfast. Much of his time was spent taking pictures that reflected the life of the people and the contemporary landscape.

== Career ==
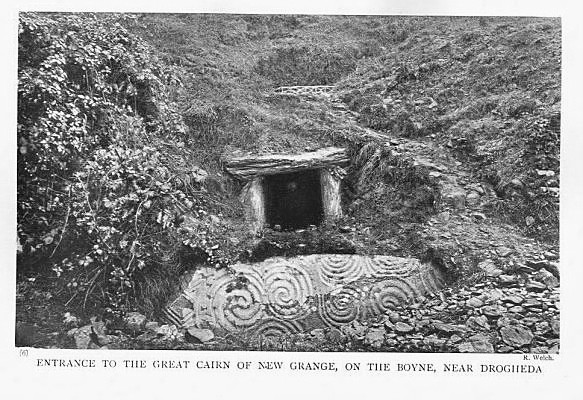
Newgrange by Robert Welch, probably about 1890

Welch specialised in outdoors photography and took thousands of photographs of the towns and scenery of Ireland. He was a craftsman and his studies of Ireland and Irish life in the late 19th and early 20th centuries are viewed as a valuable resource. Welch also took many important photographs of national monuments, megaliths and dolmens, particularly of sites such as Carrowmore, Loughcrew, the Hill of Tara and Newgrange. Welch is considered to have an excellent sense of composition often got local people or landowners to stand in his photographs as models. Welch was hired by the shipyard Harland and Wolff to take photographs of the constructions of HMHS Britannic RMS Olympic and RMS Titanic. William Alfred Green, another noted Belfast photographer, was an apprentice of Welch, and photographed many of the same subjects and sites as his mentor.

Throughout his life, Welch received numerous commendations for his works and contributions. In 1904, he was elected as a member of the Royal Irish Academy for his contributions to the field of photography. The series of photographs that Welch took of life in the West and Northwest of Ireland for the Congested Districts Board in the late 1880s, led to his being bestowed upon a royal warrant by Queen Victoria upon her visit to Ireland in 1900. This was one of four royal warrants granted to Irish photographers during her reign, making Welch one of only ten photographers outside the British Isles to receive a royal warrant. In 1923 Welch was awarded an honorary Masters of Science degree by Queen's University Belfast.

Welch's life was marked by his contributions to photography, ecology, geology, archaeology, anthropology and the environment. He served as a member and for a time, as president of both the Belfast Naturalist Field Club and the Conchological Society of Great Britain and Ireland.

When Welch died in 1936, he was remembered in obituaries written by other influential naturalists, photographers, and organisations, notably: the Ulster Tourist Development Association, Robert Lloyd Praeger, Alexander Hogg, and Arthur Stelfox. By the time of his death, Welch had taken thousands of photographs. A collection of roughly 5,000 of his glass plate negatives, lantern slides, prints, diaries, field notes and annotated maps were acquired by friends and family after his death and presented to the Belfast Museum and Art Gallery, now the Ulster Museum. A permanent exhibition at the Ulster Museum now features twenty enlarged photographs for public display. The glass negatives of the photographs Welch took for Harland & Wolff are featured in the Ulster Folk and Transport Museum.

An Ulster History Circle, also known as a Blue plaque, was unveiled in Welch's honour on the 26 March 2010, at the home in which he was born in 19-21 Main Street, Strabane, County Tyrone. Welch was also featured in an educational BBC programme, Ulster In Focus.

== Featured work ==
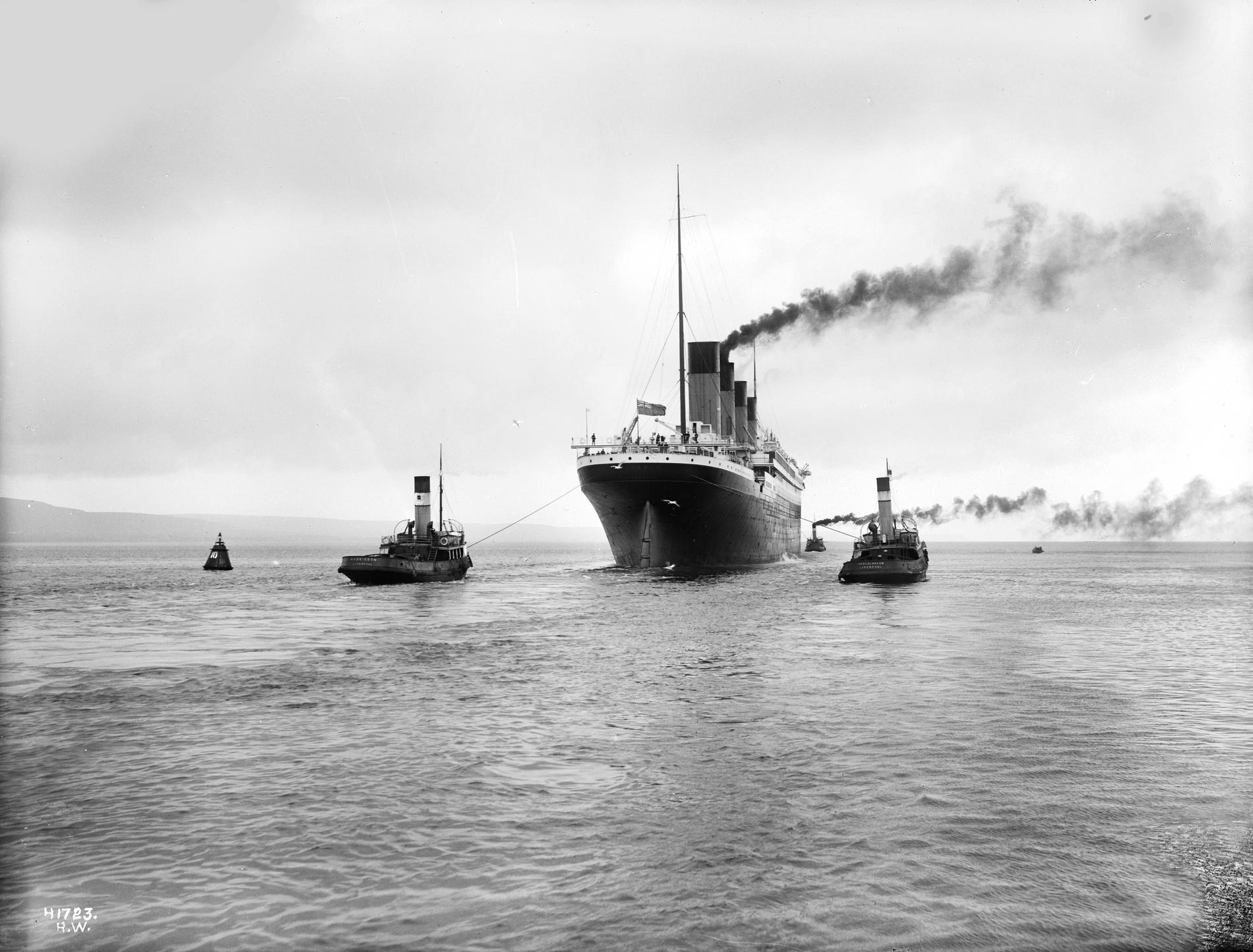
The Titanic sails through Belfast Lough by Robert Welch

Some books featuring his works and contributions include:

- Framing the west: images of rural Ireland 1891–1920
- A list of the photographs in the R.J. Welch collection in the Ulster Museum
- Ireland's eye: the photographs of Robert John Welch
- A history of the land and freshwater Mollusca of Ulster
- Official guide to County Down and the Mourne Mountains
- Sister Ships Olympic and Titanic, March 6, 1912
- Photograph album. A collection of views taken mainly in Belfast and Ulster c. 1870–c. 1890
- A list of photographs in the R.J. Welch Collection in the Ulster Museum. Vol. 2: Botany, geology, and zoology
- Praeger, Robert Lloyd, M.R.I.A. (1865–1953): collection of photographs relating to R.L. Praeger, in the Library of the Royal Irish Academy
- Album of Belfast views
- The Gobbins cliffs and caves, Co. Antrim

== Gallery ==
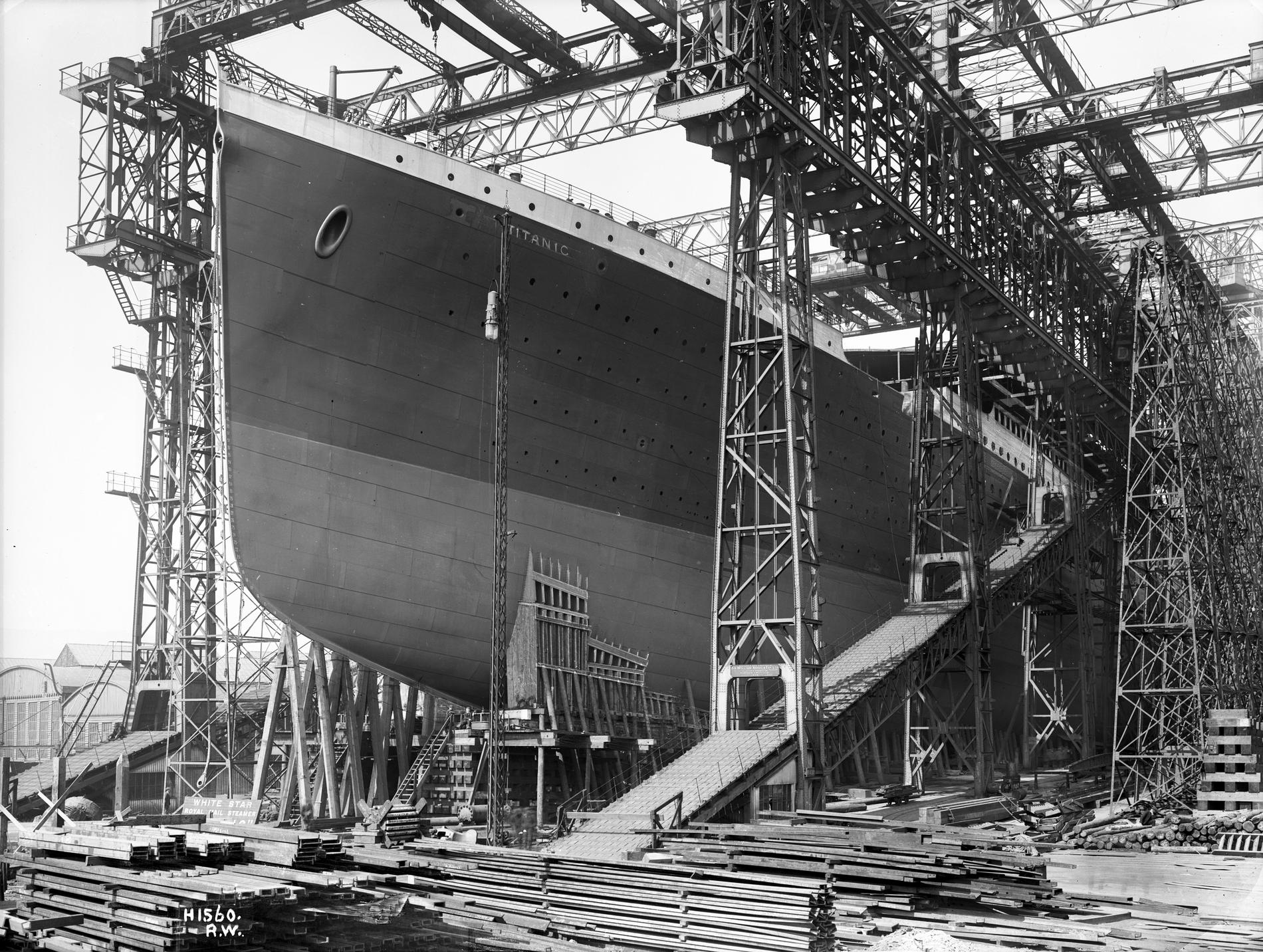
The Titanic ready for her launch, 31 May 1911

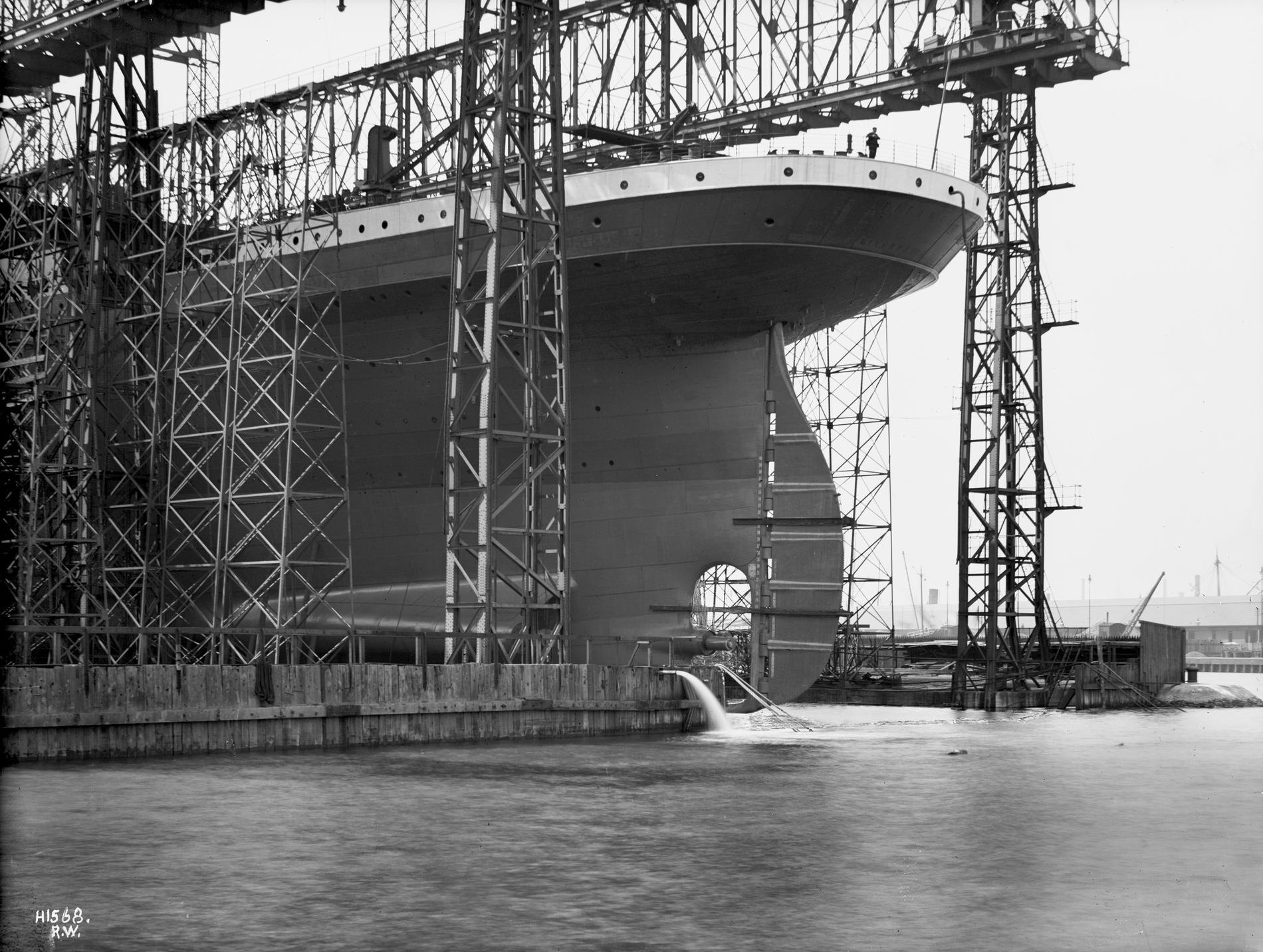
The launching of the Titanic in May 1911, by R.J. Welch

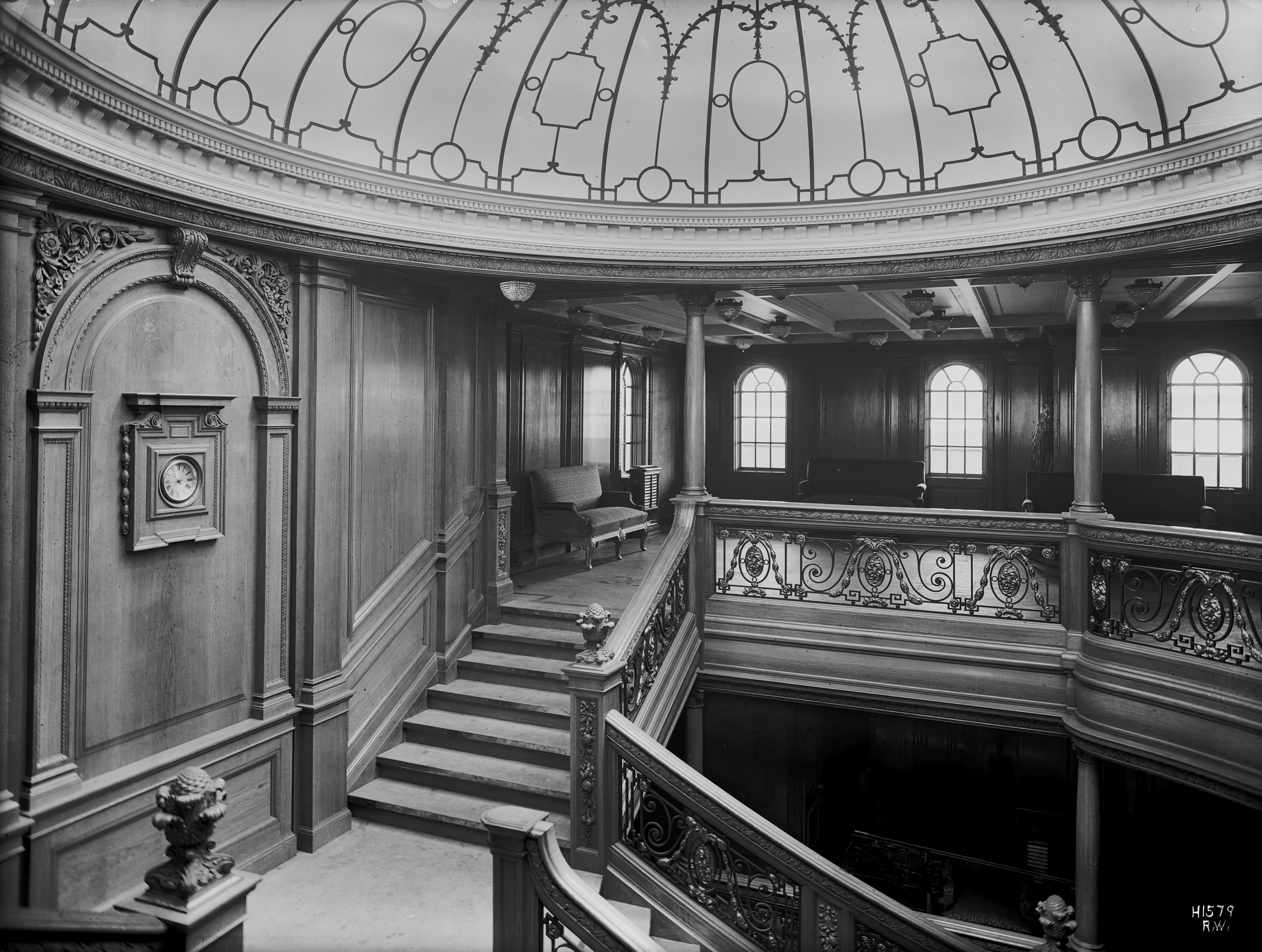
The A-Deck level of the first class aft Grand Staircase of Titanic's sister ship, the Olympic, by Welch

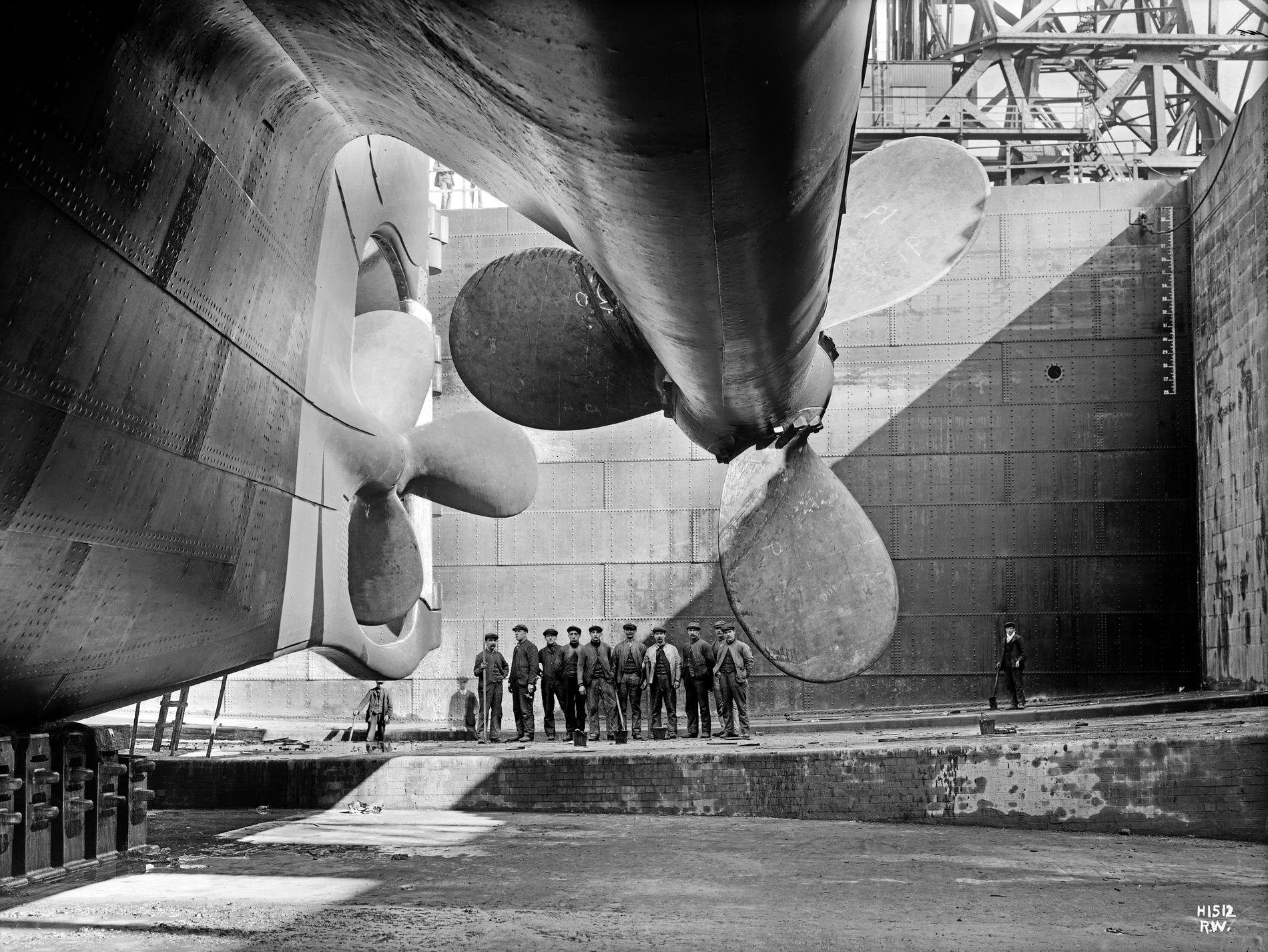
The Olympic's rudder photographed in dry dock by Welch, 1911

== Portrayals ==
- Frank Grimes (2005) - Titanic: Birth of a Legend; TV Documentary
