= James Small (botanist) =

James Small FRSE MRIA (1889–1955) was a 20th-century British botanist and botanical author.

== Life ==
He was born in Brechin on 23 March 1889 the son of William Small. He was educated at Brechin High School.

He studied pharmacy at Birkbeck College in London graduating BSc in 1913. He refused to attend the graduation ceremony on the grounds that he was a supporter of "the advanced section of suffragists" and "could not conscientiously allow myself to be presented to any member of the present Government without making a protest against the shameful treatment of those who are fighting for what is conceded on every hand to be their rights" (Birkbeck archives). In 1914 at the outbreak of the First World War he joined the Black Watch. He was injured in July 1916 and invalided out, ironically allowing him to pursue his academic aims.

In 1916 he began lecturing on Botany at Bedford College. In 1917 he began lecturing on Botany at the Pharmaceutical Society in London, obtaining a doctorate (DSc) in 1919. In 1920 he became Professor of Botany at Queen's College, Belfast.

He published two papers with a QUB graduate, Margaret Williamson Rea, in 1921 and 1927.

In 1922 he became a Member of the Royal Irish Academy. In 1926 he was elected a Fellow of the Royal Society of Edinburgh. His proposers were Sir William Wright Smith, Robert James Douglas Graham, James Robert Matthews and William Edgar Evans. He won the Society's Makdougall-Brisbane Prize for 1948–1950.

He retired in 1954 and died in Lisburn in Northern Ireland on 28 November 1955.

== Publications ==
- pH in Plants (1947)
- Modern Aspects of pH (1953)
- Application of Botany in Medicinal Plants
- Textbook of Botany
- The Secret Life of Plants
- Pocket Lens Plant Lore
- Practical Botany
- pH of Plant Cells

== Family ==
In 1917 he married Helen Pattison. They had two sons and a daughter.
