= Belfast Naturalists' Field Club =

Club of naturalists based in Belfast, Northern Ireland

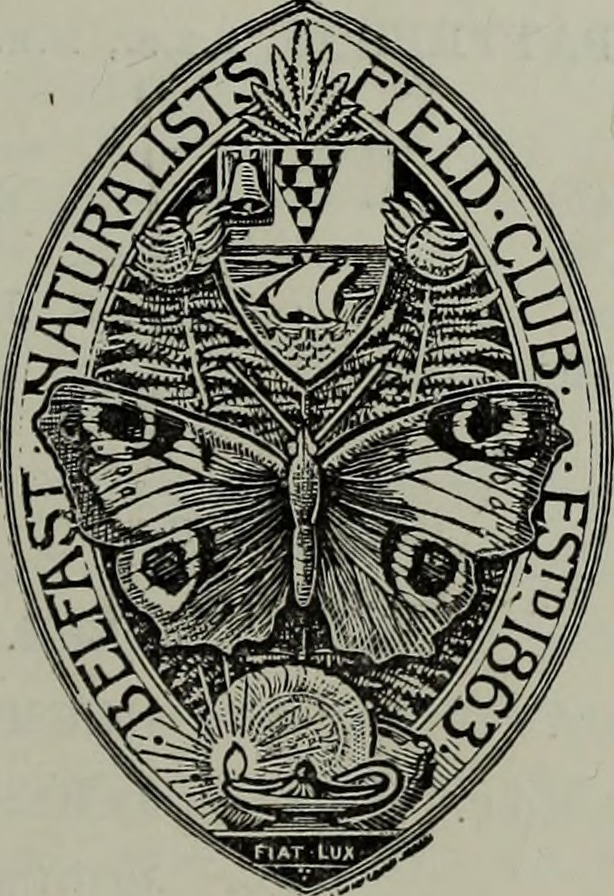
Insignia of the Belfast Naturalists' Field Club

The Belfast Naturalists' Field Club is a club of naturalists based in Belfast, Northern Ireland. Founded in 1863, the club was an important part of the education system for Victorian naturalists and worked largely through first-hand field studies.

It has been credited with playing an important role in the elucidation of glacial and post-glacial sea levels, climates and fossil beaches and issuing the first of the regional handbooks for meetings of the British Association for the Advancement of Science as far back as 1874.

The club has four sections, Archeology & History, Botany, Geology and Zoology, and has published several books and a periodical. The Herbarium of the BNFC is now in the Ulster Museum.

== History ==
The club was formed as the first of a series of Field Clubs (followed by those in Dublin (1886), Cork (1892), and Limerick (1892)) established in response to the increasing interest in natural sciences in the Victorian Society of Ireland. Ralph Tate visited Belfast to give a series of lectures on botany which stimulated Samuel Alexander Stewart to gather a group of field botanists.

The first public meeting was held on the March 6, 1863 in the Museum Buildings, now the Ulster Museum. Tate wrote a draft constitution. The first field trip organized by the club occurred on 6 April 1863 when 88 members travelled to Islandmagee to collect fossils. Since then, members of the club have visited many areas including the Cavehill, the Giant's Causeway, Mount Stewart and Strangford Lough to name but a few.

=== Books ===
- Systematic Lists Illustrative of the Flora, Fauna, Palaeontology and Archeology of the North of Ireland, 1870
- Guide to Belfast and the adjacent counties, 1874
- Catalogue of a Collection of Irish Antiquities, 1874
- A Guide to Belfast and the Counties of Down & Antrim, 1902
- A Preliminary Report on the Survey of the County Armagh Flora, 1965-1967, 1968
- Urban Flora of Belfast: A project of the Belfast Naturalists' Field Club. 1997, by Stan Beesley, John Wilde.

=== Periodicals ===
- Annual Report and Proceedings of the Belfast Naturalists' Field Club
- The Irish Naturalists' Journal (contributor/coauthor)

=== Notable members ===
- John Kaye Charlesworth (1889–1972), geologist
- Richard Hayward (1892–1964), actor
- Mary Johnstone Lynn (1891–1959), botanist
- Margaret Williamson Rea (1875–1954), botanist
- Robert Lloyd Praeger (1865–1953), naturalist
- Arthur Wilson Stelfox (1883–1972), naturalist
- Margarita Dawson Stelfox (1886–1971), botanist

== Further references ==
- Scott, R. 2004. Wild Belfast on Safari in the City. The Blackstaff Press, Belfast. ISBN 0-85640-762-3.
- Crowther, Peter. 2013. Citizen Science 150 years of the Belfast Naturalists' Field Club. National Museums Northern Ireland. ISBN 090076158X
