= Margaret Williamson Rea =

Irish botanist

- Born: 1875; Belfast, County Antrim, Ireland
- Died: 17 April 1954

Margaret Williamson Rea (1875 – 17 April 1954) was an Irish botanist. She graduated from Queen's University Belfast with an M.Sc. in 1921. She worked with professors James Small and R. H. Yapp, publishing a number of papers in the New Phytologist and Protoplasma, and also collaborated at least once with Margarita D. Stelfox. Rea specialised in the collection and description of Mycetozoa.

== Life ==
Margaret Williamson Rea was born in Belfast in 1875, the eldest daughter of Robert and Eleanor Rea. She studied at Queen's University Belfast (QUB), graduating with a B.Sc. in 1919, followed by an M.Sc. in 1921. She published a number of papers in the New Phytologist and Protoplasma, two co-authored with Prof. James Small; another was based on her masters thesis, Stomata and Hydathodes in Campanula rotundifolia L., and their Relations to Environment, and in it she acknowledges Professor R. H. Yapp, "at whose suggestion the work was commenced". (Note: Yapp was Chair of Botany at QUB from 1914 to 1919.) She also co-authored at least one paper with Margarita D. Stelfox. She specialised in the collection and description of Mycetozoa, recording a number of her records in the Irish Naturalists' Journal. Some specimens collected by Rea are held in the National University of Ireland, Galway. Others form part of the Stelfox Collection in the herbarium of the Ulster Museum.

She joined the Belfast Naturalists' Field Club in 1907 (Note: Lily Curry Rea (her younger sister?), also of Salem House, joined in 1916.) and in 1918/1919, when her address was given as Salem House, Sydenham, Belfast, was one of its two secretaries, alongside Dr. (later Professor) J. K. Charlesworth of QUB. In the 1924 membership list of the British Mycological Society, which she joined in 1920, her address was again given as Salem House. She died suddenly in hospital, on 17 April 1954.
