= Arthur Wilson Stelfox =

Irish hymenopterist and naturalist, and architect

- Born: Arthur Wilson Stelfox; 15 December 1883; Belfast, Ireland
- Died: 19 May 1972 (aged 88); Newcastle, County Down, Northern Island
- Spouse: Margarita Dawson Mitchell Stelfox (m. 1914)
- Children: George Stelfox
- Awards: Honorary Fellow of the Linnaen Society
- Scientific career
- Fields: Natural history, Architecture

Arthur Wilson Stelfox (15 December 1883–19 May 1972) was an Irish naturalist and architect. Stelfox was a recognised authority on Hymenoptera and on non-marine Mollusca especially the genus Pisidium. He also made important contributions to scientific knowledge concerning Irish botany and on identifying and describing remains from prehistoric sites in Ireland.

== Early years and education ==
Stelfox was born in Belfast on 15 December 1883 the son of Jennie McIlwaine and James Stelfox. He was educated at Campbell College, Belfast and went on to study architecture in Ireland and England, being elected as an associate of the Royal Institute of British Architects on the 2 November 1908.

Stelfox was an enthusiastic naturalist from his youth, encouraged by his father, who belonged to the Belfast Naturalists' Field Club and by Robert John Welch with whom he would later collaborate. His earliest known specimens are now held in the National Museums Liverpool and were collected in 1898 when he was 15 years of age.

== Marriage ==
It was not until 1903 that Stelfox became an official member of the Belfast Naturalists' Field Club and in 1908 he was appointed the Honourable Secretary. In 1909 his future wife Margarita Mitchell was asked to assist him in this role. Mitchell was a talented naturalist in her own right and did valuable work in conjunction with Margaret Williamson Rea on Mycetozoa. Stelfox and Mitchell married in 1914. The couple subsequently had three children but their daughter and youngest son died in childhood.

In October 1925, the couple jointly found the first confirmed record of the rare slime mold Diderma lucidum in Ireland, at Powerscourt Waterfall. In 1947, they found the first occurrence of the alpine myxomycete Lepidoderma carestianum in the British Isles, at Ben Lawers; the specimen was not identified until 1965.

== Natural History career ==
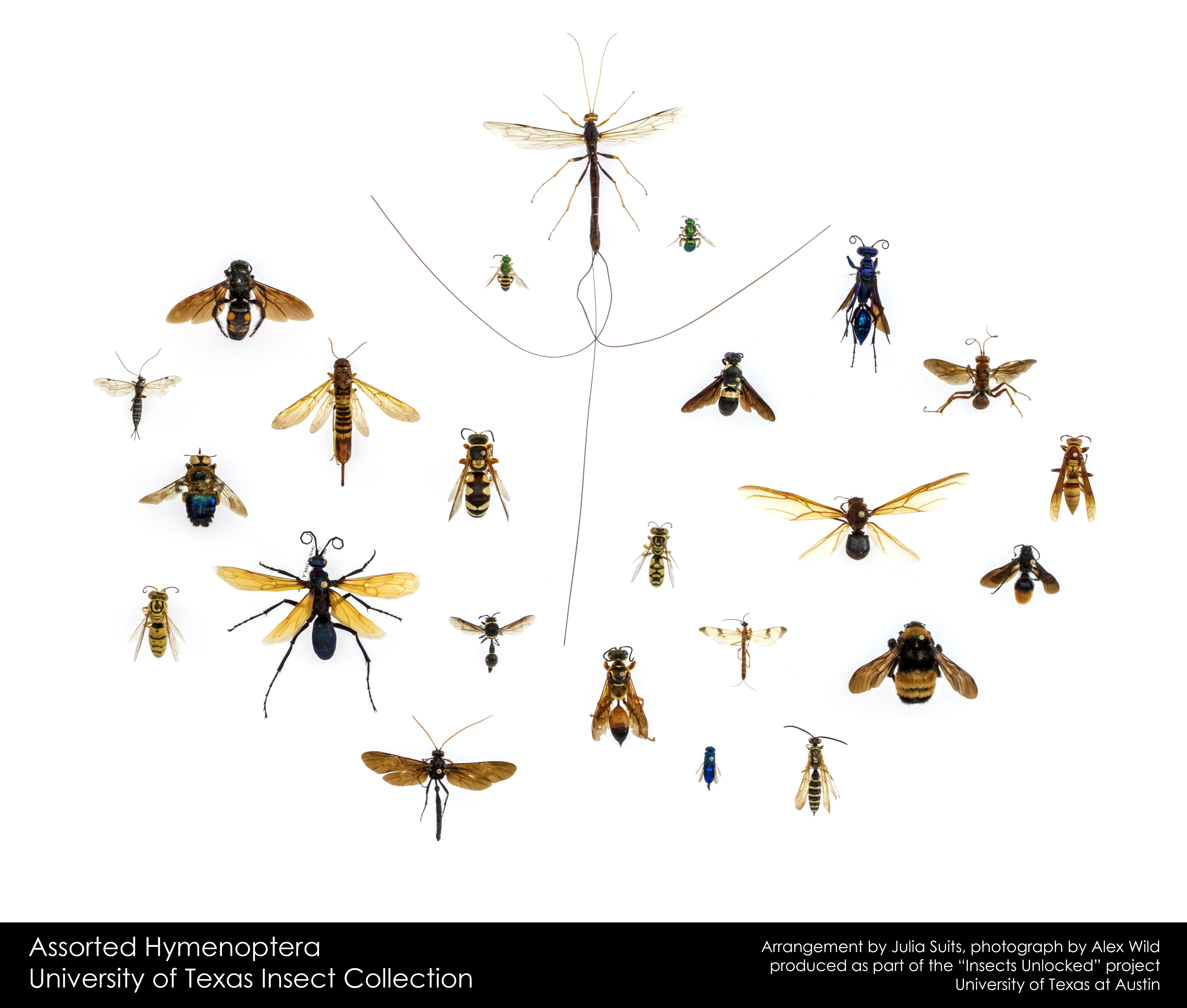
Assorted Hymenoptera. Arranged by Julia Suits, photographed by Alex Wild; Produced as part of the Insects Unlocked Project at The University of Texas at Austin.

Around 1908, amongst other work, Stelfox assisted with the Clare Island Survey, visiting the Island and the surrounding area on numerous occasions, researching and writing the section of the Survey Report on non-marine mollusks. In 1911 he published a paper in the Proceedings of the Royal Irish Academy and next year he was elected a member of that Academy. One of Stelfox's most influential papers on Mollusca was on the Pisidium fauna of the Grand Junction Canal which was published in 1918. This was regarded by Arthur Erskine Ellis as having "revolutionised the hitherto very unsatisfactory treatment of the genus...".

However it was not until 1920 that Stelfox was able to make a living from his passion when he obtained employment at the National Museum of Ireland. He was appointed as Assistant Naturalist and specialized in Hymenoptera. Stelfox recognised the enormous value of the Alexander Henry Haliday Hymenoptera collection held at the National Museum of Ireland and undertook the task of curating and caring for it. In doing so he added significantly to the scientific knowledge of many species by ensuring the correct identification and labelling of specimens and the cross referencing of Haliday's notes. Despite this specialization Stelfox proved his standing as a naturalist by publishing papers on a total nine Orders of insects and was regarded as an authority on molluscs, Irish plants and other aspects of natural history.

From 1924 Stelfox and his assistant Eugene O'Mahony were solely responsible for the Museum's zoological collections. As a result, he was often called upon to identify remains uncovered from prehistoric sites across Ireland and undertook a serious amount of work that informed scientists of the ecology in Ireland over 1000 years prior. During this time Stelfox also continued to make significant contributions to the scientific knowledge on Irish flora and fauna by describing many new species. In his free time he continued to undertake field trips adding to his significant personal collections of mollusks and insects.

Despite his scholarship Stelfox refused offers of Honorary Doctorates but in 1947 was elected as an Honorary Fellow of the Linnean Society. In 1948 Stelfox retired from his position at the National Museum of Ireland but continued to undertake numerous field trips and collect plants, molluscs and insects.

== Stelfox's collections ==
In 1951 he donated his collection of Pisidium molluscs to Rev H. B. Herrington who subsequently gave it to the Museum of Zoology, University of Michigan. His enormous collection of over 90,000 specimens of Hymenoptera along with the majority of his field books were donated to the Smithsonian Institution in 1966. This collection was regarded by Dr K. V. Krombein as "The largest and most complete collection of Irish Hymenoptera ever made". Other scientifically and historically significant documents are held by Dr. Michael P. Kerney of the British Museum, Nora Fisher McMillan of the National Museums Liverpool and Stelfox's family.

The Stelfox Collection at the Ulster Museum includes his vascular plants, as well as Myxomycete collected by his wife Margarita, and her associate Margaret Williamson Rea.

== Death ==
Stelfox died in hospital after a short illness on 19 May 1972; his wife having predeceased him in August the year prior.

== Taxa named in Stelfox's honour ==
Several taxa have been named in Stelfox's honour including Heterospilus stelfoxi a species of parasitoid wasp.

== Publications ==
Stelfox published a significant number of scientific papers during his lifetime. A few highlights include

- A List of Land and Freshwater Molluscs of Ireland. Proc. R. Ir. Acad., 29: 65-164
- Mollusca - Land and Fresh Water (Clare Island Survey). Proc. R. Ir. Acad., 31: (Sect. 2.; Pt. 23.) 1-64
- Researches into the hereditary characters of some of our British Mollusca. J. Conchol., 15: 268-275
- A List of the Hymenoptera aculeata of Ireland Proc. R. Ir. Acad., 37: 201-355
- Description of six new species of Bassine Ichneumon flies Proc. R. Ir. Acad., 46: 109-119
- Description of five new species of Alysiidae (Hymenoptera). Proc. R. Ir. Acad., 47: 1-16
- The species of the genus Eclytus so far found in Ireland (Hymenoptera: Ichneumonidae). Proc. R. Ir. Acad., 64: 509-511
- (With Kuiper, McMillan and Mitchell) The Late Glacial and Post-Glacial Mollusca of the White Bog, Co Down. Proc. R. Ir. Acad., 72: 185-207
