= Margarita Dawson Stelfox =

Irish botanist

Margarita Dawson Stelfox ARCScI
- Born: Margarita Dawson Mitchell; 1886; Lisburn, Ireland
- Died: 1971 (aged 84–85)
- Education: Royal College of Science, Dublin, Chemistry, 1908
- Known for: Botanist
- Spouse: Arthur Wilson Stelfox (m. 1914)
- Children: George Stelfox
- Awards: Dunville Studentship, 1912

Margarita Dawson Stelfox ARCScI (1886–1971) was an Irish botanist, specialising in Mycetozoa.

== Life ==
Margarita Dawson Stelfox was born Margarita Dawson Mitchell in 1886 in Lisburn to Elizabeth (née Pounden) and the Rev. George P. Mitchell. She studied chemistry at the Royal College of Science, Dublin, the only woman in her class, and graduated in 1908. She spent a year teaching in Waterford before returning to Belfast to take up a post at Victoria College. She continued to teach there part time, once she became a student of botany at the newly constituted The Queen's University of Belfast, from which graduated with honours in 1912, having won the Dunville Studentship.

She joined the Belfast Naturalists' Field Club in 1909, where she met Arthur Wilson Stelfox—in the year 1911/1912, the pair were listed as the club's joint honorary secretaries. They married in 1914. During their engagement, she was offered a teaching post at The Queen's University, but declined it due to her impending marriage. The couple had three children, two sons and a daughter. One son and their daughter died in childhood.

During World War I the couple worked as fruit-growers in Ballymagee, County Down. They moved to Dublin in 1920, when her husband was offered the job of assistant naturalist in the Natural History Museum there. The family home was on Clareville Road, Harold's Cross. In the early 1920s, with her husband as collaborator, she produced a textbook for primary schools, The National Programme of Rural Science or Nature Study, published by the Educational Company of Ireland. In October 1925, the couple jointly found the first confirmed record of the rare slime mold Diderma lucidum in Ireland, at Powerscourt Waterfall. In 1947 they found the first occurrence of the alpine myxomycete Lepidoderma carestianum in the British Isles, at Ben Lawers; the specimen was not identified until 1965.

He recognised her knowledge, and in 1941 wrote:

That an ant not previously recorded from Ireland should enter the house of one of the few people in the country who would recognise it seems a very remote possibility, yet on the 17th September 1941, such a coincidence happened ... (bringing in the washing after a warm day) my wife found, wrapped in a handkerchief, a small winged hymenopteron, which on examination proved to be a female of the ant.Ponera punctatissima Roger. not previously found in Ireland.

After her husband's 1948 retirement they moved to Newcastle, County Down.

She was one of the few Irish botanists of her time who specialised in Mycetozoa. She collaborated with Margaret Williamson Rea, co-authoring at least one paper with her. Specimens collected by the two women form part of the Stelfox Collection in the herbarium of the Ulster Museum. She also corresponded with Gulielma Lister.

After several months of illness, Margarita Stelfox died on 13 August 1971; her husband died eight months later.
