= Ulster Museum =

Museum in Northern Ireland

Coordinates: 54.582°N 5.935°W

- Músaem Uladh
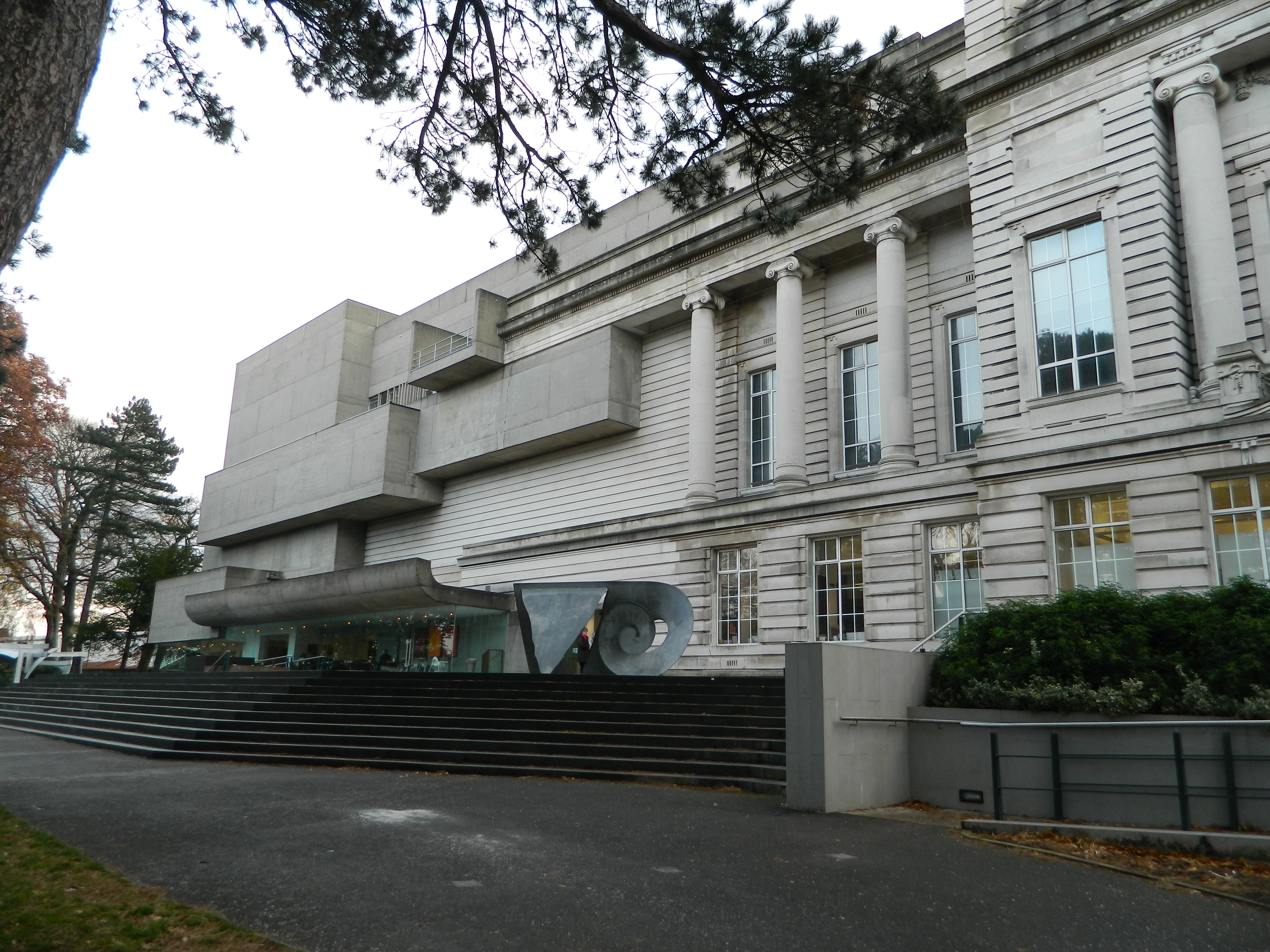
- Ulster Museum exterior, 2013
- Former name: Belfast Municipal Museum and Art Gallery
- Established: 1929
- Location: Belfast, Northern Ireland
- Type: Multidisciplinary museum
- Visitors: 485,808 (2025)
- Executive director: Kathryn Thomson
- Chairperson: Gordon Milligan OBE
- Architect: James Cumming Wynnes (Original building); Francis Pym (Brutalist extension)
- Website: www.nmni.com/our-museums/ulster-museum/

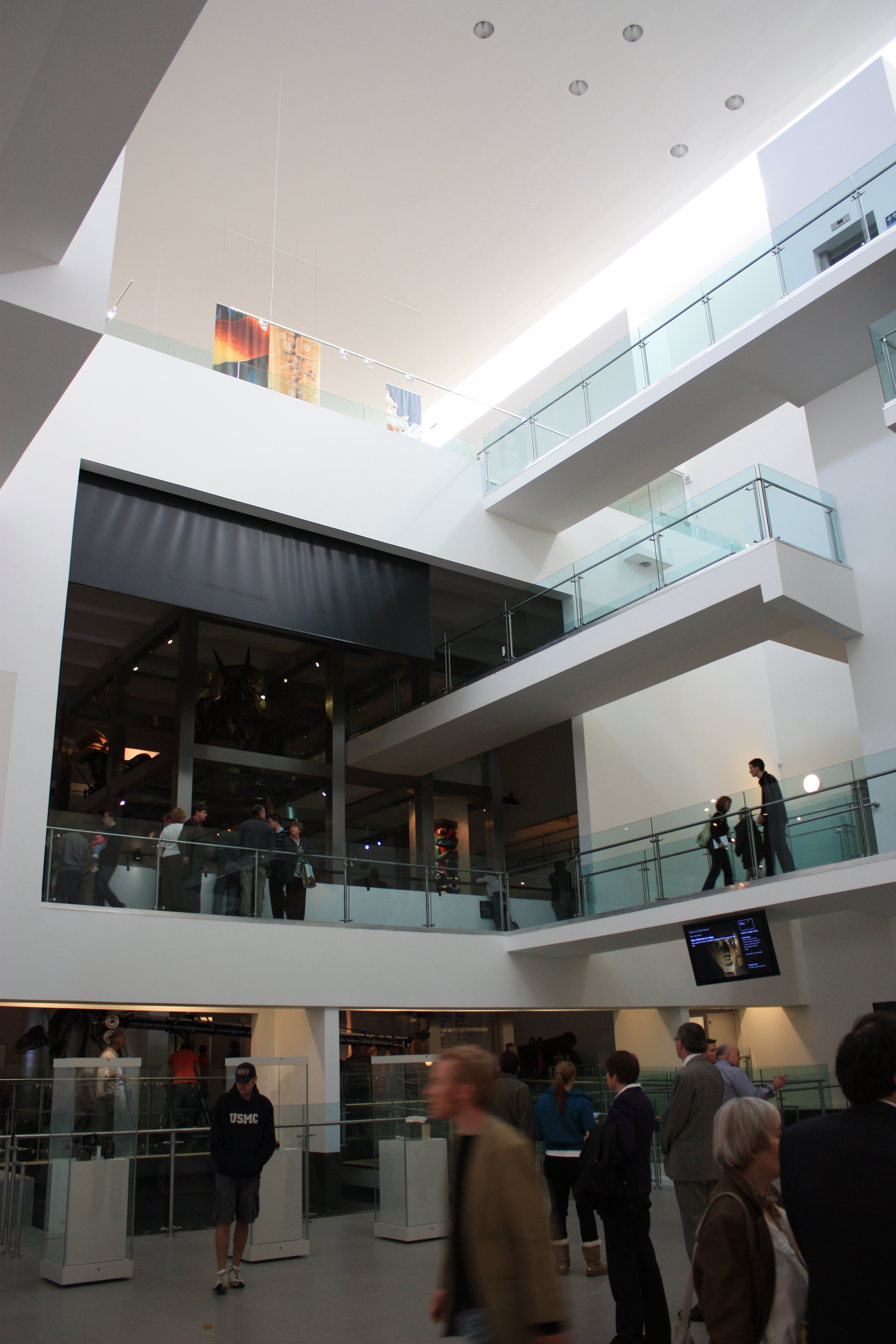
The Ulster Museum's main hall, on reopening after its refurbishment in October 2009

The Ulster Museum, located in the Botanic Gardens in Belfast, has around 8,000 square metres (90,000 sq. ft.) of public display space, featuring material from the collections of fine art and applied art, archaeology, ethnography, treasures from the Spanish Armada, local history, numismatics, industrial archaeology, botany, zoology and geology. It is the largest museum in Northern Ireland, and one of the components of National Museums Northern Ireland.

== History ==
The Ulster Museum was founded as the Belfast Natural History Society in 1821 and began exhibiting in 1833. It has included an art gallery since 1890. Originally called the Belfast Municipal Museum and Art Gallery, in 1929, it moved to its present location in Stranmillis. The new building was designed by James Cumming Wynne.

In 1962, courtesy of the Museum Act (Northern Ireland) 1961, it was renamed as the Ulster Museum and was formally recognised as a national museum. A major extension constructed by McLaughlin & Harvey Ltd to designs by Francis Pym who won the 1964 competition was opened in 1972 and Pym's only completed work. It was published in several magazines and was until alteration the most important example of Brutalism in Northern Ireland. It was praised by David Evans for the "almost barbaric power of its great cubic projections and cantilevers brooding over the conifers of the botanic gardens like a mastodon".

Since the 1940s the Ulster Museum has built up a good collection of art by modern Irish, and particularly Ulster-based artists.

In 1998, the Ulster Museum merged with the Ulster Folk and Transport Museum and the Ulster-American Folk Park to form the National Museums and Galleries of Northern Ireland.

In July 2005, a £17m refurbishment of the museum was announced, with grants from the Heritage Lottery Fund and the Department of Culture, Arts and Leisure (DCAL, usually pronounced as 'Dee-Kal'). In October 2006 the museum closed its doors until 2009, to allow for the work. Illustrations of historic interest of interiors before alterations will be found as nos 183 and 237 in Larmour, P. 1987. The redevelopment drew criticism from many significant figures in the architectural community and the Twentieth Century Society, especially for changes to the Brutalist character and dismantling of the spiral sequence of rooms in the Pym extension.

The museum reopened in October 2009, eighty years to the day since its original opening. Within a month over 100,000 people had visited the museum. The reopening saw the introduction of Monday closure, which has received criticism from the public and in the press. All NMNI sites are to close on Mondays. This decision is being reviewed by DCAL.

== Collections ==
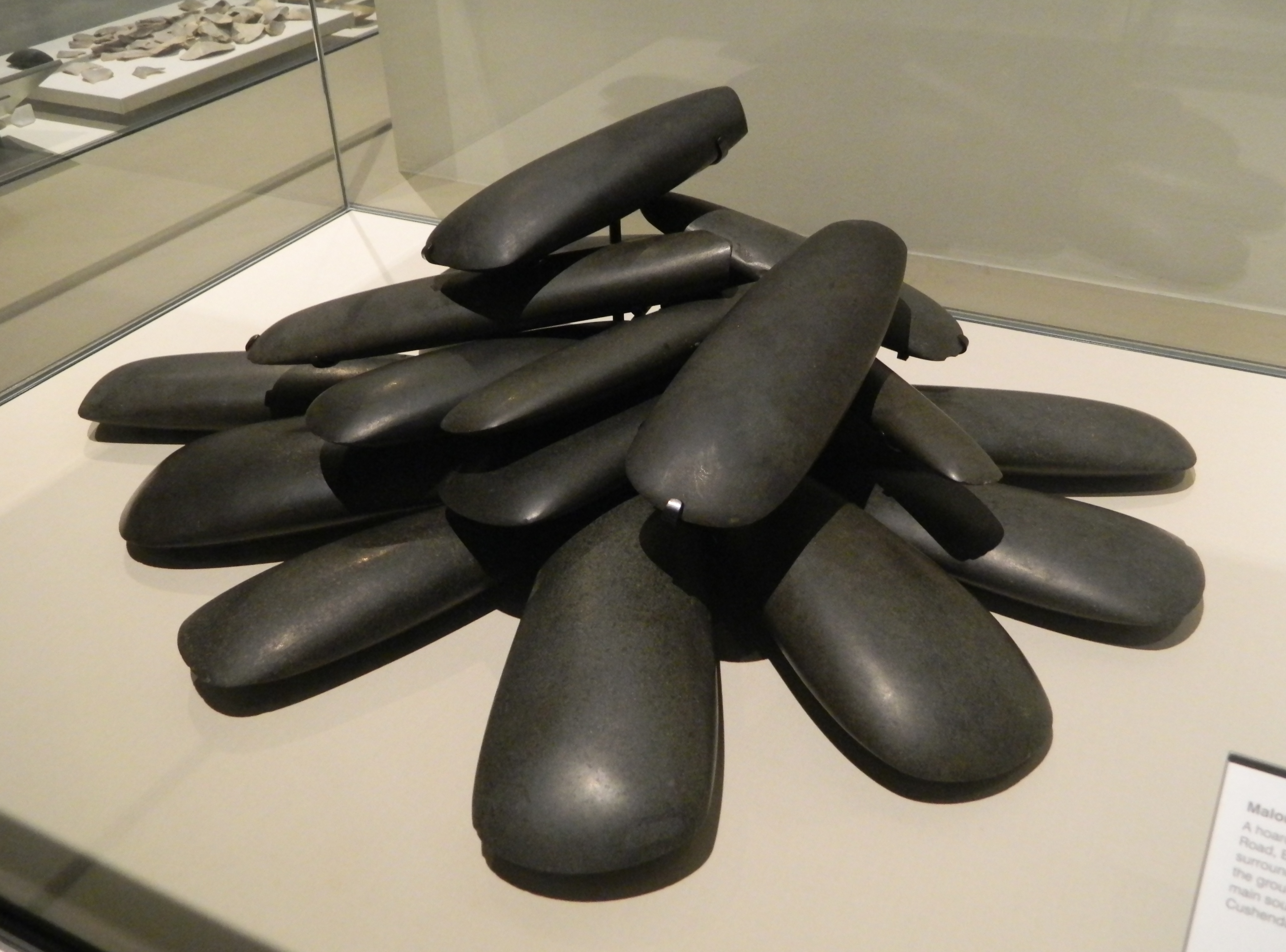
The Malone Hoard of 19 polished Neolithic axe heads

The museum has galleries covering the history of Northern Ireland from the earliest times to the very recent past, collections of art, mostly modern or ethnographic, historic and contemporary fashion and textiles, and also holds exhibitions.

The scientific collections of the Ulster Museum contain important collections of Irish birds, mammals, insects, molluscs, marine invertebrates, flowering plants, algae and lichens, as well as an archive of books and manuscripts relating to Irish natural history. The museum also maintains a natural history website named Habitas. In the late 1980s and the early 1990s it had a permanent exhibition on dinosaurs which has since been scaled back considerably. There is also a collection of rocks, minerals and fossils. It is also home to Ireland’s only known dinosaur fossil bones.

=== Irish archaeology ===
The museum contains significant finds from Northern Ireland, although in earlier periods these were often sent to the British Museum or later Dublin, as with the Broighter Hoard, now in the National Museum of Ireland. Objects in the museum include the Malone Hoard of 19 polished Neolithic axe heads, the Moss-side Hoard of Mesolithic stone tools, the important Downpatrick Hoard of Bronze Age gold jewellery, part of the Late Roman Coleraine Hoard, the Viking Shanmullagh Hoard, and the medieval coins in the Armagh City Hoard and Armagh Castle Street Hoard.

There are other significant objects of the Bronze Age gold jewellery for which Ireland is notable, including four of the 100-odd surviving gold lunulae, and some important early Celtic art, including a decorated bronze shield found in the River Shannon, and the Bann disc, bronze with triskele decoration.

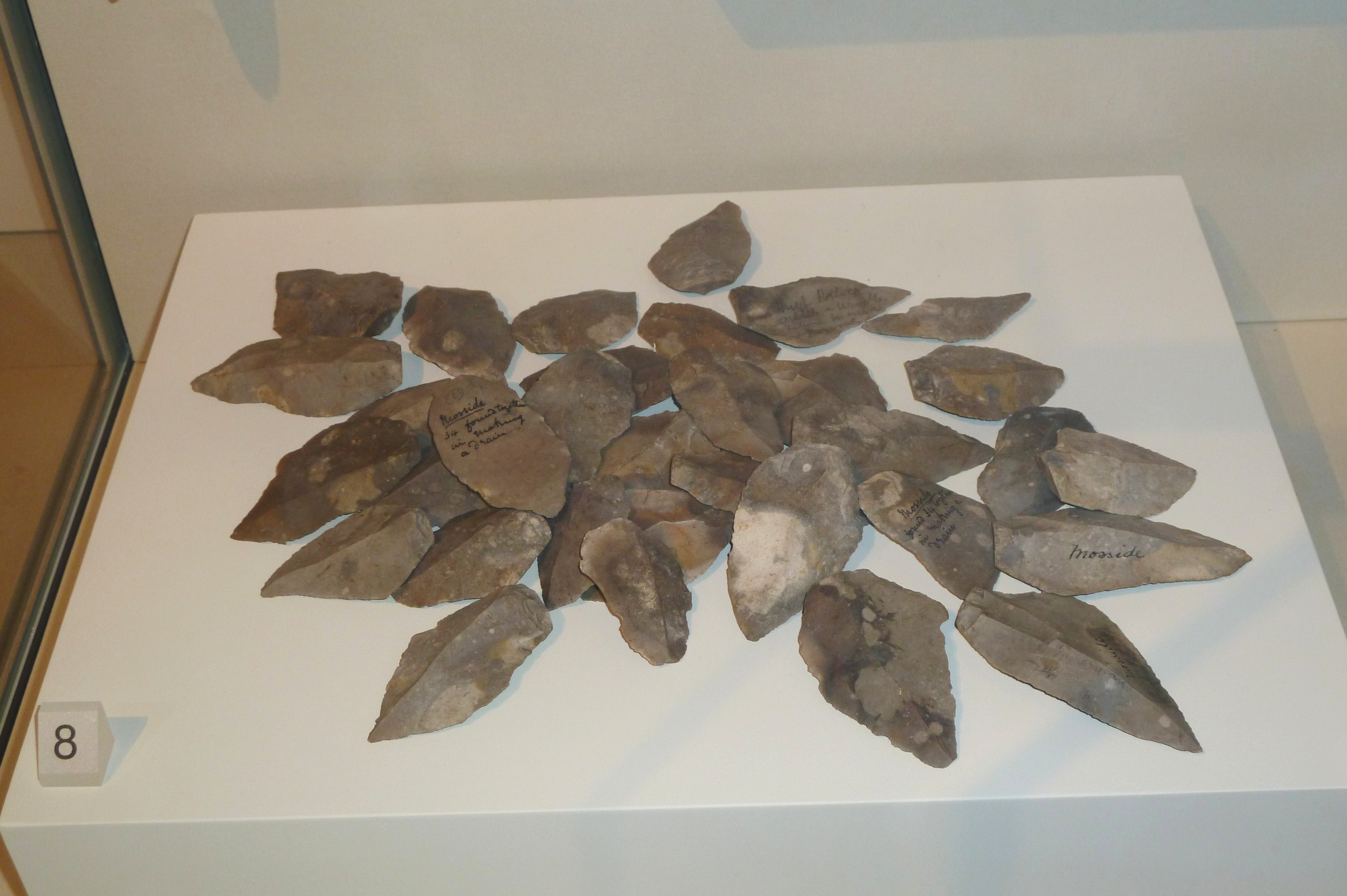
The Moss-side Hoard of Mesolithic stone tools

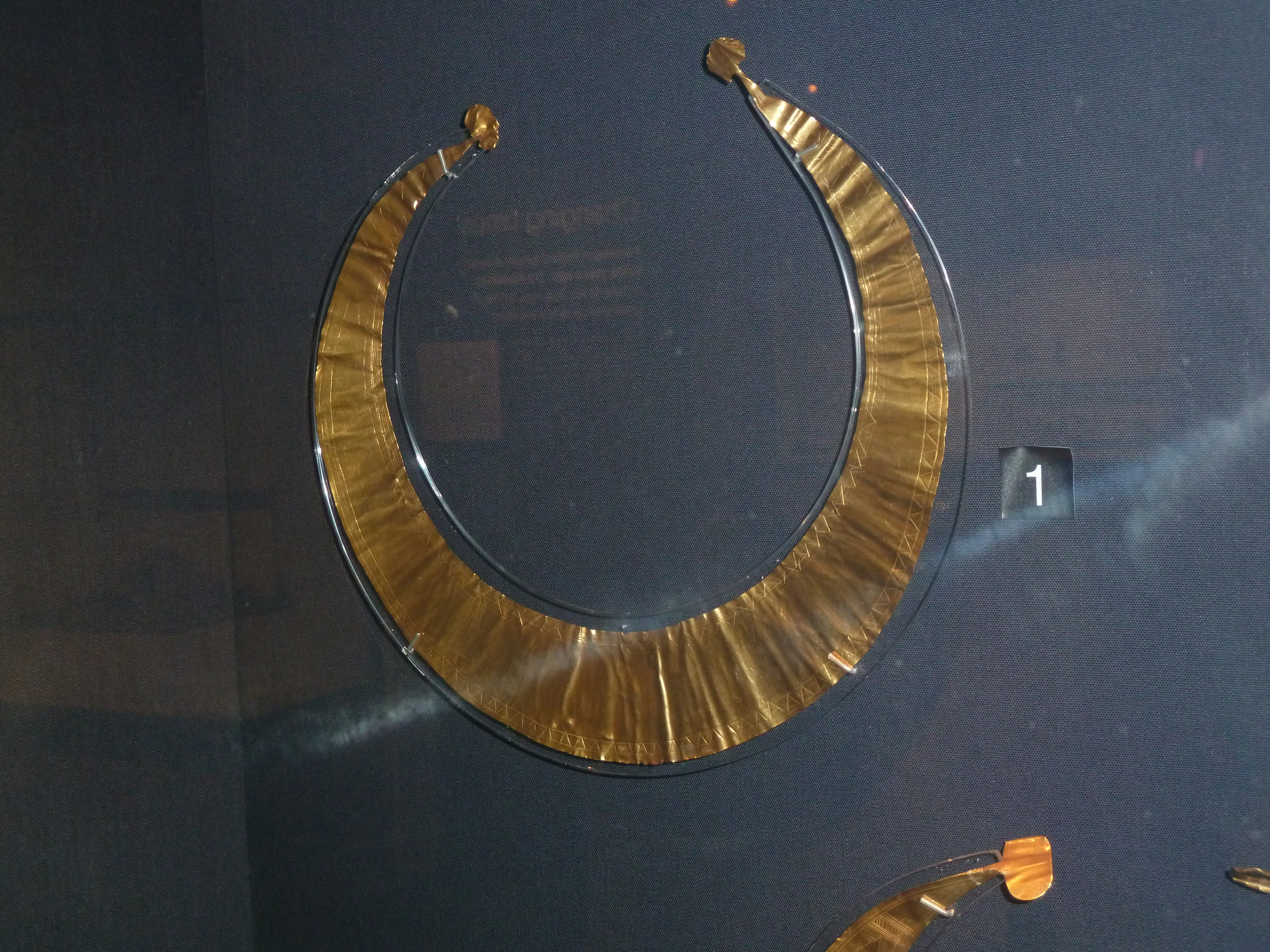
Gold lunula from Ballybay

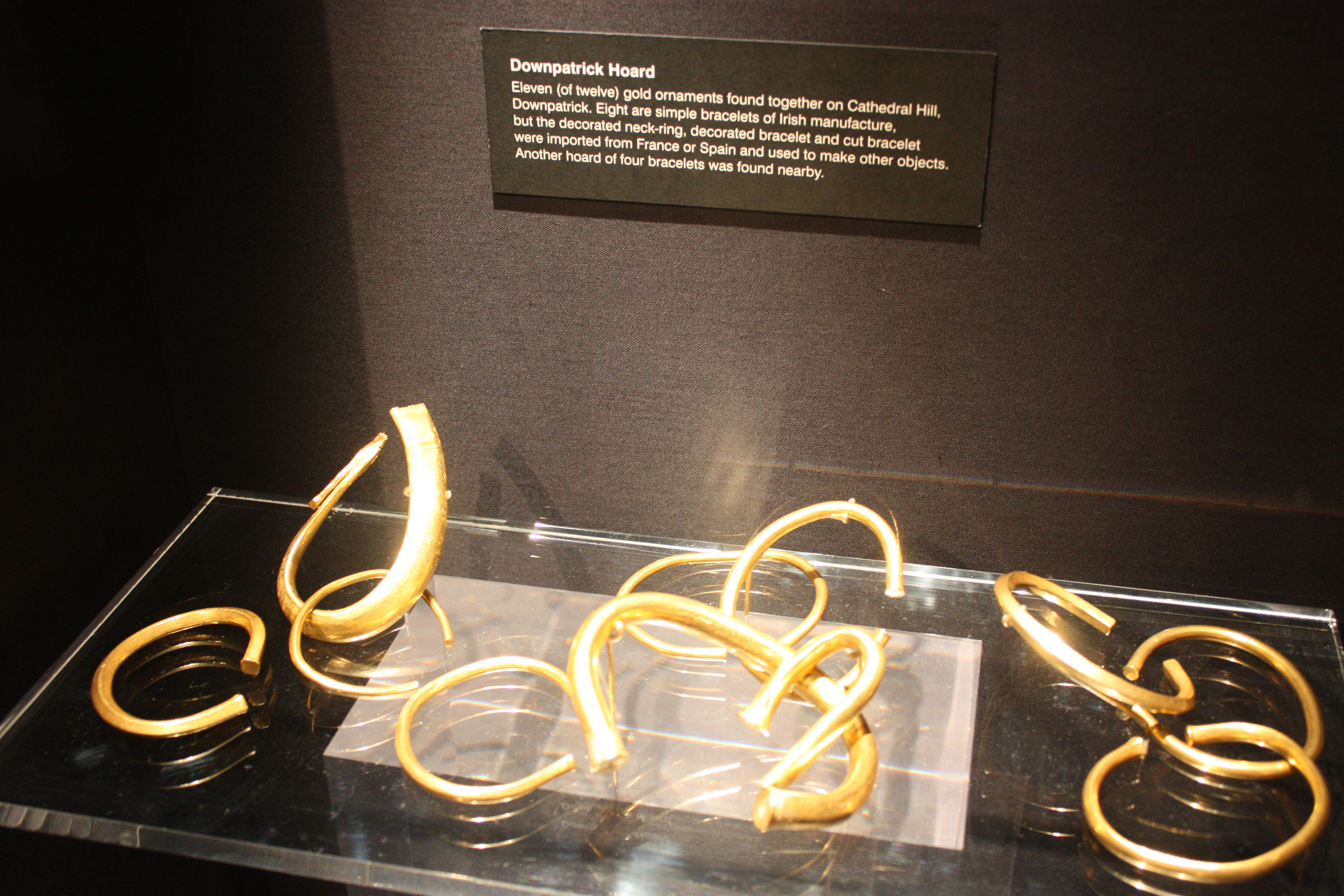
The important Downpatrick Hoard of Bronze Age gold jewellery

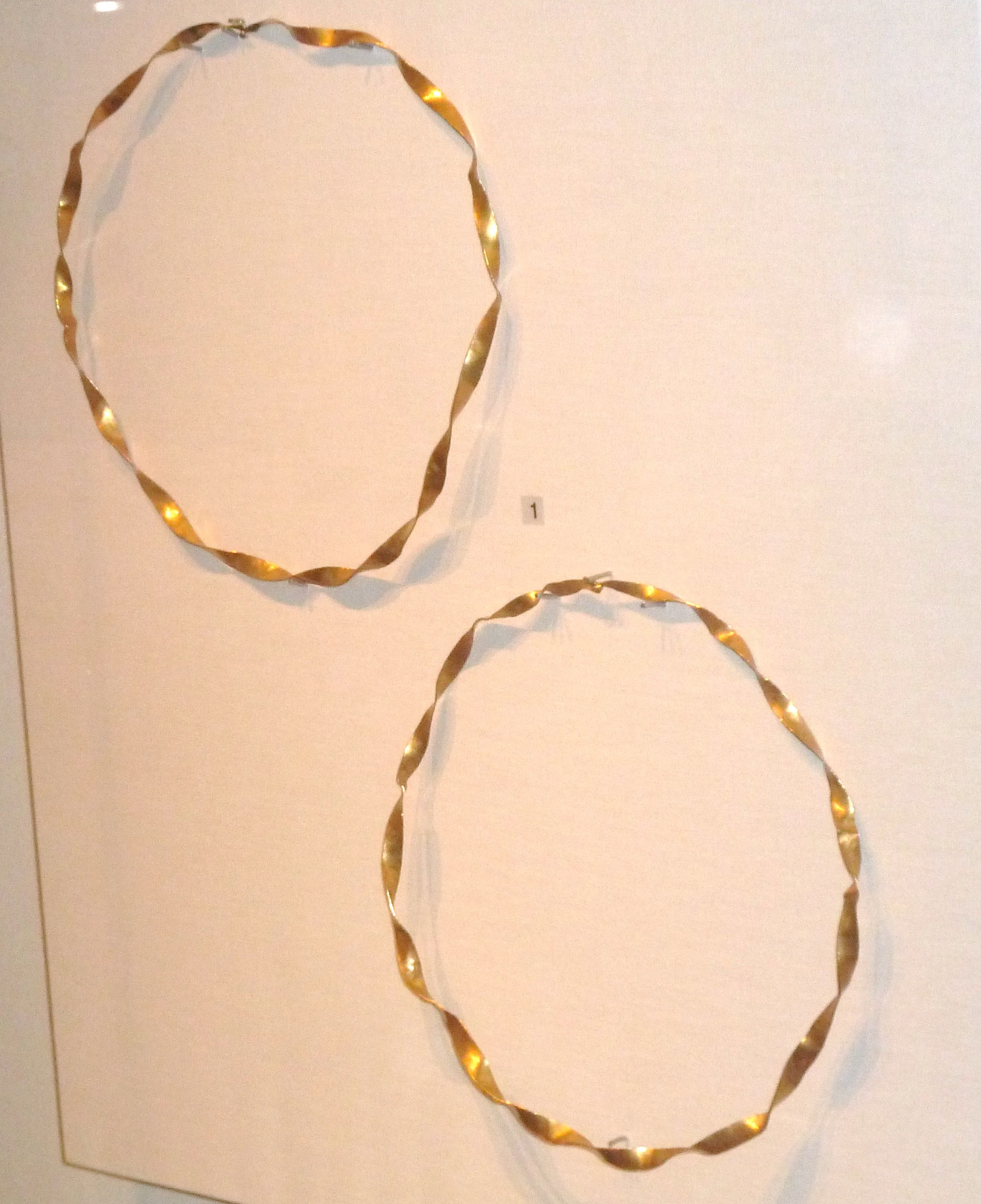
Bronze Age gold ribbon torcs, from near Ballyrashane, County Londonderry

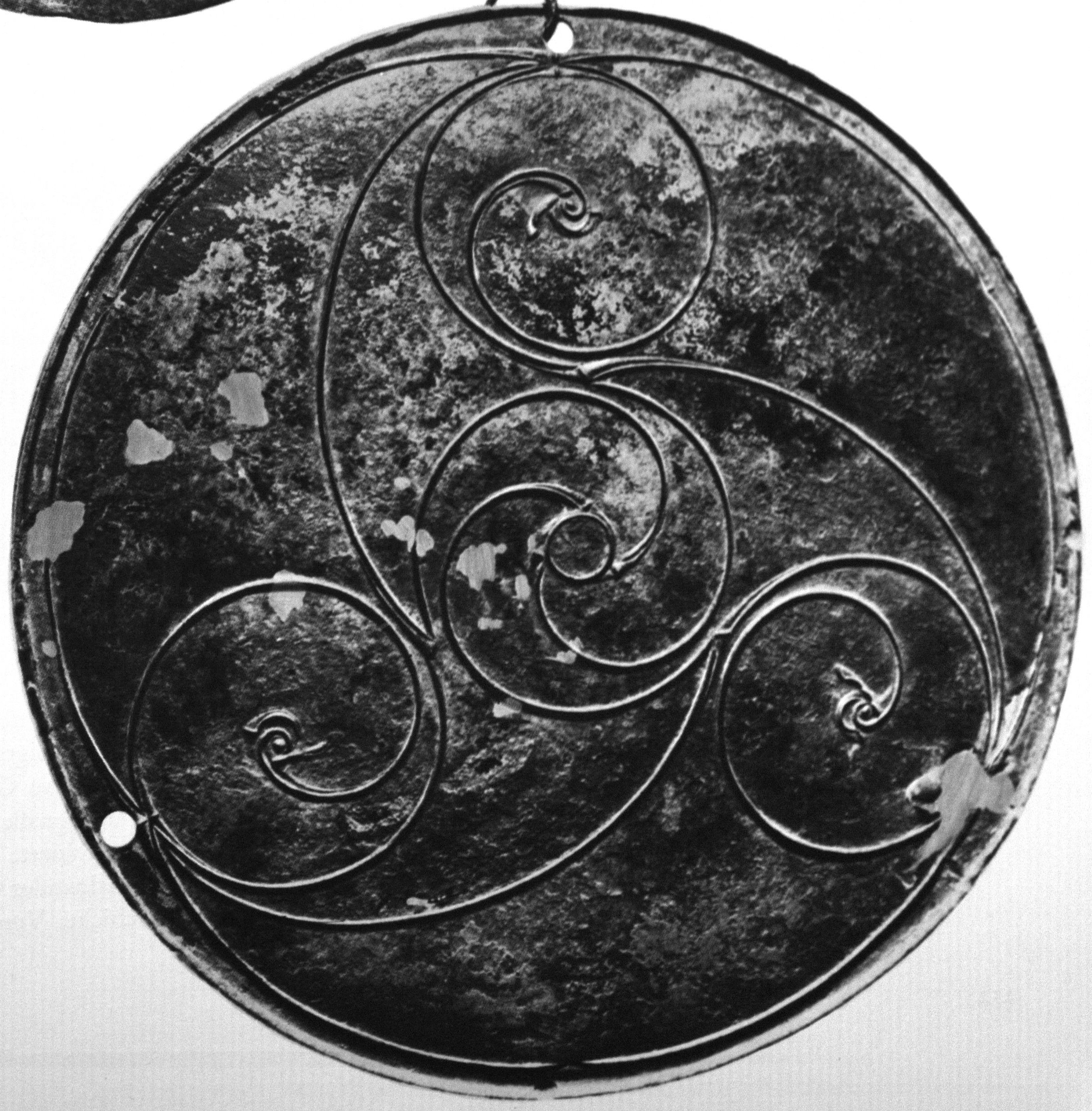
Bann disc, bronze with triskele decoration

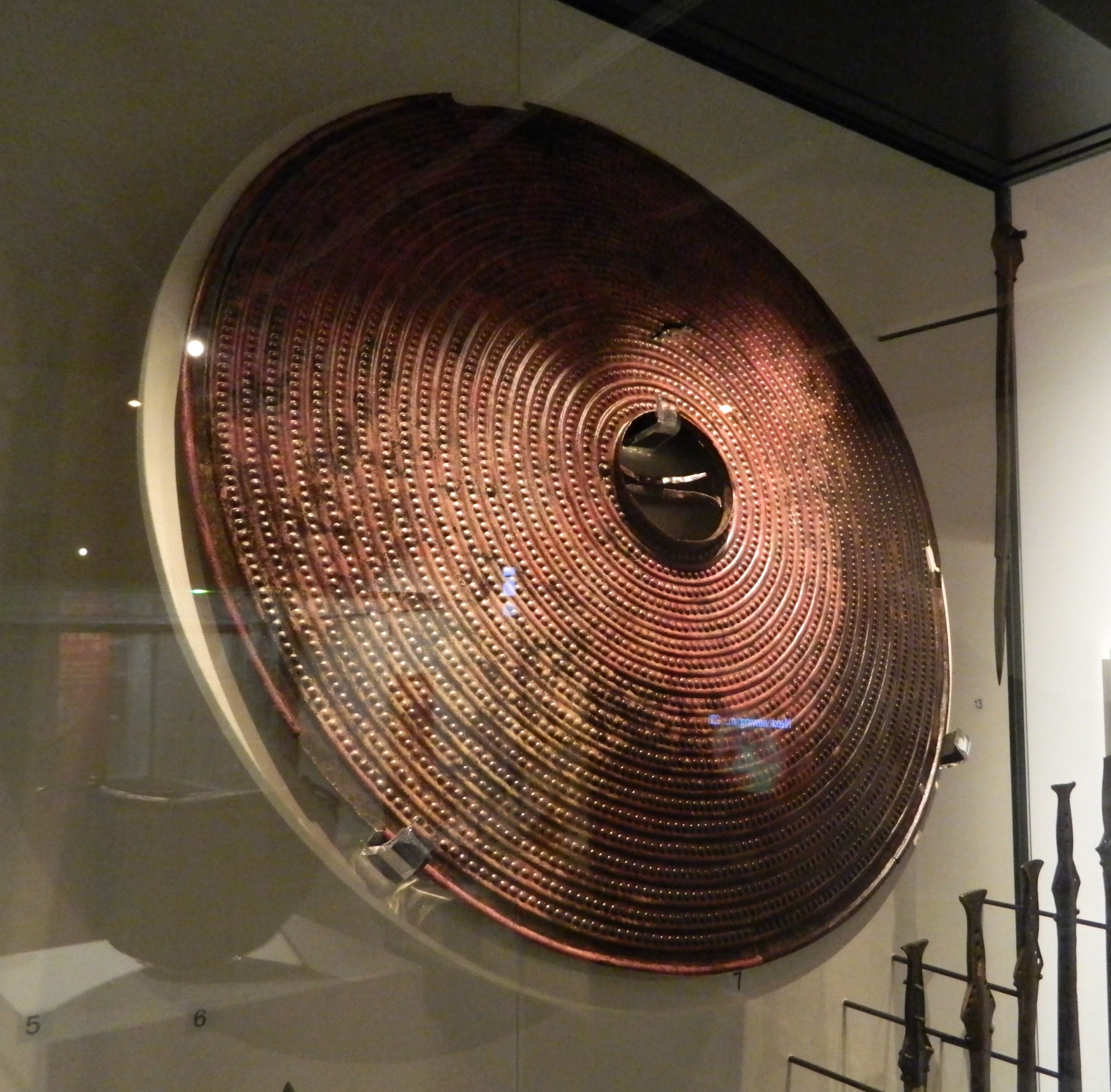
Decorated bronze Yetholm-type shield, found in the River Shannon at Barrybeg, County Roscommon

=== Zoology ===
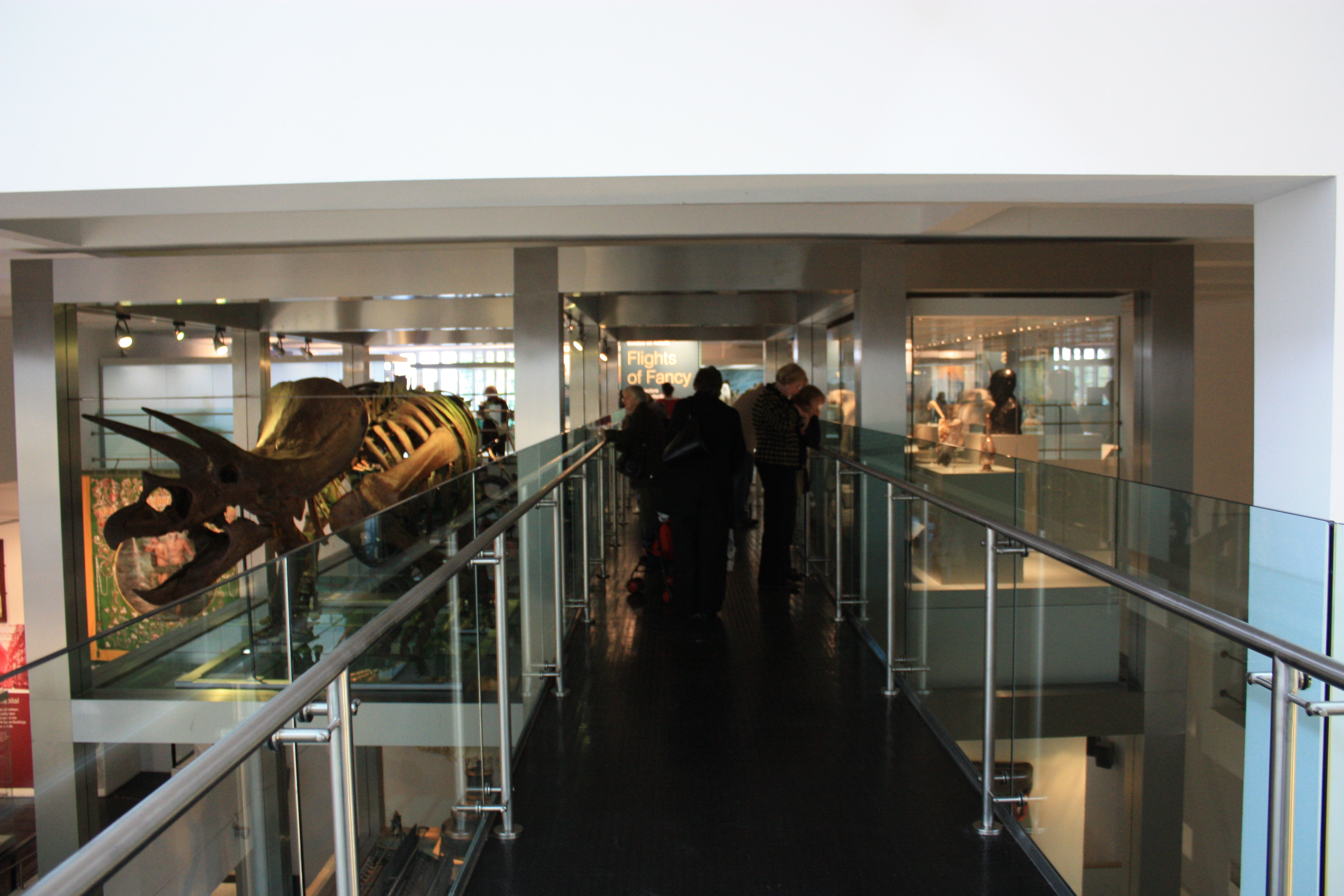
New Triceratops exhibit on re-opening, 22 October 2009

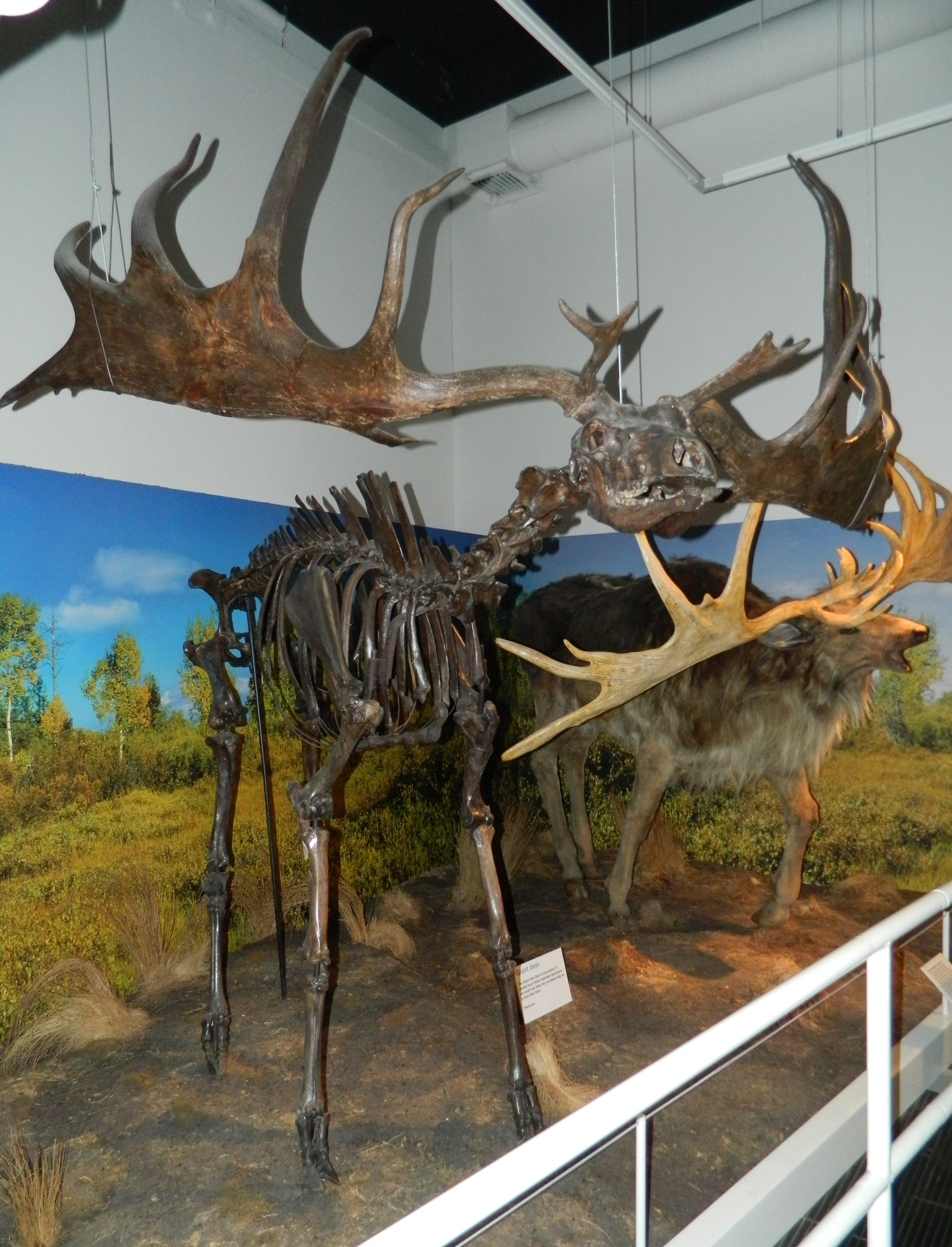
Irish elk skeleton

==== Historic collections ====
- Joseph Whitaker early 20th century, mounted birds from Sicily.
- William Thompson mid-19th-century author of Natural History of Ireland, Mollusca, birds, algae.
- Robert Templeton (Belfast, Colombo) mid-19th-century insects from Ceylon.
- George Crawford Hyndman mollusca and Indian birds.
- William Monad Crawford early 20th-century butterflies from Burma.
- Canon William Frederick Johnson early 20th-century, Coleoptera.
- Charles Langham early 20th century, Irish insects European butterflies.
- H.M Peebles Himalayan snow butterflies (Parnassiinae)
- Robert Welch early 20th-century Mollusca.
- Herbert T Malcolmson early 20th-century James Sheals bird mounts (Ireland).
- Thomas Workman late 19th-century Lepidoptera

==== Recent collections ====
- Paul Wilcox (1943– ) butterflies of Malaya.
- Paul Smart (1941– ) tropical butterflies
- Raymond Haynes Irish butterflies and moths
- James P. Brock Ichneumonidae
- Shell collections, nudibranchs and sea sponges
- J.R.Stoffel types of Agrias butterflies

==== Important individual specimens ====
- Holotype of the emperor penguin collected by Captain Crozier of Banbridge
- Champion Patrick of Ifold – Irish Wolfhound
- Dwarf elephant skeletons from Sicily.
- The Egyptian mummified body of Takabuti.
- Mummy case of Tjesmutperet.
- Slender-billed curlew
- Rothschild's, Queen Alexandra's and other birdwing butterflies.
- Giant clam – given to the Belfast Natural History Society by Francis Walker
- Lammergeier mount by James Sheals
- Gervais' beaked whale (Mesoplodon europaeus)
- Japanese spider crab
- Bonaparte's gull collected by William Thompson – the first European specimen.
- Giant squid model
- Thylacine
- Coelacanth
- Bald eagle juvenile from near Garrison, County Fermanagh on 11 January 1973. First European record.
- Passenger pigeon
- Irish elk
- Yellow-billed cuckoo (Irish specimen)
- Conus gloriamaris

==== Wildlife art ====
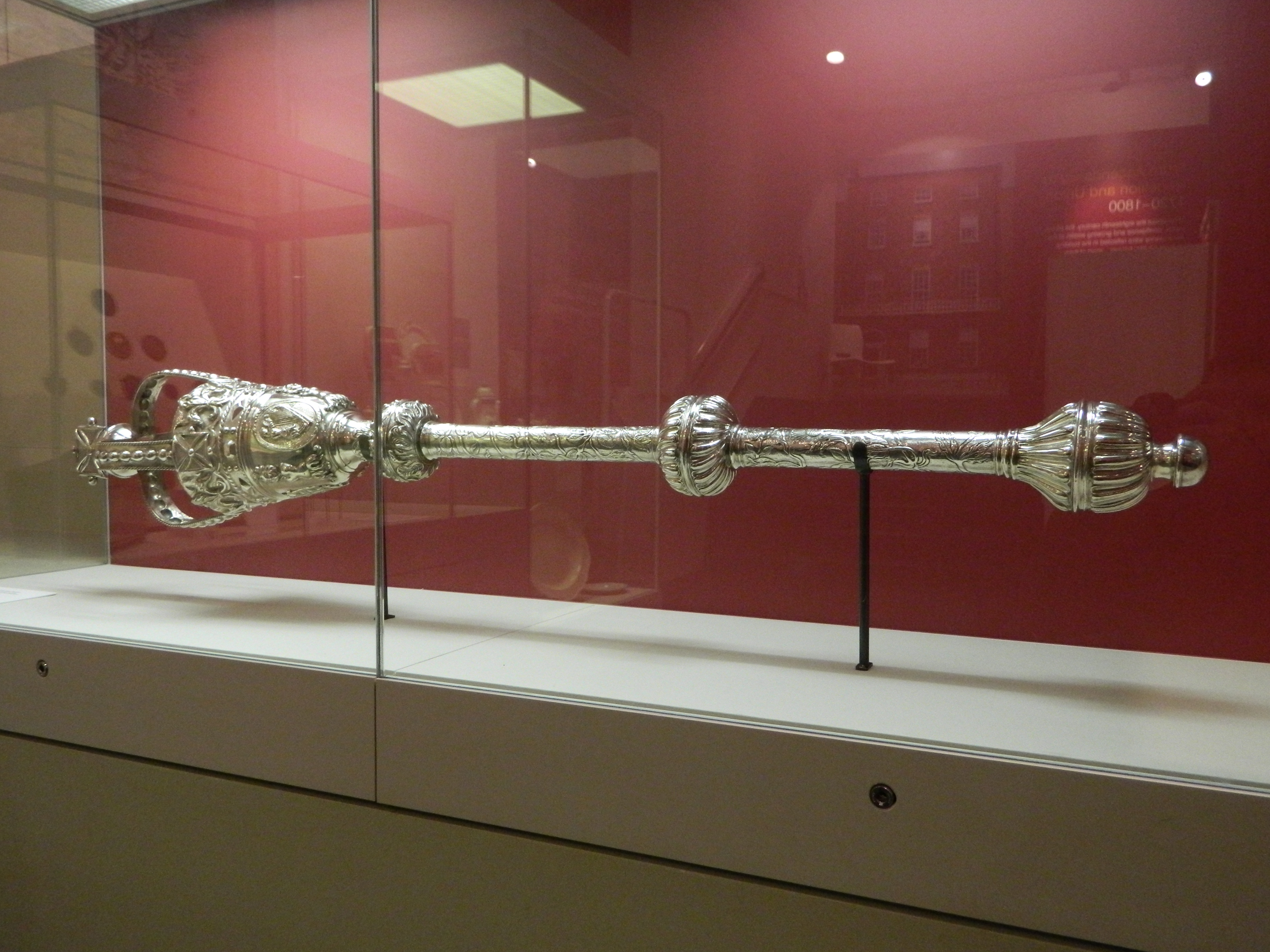
The Cavan Mace, 1724

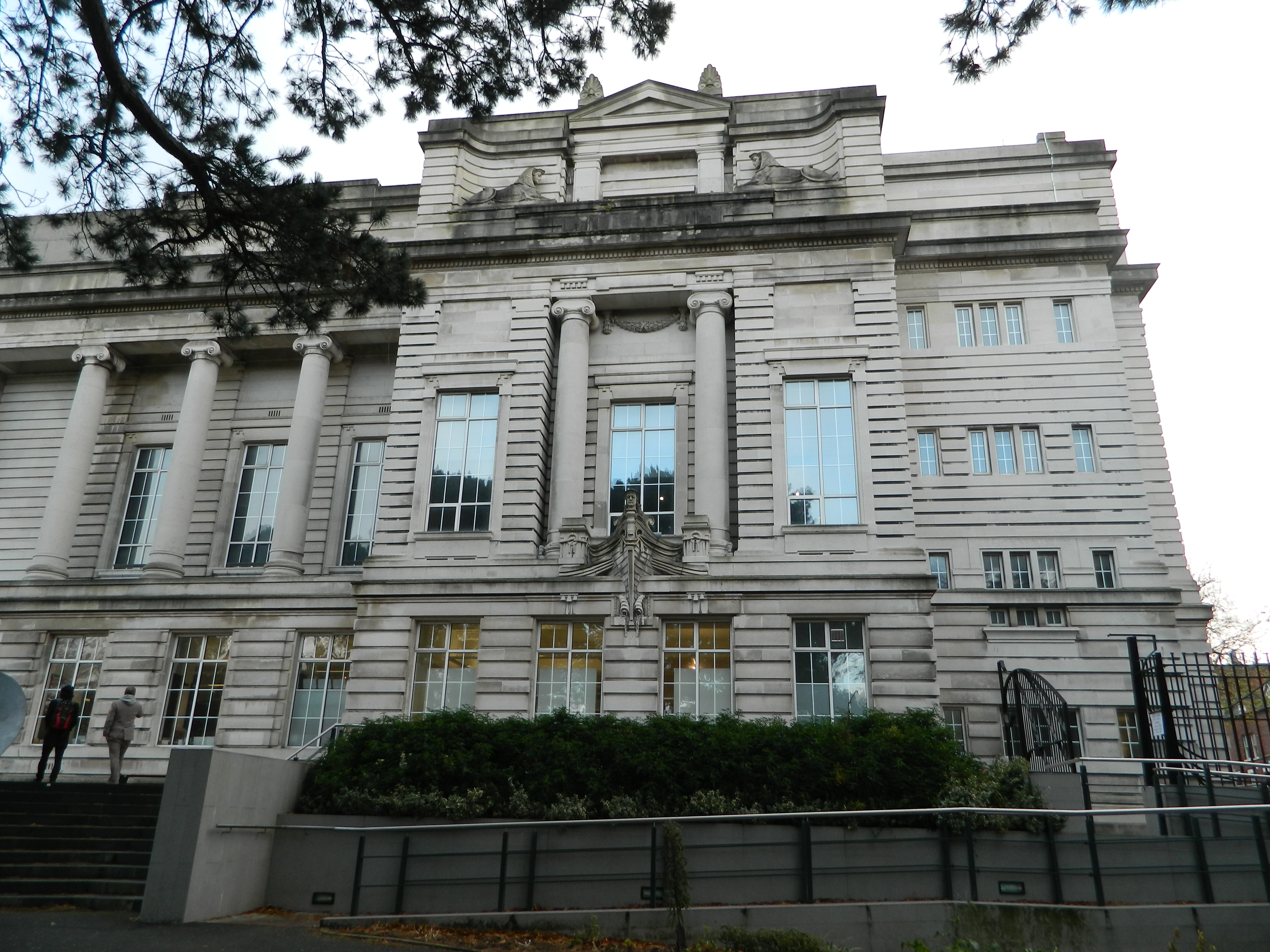
The older part of the Ulster Museum, designed by James Cumming Wynne

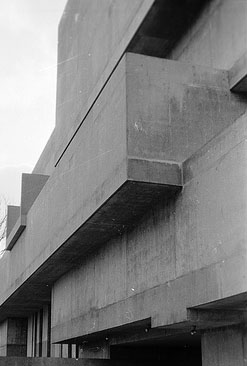
The new "Brutalist" northern exterior of Ulster Museum, by Francis Pym.

The Zoology Department also maintains collections of wildlife art. Works by Peter Scott, Joseph Wolf, Eric Ennion, John Gerrard Keulemans, Roger Tory Peterson, Charles Tunnicliffe, Robert Gillmor and Archibald Thorburn are included. Illustrated works held by the Zoology Department include British Entomology - being illustrations and descriptions of the genera of insects found in Great Britain and Ireland – a classic work of entomology by John Curtis and Niccolò Gualtieri's Index Testarum Conchyliorum, quae adservantur in Museo Nicolai Gualtieri 1742.

=== Botany ===
==== The herbarium (BEL) ====
The herbarium in the Ulster Museum (BEL), is based on specimens from Belfast Natural History and Philosophical Society (founded in 1821); the Belfast Naturalists' Field Club (founded in 1863); the Belfast Museum and Art Gallery (formed 1905) and the herbarium (BFT) of the Botany Department of The Queen's University, Belfast acquired in 1968. In total the number of specimens is more than 100,000. Although specimens from Northern Ireland are well represented, specimens from elsewhere in the world have been acquired by donation, exchange and purchase. All branches of the world's flora are represented: algae, lichens, fungi, mosses and pteridophytes (ferns), conifers and angiosperms. Little information about the Irish flora before 1830 is available, the oldest specimen in the Ulster Museum is an alga: Batrachospermum moniliforme (BEL: F41) collected in 1798 by John Templeton, other specimens of Batrachospermum, originally incorrectly identified as Thorea ramoissima were collected by John Templeton in 1815 from a "boghole" in County Donegal (BEL:F42 – F47). It was originally published by Harvey in 1841.

==== List of some of the collectors ====
- S.A.Bennett (1843–1929)
- Corrie Denew Chase (1878–1965) (vascular plants and algae) – his herbarium of about 4,000 sheets was passed to Methodist College Belfast who passed it to the Ulster Museum in 1970.
- John Cocs (1787–1861) (algae)
- Thomas Huge Correl (1859–1883) (vascular plans).
- A. Fenton (A.F-G.Fenton) (lichens)
- M.Foslie (algae)
- Paul Hackney (1945– ) (vascular plants and mosses)
- William Henry Harvey (1811–1866) (algae).
- George Crawford Hyndman (1796–1867) (algae).
- Frederick Hugh Woodhams Kerr (1885–1958) (vascular plants)
- Mary Patriria Happer Kertland (1901–1991) (vascular plants)
- William McCalla (c. 1814–1849) (algae).
- Osborne Morton (b. 1945) (lichens and algae)
- Robert Lloyd Praeger (1865–1953) (vascular plants)
- Arthur Wilson Stelfox (1883–1972) (vascular plants; with Myxomycete collected by his wife Margarita Dawson Stelfox, and her associate Margaret Williamson Rea)
- Samuel Alexander Stewart (1826–1910) (vascular plants)
- John Templeton (1766–1825) (algae).
- William Thompson (1805–1852) (algae).
- Sylvanus Wear (1858–1920) (vascular plants and algae)
- Coslett Herbert Waddell (1858–1919) (vascular plants, bryophytes and algae).

=== Art collections ===
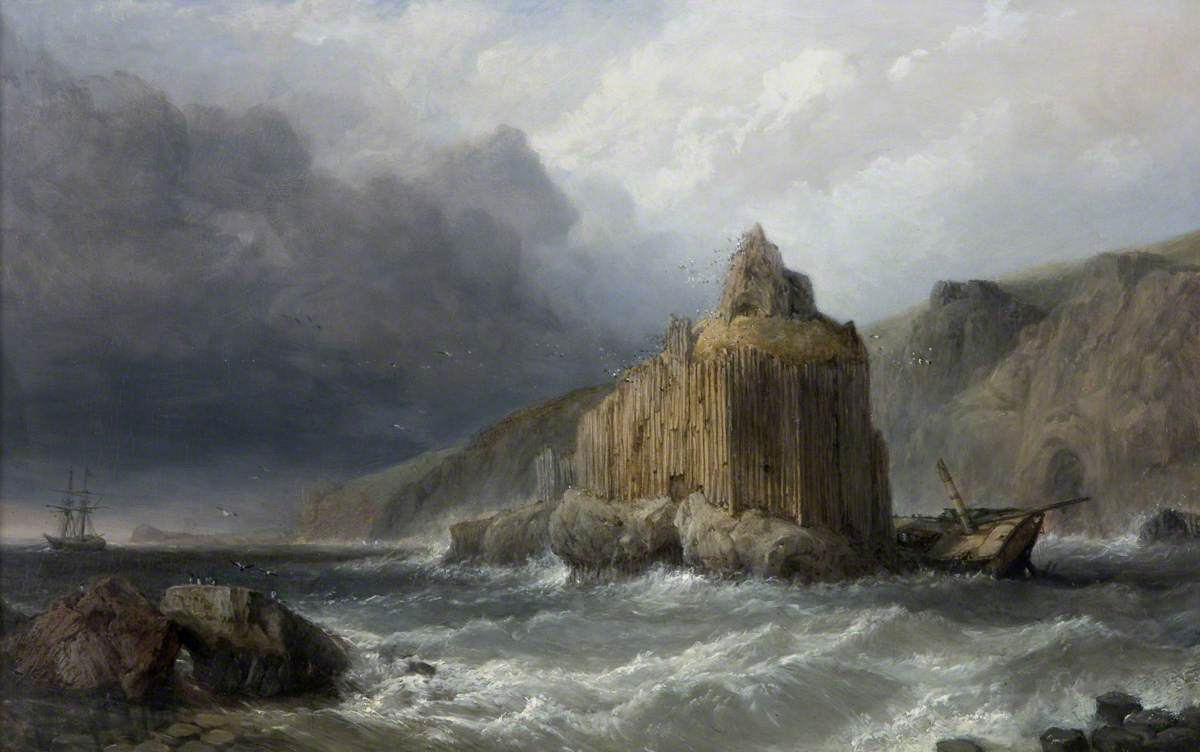
Stack Rock, County Antrim by Clarkson Stanfield, 1861

The collection contains works by:

- Jean Dubuffet
- Morris Louis
- Anthony Caro
- Karel Appel
- Francis Bacon
- Colin Middleton
- Joseph Beuys
- Eduardo Paolozzi
- Jean-Robert Ipoustéguy
- Marjorie Bloch
- Clarkson Stanfield

=== Fashion and textiles ===
The Ulster Museum's Fashion & Textiles Collection aims to reflect the history of fashionable dress from as early as the 18th century, as well as contemporary international designer and high street fashion. It comprises approximately 5000 objects including garments, accessories, historic and contemporary jewellery, and a collection of dolls and toys including pieces by Armand Marseille.

The museum's policy is to collect clothing and accessories as an Applied Art, with an emphasis on acquiring pieces that are of high design quality and/or representative of significant changes in fashion history. The collection includes eighteenth-century Spitalfields silk gowns, early 20th century Parisian couture, and contemporary international fashion . Designers represented in the collection include Chanel, Dior, Alexander McQueen, John Galliano, Vivienne Westwood and JW Anderson.

The textiles collection includes pieces by important female Irish embroiders, such as the 'Lennox Quilt' of 1712 by Martha Lennox, and a bedcover by the renowned eighteenth-century letter-writer and artist, Mrs Mary Delany. The Antrim bed furniture, a complete set worked by or under the supervision of Lady Helena McDonnell, 1705–83, daughter of the 4th Earl of Antrim was purchased in 1982. Tapestries include 'Arabesque' by Joshua Morris and the mid-20th century Adam and Eve by Louis le Brocquy. The textiles collection also includes two large linen wall hangings, Océanie – Le Ciel and Océanie – La Mer, by the French artist Henri Matisse.

==== Malone House fire ====
The Ulster Museum's original collection of costume and textiles was almost completely destroyed in a fire following the 1976 bombing of Malone House in Belfast in November 1976, during the Troubles.

Malone House was a large house in a public country park and was the headquarters of the National Trust in Northern Ireland at the time.

By Autumn 1976 the Ulster Museum's original costume and textile collection had been moved from unsuitable storage in the museum to Malone House. The museum held the top floor of the building which had been converted into costume and textile storage areas and a textile conservation workshop.

On 11 November, gunmen gained entry to Malone House and planted two bombs, one on the ground floor and on the first floor. A five-minute warning was given, and everyone in the building was safely evacuated. Although some rooms on the ground floor were relatively unharmed, the costume and textile collection on the second floor collapsed on top of the fire and quickly perished.

The collection included a collection of linen damask that was reckoned to be the best in the world after that of the Victoria and Albert Museum and the Rijksmuseum. Both Irish and Continental linens were represented.

One of the earliest items of costume destroyed in the fire was a lady's jacket of around 1600 with well-preserved polychrome silk and silver thread embroidery. The original Ulster Museum costume collection had a good selection of 18th-century garments costume, most with local connections such as a Spitalfields silk robe and petticoat of c. 1745 which had on the linen lining the stamp 'Sam Holmes – County Down'. Specimens of ladies' dresses existed for almost every year from the end of the eighteenth century until the 1970s. There were gaps in the range of men's costume, the eighteenth century being one of the best represented periods. The lace collection was comprehensive but with a bias towards Irish manufacturers. Lace had been collected on a proper systematic basis for longer than any other category of costume or textiles.

Among the few objects to survive were the museum's tapestries, which were still stored in the museum building at the time of the fire (the Pilgrimage to Mecca set by Paul Saunders, a Flemish 17th century verdure tapestry, an arabesque probably by Joshua Morris and a le Brocquy), the museum's large new jewellery collection, largely donated by the jewellery collector and historian, Anne Hull-Grundy, the Lennox Quilt – a highly embroidered signed and dated quilt of 1712 by Martha Lennox, and four 1950s and 1960s cocktail and evening dresses which were also on display.

===== Rebuilding the Fashion Collection =====
The Ulster Museum's declared aim immediately after the bombing was to try to replace the lost collection as soon as possible. Due to having to restart the collection from almost nothing, the museum was forced to re-examine its collecting policy. The main criterion became to collect fashion and textiles as an Applied Art and that it "must reflect the tastes and cultural interests and aspirations of the time it was made".

Rebuilding the collection was helped by the museum's right to government compensation to indemnify its losses. This enabled the museum to purchase historic fashion and couture from auctions in Christies and Sothebys on a regular basis throughout the late 1970s, 1980s, and 1990s. This enabled the Ulster Museum, almost alone in Great Britain, to be able to compete with American and continental dealers on equal terms for items which were considered particularly appropriate to the collection. Notable pieces in the collection include a cut velvet and metal thread suit worn by the Irish Black Rod in the Irish House of Lords in 1751, a number of very fine women's outfits of mid 18th century Spitalfields silk.

It is the 20th-century haute couture and contemporary fashions are the most distinctive elements of the collection. Many important designers are represented, from Paul Poiret, Coco Chanel and Christian Dior to Alexander McQueen, John Galliano and Vivienne Westwood.

====== Collecting Contemporary Fashion ======
Since 1984 the Ulster Museum has acquired both International Designer Outfit, High Street Outfit every year. This policy has enabled the Ulster Museum to build a comprehensive overview of late 20th and 21st-century fashion. Recent acquisitions include a 'We Should All Be Feminists' t-shirt by Maria Grazia Chiuri for Dior, pieces by JW Anderson, and pieces by Raf Simons for Calvin Klein.

The Ulster Museum holds work by most important 20th century Paris designers and very many post-war English and Irish designers. High Street labels such as Wallis and Etam are also represented. Magazines and contemporary photographs are systematically kept to complement actual specimens.

=== Past art exhibitions ===
- Scultura Italiana 1964
- Henri Laurens, 16 July-30 August 1971
- Fabric and Form: Irish Fashion Since the 1950s, 1996
- Fashion & Feminism June 2018 – June 2019

=== Ethnographic collections ===
- Chola art.
- Bronze statues from the Chola Dynasty.
- Samurai armour.
- Solomon Islands war canoe. (Similar boat).

=== Girona ===
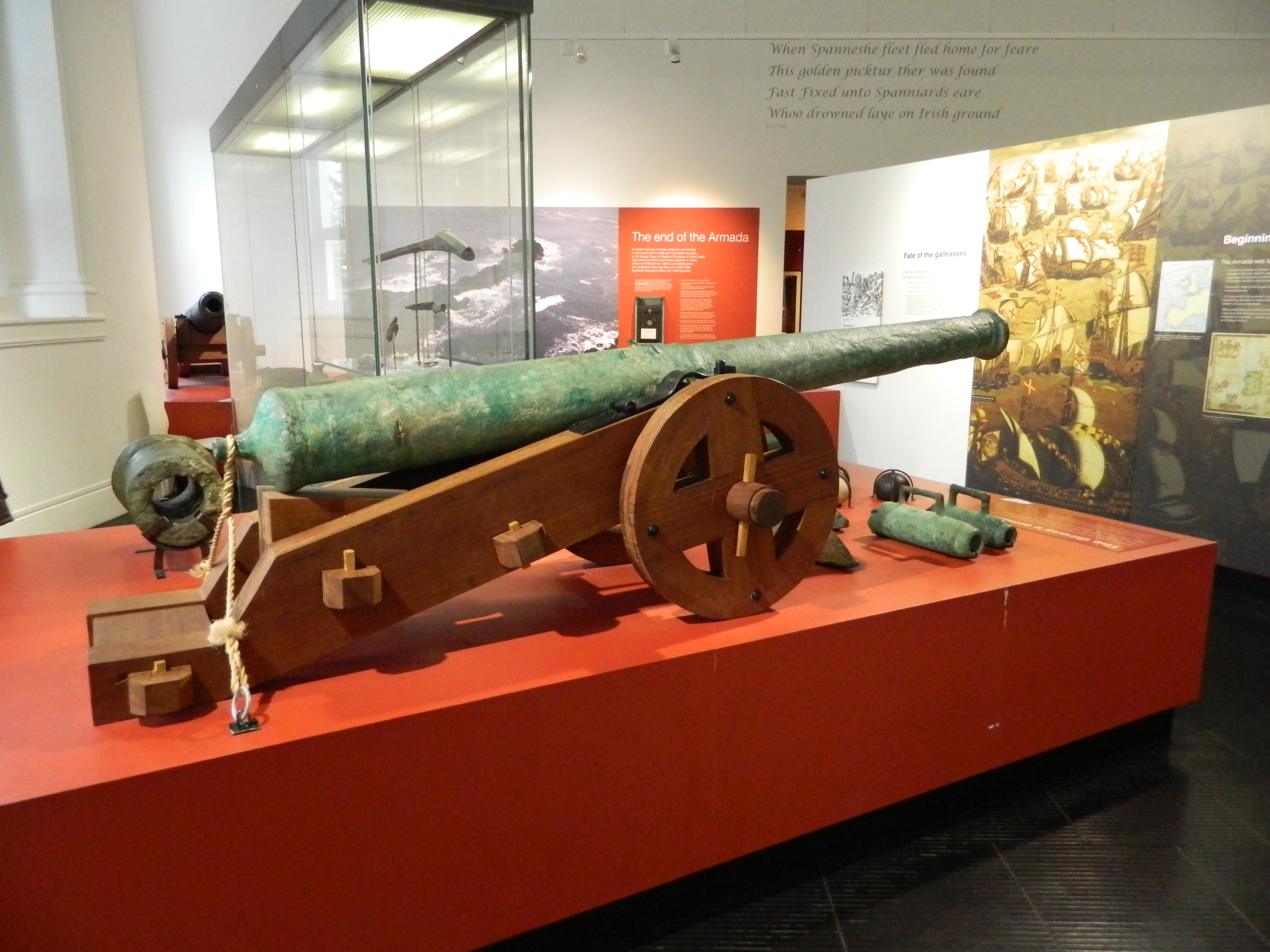
Cannon from the galleass Girona

The museum acquired in 1971 Spanish Armada artefacts from the galleass Girona, which sank off Ireland in 1588 .

== Controversy at the 132nd Royal Ulster Academy exhibition ==
In 2013, at the 132nd Royal Ulster Academy exhibition at the Ulster Museum "The Kiss" by artist Paul Walls was not displayed following discussions between the museum and the academy. It was decided as the subject matter, two women kissing, was inappropriate for school visits. A petition was organised on Change.org.

== Rail access ==
Botanic is the nearest station on NI Railways. Regular trains ply between Belfast Grand Central, City Hospital, Botanic and Belfast Lanyon Place.

== See also ==
- Irish art
- History of phycology
- List of tourist attractions in Ireland

== Bibliography ==
- Hackney, P. 1972. Notes on the vascular plant herbarium of the Ulster Museum. Irish Naturalists' Journal 17: 230 – 233.
- Hackney, P. 1980. Some early nineteenth century herbaria in Belfast. 20: 114 – 119.
- Hackney, P. 1981. British vascular plant collection of the Ulster Museum. Biology Curators' Group. 2: 2 – 3.
- Nesbitt, N. 1979. A Museum in Belfast. Ulster Museum.
- McMillan, N.F. and Morton, O. 1979. A Victorian album of algae from the north of Ireland with specimens collected by William Sawers. Irish Nataturalists' Journal. 19: 384 – 387.
- Morton, O. 1977a. A note on W.H.Harvey's algae in the Ulster Museum. Irish Naturalists' Journal 18: 26.
- Morton, O. 1977b. Sylvanus Wear's algal collection in the Ulster Museum. Irish Naturalists' Journal 19: 92 – 93.
- Morton, O. 1980. Three algal collections in the Ulster Museum herbarium. Irish Naturalists' Journal 20: 33 – 37.
- Morton, O. 1981a. Algae in Biology Curators Group Newsletter. 3: 12 – 13.
- Morton, O. 1981b American algae collected by W.H.Harvey and others, in the Ulster Museum Herbarium. Taxon 30: 867–868.
- Morton, O. 1994. Marine Algae of Northern Ireland. Ulster Museum, Belfast. ISBN 0-900761-28-8
- Praeger, R.L. 1949. Some Irish Naturalist.
