= Alexander Williams (artist) =

Irish painter (1846–1930)

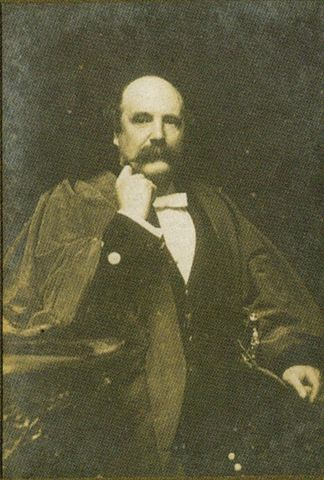
- Born: 21 April 1846; The Diamond, Monaghan town, Ireland
- Died: 15 November 1930 (aged 84)

Alexander Williams RHA (21 April 1846 – 15 November 1930) was an Irish landscape and marine painter. He was also an ornithologist, taxidermist, and professional singer.

== Early life and family ==
Alexander Williams was born at the house of his aunt on The Diamond in Monaghan Town on 21 April 1846. His father was William Williams, a hatter. He attended Drogheda Grammar School. He was raised in Drogheda in County Louth, where the family lived over the family business, a hatters and shop. The Williams had been hatters for a number of generations, dating back to an ancestor who settled in Ireland in the 1600s from Glamorganshire who was a felter. In 1860 the family moved to Dublin, living at May 1860 to 19 Bayview Avenue, North Strand, Dublin. The Williams first Dublin hat shop was on Westmoreland Street.

Williams married Kitty Gray on 4 April 1881 in St Peter's, Aungier Street. She was the daughter of George Gray, vicar choral of Westminster Abbey, Armagh Cathedral, and St Patrick's Cathedral, Dublin. The couple had one daughter and one son, George (1882–1904).

== Taxidermy ==
With the decline in his father's hatting business, Alexander and his brother Edward (1848-1905) started a sideline in taxidermy, founding Williams & Son, Dublin. Their father had learnt basic taxidermy from a Mr. Evatt of Mount Louise, County Monaghan, and he taught his sons.

Both the hatters and the taxidermy shops co-existed at 1 Dame Street for a time and began what the ornithologist Richard M. Barrington described in the Irish Naturalist magazine as "the battle of the hats and birds", remarking that:

[...] one could readily perceive that Mr Williams senior, while proud of his sons' achievements, was most reluctant to permit his own occupation to be interfered with, for Edward was anxious to banish the hats and fill the window with birds. The struggle between the hats and birds was renewed with the result that there were two windows one for hats another for birds. Gradually however (fortunately for Irish naturalists) the birds, assisted by the beasts and fishes, swept their enemies the hats away altogether, and when another change of residence was made to the adjoining premises No 2 Dame Street, the entire front was filled with interesting and attractive specimens so lifelike and natural that their novelty in Dublin attracted the attention of many foot passengers, and a group was always collected on the pavement outside the window. It is unusual for a competition such as I have described to terminate so conclusively in favour of natural science.

In 1866, a fire broke out in the taxidermy workshop which destroyed the family business and killed six residents of the adjoining house. Operating from 2 Dame Street, the business became a success from the 1870s, with private individuals and institutions such as the Natural History Museum, Dublin among their clients.

While he served his apprenticeship as a hatter and then pursued a career in taxidermy, Williams also pursued painting. William Brocas, an established artist of the period, visited the hat shop and Williams' father suggested that he show the artist some of his work. Williams recalled the artist's response:

Brocas gazed at me intently, brushing back with his hand the thick hair on my forehead and remarked, "He has a fine head! Make an artist of him is it?" Then in a tone of withering contempt that I have never forgotten, he added: "Make a sweep of him first." This pronouncement from a well known Dublin artist, who my Father considered eminent in his profession, was a finishing stroke and I need hardly remark that my Father seem[ed] inclined to throw cold water on my further efforts.

== Artistic career ==
Williams turned to a photographer and artist, Forster in Westmoreland Street, for advice. "His reply was concise and to the point and I never forgot it. Sit down in the first ditch you come to and try and paint what you see!" He remained largely self-taught, attending only the Royal Dublin Society night school for some lessons in drawing and painted in oils and watercolours. He exhibited Hard Times, a winter scene with birds painted from nature, at the Royal Hibernian Academy annual exhibition of 1870, and had his first sales at the RHA the following year. He continued to exhibit at the academy every year until his death, exhibiting over 450 paintings with the RHA.

Williams left the taxidermy business when he was appointed as an alto at Her Majesty's Chapel Royal, Dublin Castle, having also sung with the Dublin Glee and Madrigal Union quintet. A pivotal experience for him came the previous year when he visited Achill island, off the coast of Mayo. He wrote to his father saying:

I had found a part of Ireland where there was an immense field for the activities of an artist, and that I intended to make it peculiarly my own, and devote myself to making its wonderful scenery known.

The following year he was one of the founder members and first secretary of the Dublin Sketching Club. He also exhibited regularly with the Water Colour Society of Ireland, and contributed pictures to various other societies.

Following his election to the RHA as an associate member in 1884, he held his first solo exhibition at the Leinster Hall, Molesworth Street. He maintained his solo exhibitions in Dublin, missing few years, until 1926. Outside Ireland, Williams travelled to a number of English towns, including Manchester and Birmingham and he exhibited for a number of years in Bond Street, London. His work was shown in Switzerland and Canada and in America. At the World Fair in Chicago in 1893 he was represented by Sweet Dublin Bay, while at the St Louis World Fair of 1904, in association with the Congested District Board, he showed an extensive collection.

In 1899, Williams took a lease on a ruined cottage and three acres of land on the edge of Bleanaskill Bay, Achill Island. Over a period of years, he built a house and laid out a garden. Among his surviving papers is a diary that Williams kept between 1906 and 1913 of his time on Achill island.

He was commissioned by Blackie & Son in 1911 to produce paintings used to illustrate a set of four books entitled Beautiful Ireland.

While the majority of his work was of natural landscapes, a smaller part of his work consisted of Dublin. He actively painted buildings and streets which were about to be demolished. Following his solo exhibition in Dublin in 1901, the Irish Times had this to say:

Mr Williams has devoted his life to depicting the beauties of Irish scenery of every phase, from the rugged coasts of the West to the quiet rural scenes nearer home. In this he has done the nation service. He has helped stimulate public taste in the appreciation of native scenery. Many who knew nothing of the enchantments of Achill Island have been led to find them from first seeing the Cliffs of Meenaun or the Valley Strand upon the walls of the Leinster Hall. His devotion to Ireland in his art is worthy of all praise.

== Death and legacy ==
Williams died on 15 November 1930. He left 35 volumes of papers, including several volumes of memoirs, diaries, exhibition and guest books, financial accounts, and innumerable letters. Two further ornithological diaries are in the possession of the Ulster Museum.

The National Gallery of Ireland, the Hugh Lane Gallery, and Monaghan County Museum each own a work. The National Library of Ireland and the Crawford Gallery both have a number of his sketches. The Lake Hotel in Killarney hold a number of works by him.

== Bibliography ==
- Butler, Patricia The Silent Companion, An Illustrated History of the Water Colour Society of Ireland, 2010. Antique Collectors' Club.
- Ledbetter, Gordon T. (2010). Privilege and Poverty, The Life and Times of Irish Painter and Naturalist Alexander Williams RHA (1846-1930). Cork: The Collins Press. ISBN 97818-48890343. OCLC 648100922. (for a review see: Murray 2010)
- Murray, Peter (23 October 2010). "Gordon Ledbetter: Privilege and Poverty: The Life and Times of Irish Painter & Naturalist Alexander Williams RHA 1846-1930". Irish Examiner.
- Snoddy, Theo Dictionary of Irish Artists 20th Century, 2nd Edition, 2002. Merlin Publishing.
