= Alexander Carte =

Irish paleozoologist

- Born: 11 August 1805; Newcastle West, County Limerick
- Died: 25 September 1881 (aged 76); Dublin
- Known for: Directorship of the Natural History Museum, Dublin
- Scientific career
- Fields: zoology and paleontology

Alexander Carte MD, FRCSI, MRIA (11 August 1805 – 25 September 1881) was an Irish zoologist and palaeontologist and was first director Natural History Museum, Dublin.

== Early life ==
Alexander Carte was born 11 August 1805 to Edward and Margaret Carte (née Elliot), in Newcastle West, County Limerick, the couple's only son. Edward Carte was an agent for the Devon estates in County Limerick. Carte began his education at Mr O'Brien's Academy, Limerick, then entering the Royal College of Surgeons in Ireland in 1823. His education progressed, attaining a BA in 1830, MA in 1833, MB in 1840, and finally an MD in 1860. Carte obtained a licence from the RCSI, and became a fellow in 1844, although he never engaged in general practice. Carte married Ellen Dickson circa 1829, living at 14 Northbrook Road, Leeson Park, Dublin, with whom he had no children.

== Museum career ==
Carte was appointed curator of the RCSI Museum in 1846, overseeing a collections of primarily anatomical specimens, instigating many improvements to the museum and its collections. He then went on to become the director of the Royal Dublin Society Museum in 1851. Carte systematically overhauled the museum's collections, cataloguing, naming and allocating all exhibits into organised groups. During this reorganisation Carte also solicited new acquisitions for the Museum from prominent figures such as Sir Richard Griffith, Sir William Wilde, Andrew Leith Adams, Edward Percival Wright, William Andrews, and Captain Sir Francis Leopold McClintock. Between 1851 and 1861, a large number of donations were made to the museum, most notably a collection of over 2500 bird skins.

During his time as director, Carte oversaw the construction of a purpose-built museum building for the Society's expanding collections, which opened in 1857. When the Museum became part of the new Museum of Science and Art Dublin under the Department of Science and Art London in South Kensington in 1878 following an 1877 act, Carte became the Natural History Museum's first director. Carte's work on the organisation of the Museum, grouping animals taxonomically, can still be seen in the Museum today. In the period following, Carte oversaw the purchase of a large collection of marine specimens from Peter Christen Asbjørnsen and over 500 glass models of marine animals from Leopold and Rudolf Blaschka.

Apart from his museum work, Carte sat on the council of the RCSI for many years, and was a member of the Royal Irish Academy, the Linnean Society, and the Imperial Botanical and Zoological Society, Vienna. Carte had a keen interest in paleontology and the cave systems of Ireland. He published in the Royal Dublin Society Journal and the Geological Society of Dublin Journal on subjects from comparative anatomy to the possible existence of the polar bear in Ireland in the past. He published with William Hellier Baily naming a new species of plesiosaur, Rhomaleosaurus cramptoni. A fossil giant dormouse from Malta, Myoxus cartei adams, was named in Carte's honour by Andrew Leith Adams in 1863.

Carte died 25 September 1881, and was buried at Mount Jerome Cemetery in the family vault. He was succeeded in the Museum by Alexander Goodman More.
