= John S. Jackson (geologist) =

John Semple Jackson
- Born: 21 February 1920; Dublin, Ireland
- Died: 19 November 1991 (aged 71); Killarney, County Kerry
- Education: Trinity College, Dublin
- Known for: first environmental consultant in Ireland
- Awards: Edge prize (1949)
- Scientific career
- Fields: Geology, Environmentalism

John S. Jackson (21 February 1920 – 19 November 1991) was an Irish geologist and environmentalist, and is believed to be the first environmental consultant in Ireland.

== Life ==
John Semple Jackson was born 21 February 1920 in Dublin, the fifth child of six of Francis Robert and Elizabeth Jackson (née St John). Jackson's mother died in 1931, when he was aged 10. His father married her sister, Harriet "Tot" Semple, after she was widowed following the death of Rev. John Semple.

Jackson grew up at the family home of Farmhill, Athy, County Kildare. He attended the Model School in Athy, going on to St Columba's College, Rathfarnham, County Dublin. After leaving school, Jackson worked in the family business, and passed the preliminary exam for Associateship of the Royal Institute of the Architects of Ireland to study architecture. In 1941, Jackson met his future wife, Sally (Mary Adina McCutcheon) at a dance in Alexandra College. Jackson was accepted into University of Oxford in 1942, but instead joined the Royal Air Force in 1943 training in England and Miami as a pilot. Sally signed up to the Women's Auxiliary Air Force as a radio mechanic around the same time, and they met a few times during the course of World War II. Jackson returned to England to train pilots in Cambridge.

It has been said that it was flying over North America that spurred his interest in geology, and after the war Jackson began studying natural science in Trinity College, Dublin in 1946. Graduating with a BA in geology and zoology in 1950, having won the Edge prize in 1949. During this time, Jackson also edited the magazine TCD. Sally also attended TCD from 1947 to 1950, receiving a BA in mental and moral philosophy. The pair married on 6 November 1948 in Rathmines, and shared the care of their first child, born in 1950, to allow them both to attend lectures. They went on to have three sons, living in Dundrum, and later Ballybrack, County Dublin.

== Career ==
Jackson began his geology career as a lecturer at University College Dublin. His interest in palaeontology and stratigraphy led him to complete a PhD in 1955 investigating the carboniferous stratigraphy of Kingscourt, County Cavan. In 1957 Jackson left UCD to take up the position of keeper in the Natural History Museum, Dublin. During the 11 years that Jackson spent in the Museum, he expanded and curated the geological collections, and promoted the museum through national and international societies and associations.

Jackson left the museum in 1968 to become one of only a small number of geological consultants in Ireland. Despite leaving the museum, as it took him away from the fieldwork he enjoyed, he served on the Board of Visitors of the National Museum of Ireland until 1988. The consultancy work allowed him to spend his time outside and he quickly expanded his brief to include amenity and nature conservation, and it has been asserted that he was the first environmental consultant in Ireland. In conjunction with this work with quarry and mining developers, Jackson lectured on mining and engineering geology in TCD (1968–70) and National University of Ireland, Galway (1972–75), and was extension lecturer of the Royal Dublin Society and consultant palaeontologist to the Geological Survey of Ireland (1971–75). He also lectured on environmental conservation to architecture students in Bolton St. College of Technology, and was a frequent contributor to radio and television broadcasts on conservation and mining.

His consultancy work also brought him to work for An Bord Fáilte preparing a list of sites of scientific importance in Ireland with D. A. Webb, A.E.J. Went and W.A. Watts in 1963. Jackson was a member of two government working parties that collected inventories of outstanding landscapes and sites of scientific interest in Ireland, which became what are now under EU legislation called Special Areas of Conservation (SACs).

A sample of his publications on geology, archaeology, nature, and environmental conservation can be found in the 1973 Who's who, what's what and where in Ireland. His work on many issues relating to conservation led to appointments on European, government, and semi-state advisory groups and committees, including the European committee for the conservation of nature and natural resources, and the RDS committee for science and its industrial application. Jackson was the chairman of the editorial committee of the Irish Naturalists' Journal. He was also a member of many societies including the RDS, Zoological Society of Ireland, Geological Society of London, Irish Geological Association (as a founder member and first president), Palaeontological Association, Geological Society of Yorkshire, Systematics Association, and An Taisce, of which he served as secretary (1964–66), chairman (1974–75), and president (1975–77).

== Later life and legacy ==
Jackson and his wife moved to Clondalkin in 1977 where their son, Michael Lunn Jackson, established pottery business, Stoneware Jackson. They retired to Ardmanagh, Schull, County Cork in 1988, with Jackson continuing to lecture and maintain an interest in mining and quarries. Following his move to County Cork, Jackson became involved with local societies, including the Mizen field club, Schull Development Association, and Schull Astronomical Society.

Jackson died suddenly in Killarney, County Kerry, on 19 November 1991. He was buried in Altar graveyard, west Cork. Jackson's collection of 3500 books, memoirs, journals, and maps are housed in the department of geology in University College Cork as the John S. Jackson Library. The Royal Dublin Society John Jackson Lecture was inaugurated in 1994 in his memory.
