= Stepney Causeway =

Street in Stepney, London

Coordinates: 51.512°N 0.0451°W

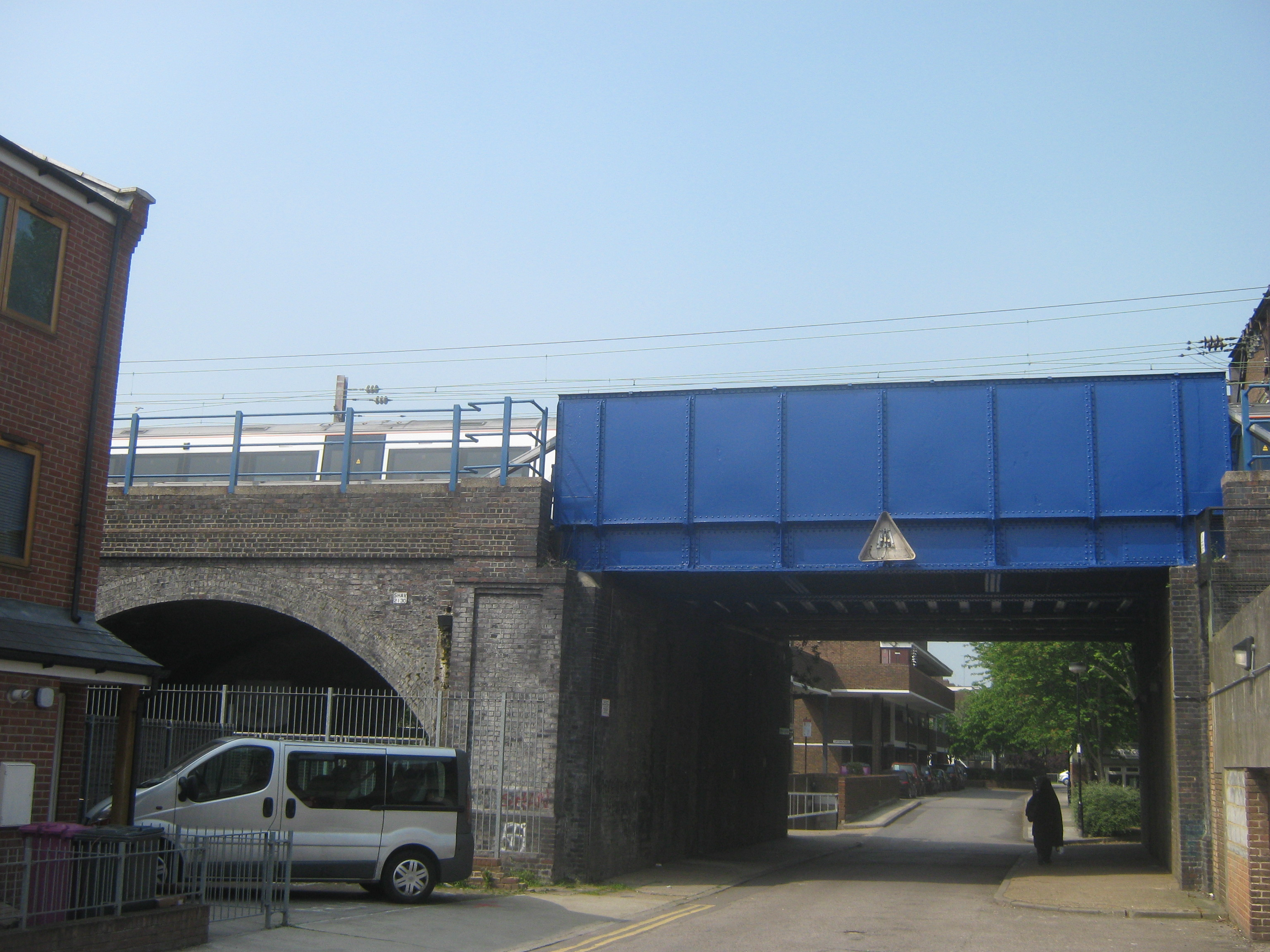
DLR railway bridge on Stepney Causeway

Stepney Causeway is a street in Stepney, in the East End of London. It runs north–south between the A13 road (Commercial Road) and the B126 Cable Street. It is crossed by a railway bridge carrying the Docklands Light Railway and c2c line out of Fenchurch Street railway station. The street is particularly associated with Thomas John Barnardo, who opened his first shelter for homeless children at No 18.

== Barnardo ==
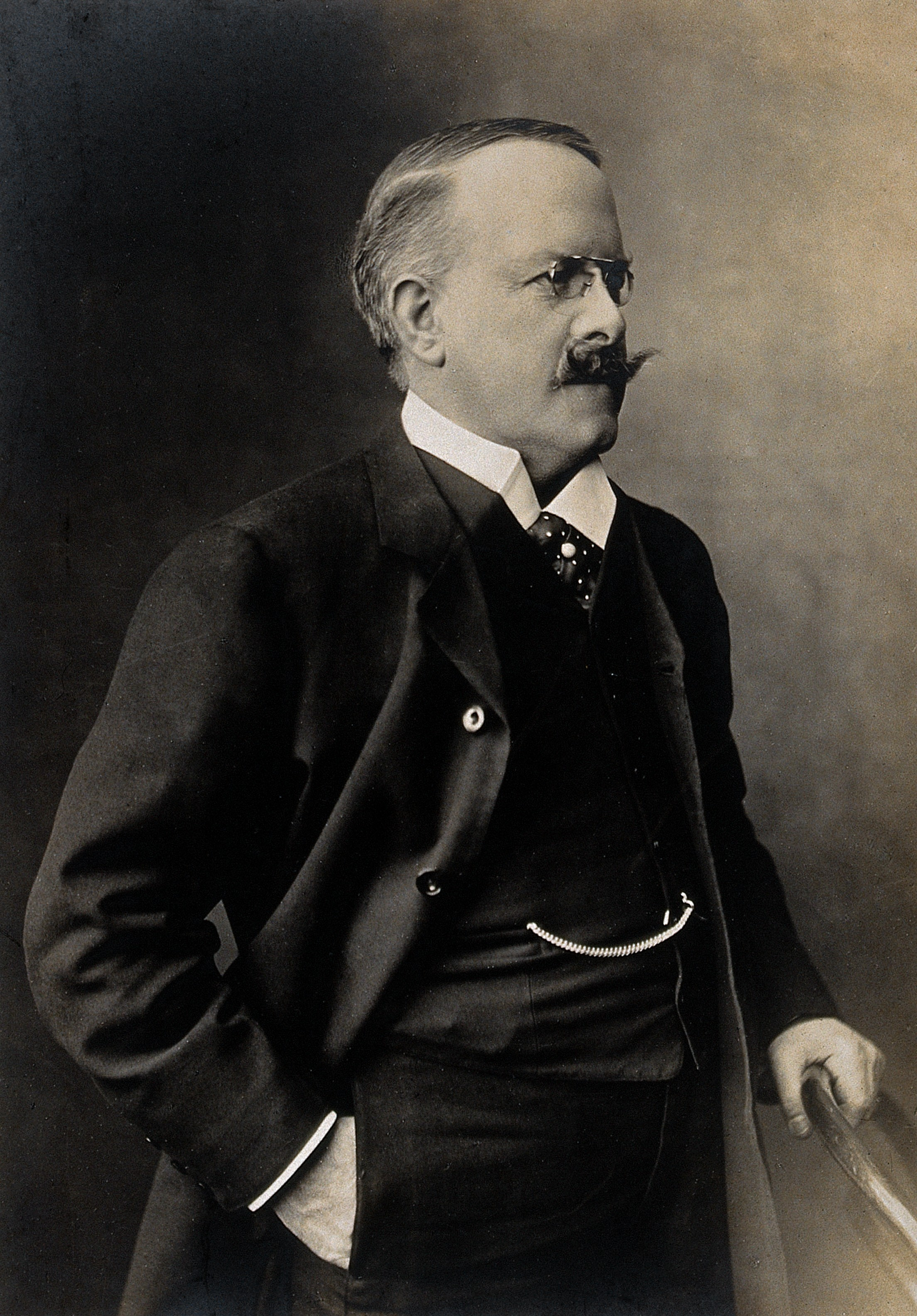
Thomas John Barnardo

Dr. Barnardo opened 18 Stepney Causeway in December 1870 as a home for working and homeless boys. The property was on a 99-year lease at £57 per year. The home housed 60 boys in 5 bedrooms. In 1908, 18 Stepney Causeway provided trade training and general education.

In 1871, an 11-year-old boy called John Somers (nicknamed "Carrots") was not taken in because the shelter was full. He was found dead two days later from malnutrition and exposure. Thomas decided not to limit the number of children he helped. From that time on the home bore the sign "No Destitute Boy Ever Refused Admission". The ever-open door at 10 Stepney Causeway opened in 1874 for homeless children. Number 10 stayed open until 1939 when Stepney was evacuated. It never re-opened after the war. Over the next few years Barnardo was to open several more buildings on Stepney Causeway.

On 19 April 1922, 260 boys marched out from Stepney to go to their new home The William Baker Memorial Technical School on Goldings estate, Hertford. The Prince of Wales, who later became King Edward VIII, opened the school officially on 17 November 1922.

The trade training section of the home closed in 1923 and it was used as a reception home and head office.

Stepney Causeway closed its doors for the last time in 1969 when the Barnardo's staff moved to their new headquarters at Barnardo House, Barkingside.
