= J. M. Barnardo & Son =

Coordinates: 53.34346°N 6.25951°W

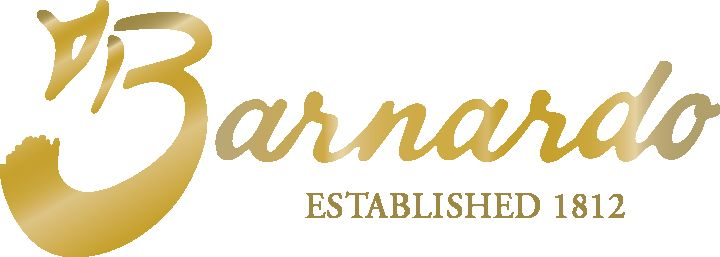

The owners of the furrier's shop J. M. Barnardo & Son in Dublin, Ireland, founded in 1812, already claimed the title of "oldest family of furriers in the world" in 1994.

== Company history ==
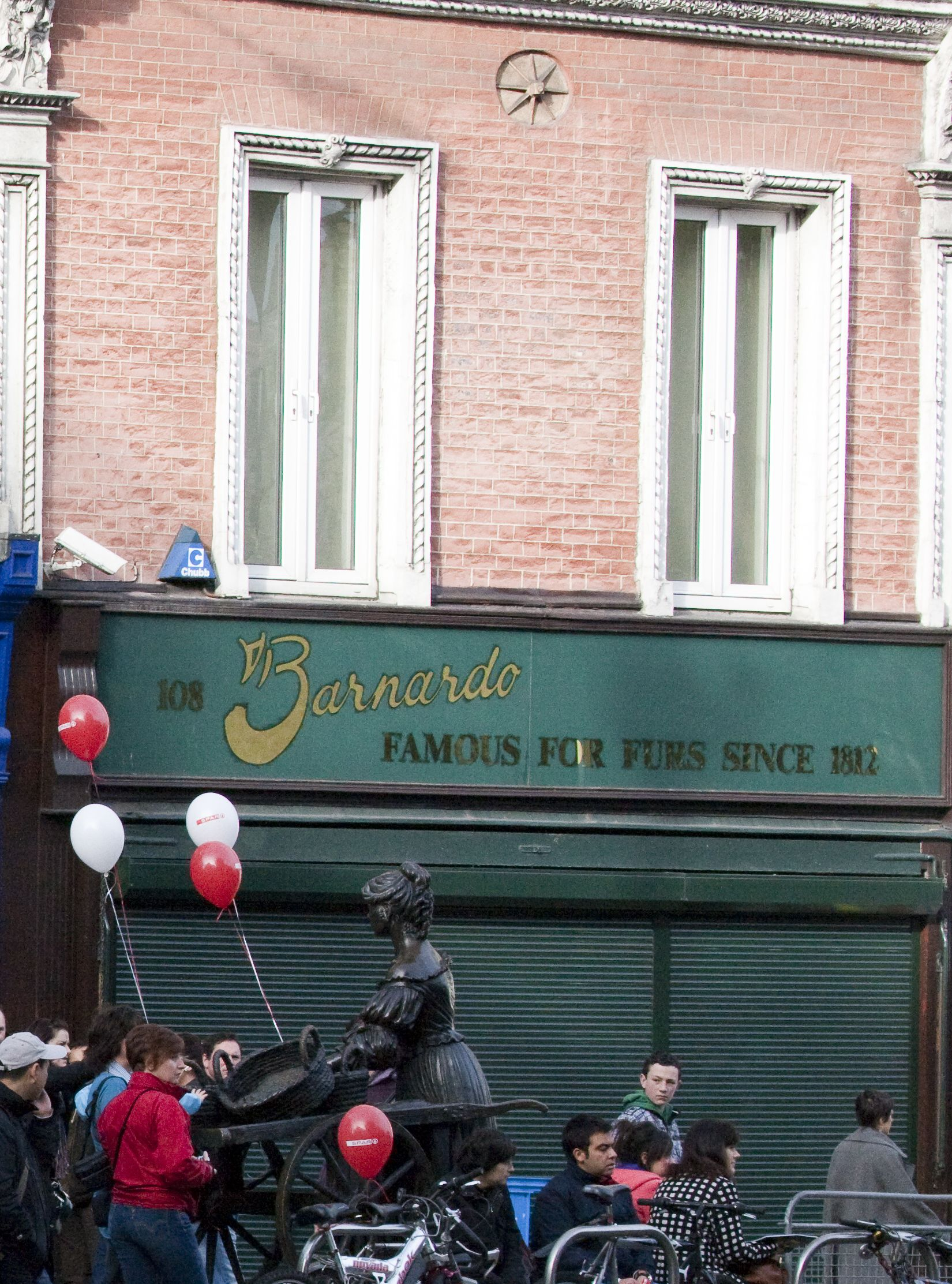
Shop Barnardo with shutters closed (2009, statue of fishmonger Molly Malone pictured is no longer in place)

Furrier John Michael[is] Barnardo opened his fur business in 1812 at 4 Dame Street, next to Dublin Castle. A register of residents from 1870 also gives the address of 36 Mary Street for the Lord Lieutenant's furrier, Henry Barnardo. A business directory of 1874 contains two Dublin retail furriers, B. Barnardo here addressing 78 Argyle Street.

Younger son Henry Lionel Barnardo (born 1847) took over the business when John Michelis Barnardo died in 1874. At that time, the company was so successful and respected that the company was allowed to bear the title of court furrier every year from 1832 onwards. Towards the end of 1874 Henry Lionel moved his family and business to Grafton Street. When this building burned down in 1882, he took the opportunity and organized a large, apparently very successful sale. The offer of "the best goods uninjured by the fire" offered fur-lined circular cloaks in every kind of Fur (sic) from 14/6d up, Fur Carriage rugs from £2.6.0d to 3gns, and Seal Bag Muffs, mounted in Nickel Silver Frames from 10/6d. On the corner of Duke Street and Grafton Street, he also opened a fashion store built specifically for this purpose. In 2023, the company, which has existed since 1812, surpassed the oldest German furrier's shop, Richard Förster, founded in Werdau in 1881.

Henry Cecil Barnardo took over the business in 1912, six months after his father's death, and ran it from 1922 together with his wife Ellen Josephine, who began working at the business at the age of 14. "She'd worked in the shop since she was 14," Elizabeth explains, "and was the serious business person in the relationship, running things while he went off to antique auctions and conducted the Dublin Philharmonic Orchestra. Her husband was known for his extraordinary generosity towards scroungers or beggars; Josephine was also generous, but of a more practical nature". Losing all their money in the Wall Street crash of 1929, the beginning of the Great Depression, they sold the second store and continued selling the acquired merchandise at 108 Grafton Street.

Henry Lionel Barnardo ran the company after his older brother Thomas John Barnardo went to London to become a doctor. Henry expanded the company significantly. It was passed into the next generation with Henry Cecil Barnardo. He designed the collections up until the 1920s.

He married late and his only son, Harry, creative like his ancestors, carried on the family business. Irish airline Aer Lingus was by then very prosperous and Barnardo began supplying stores in the US and abroad and hosting fur fashion shows in many different locations, Bermuda, Switzerland, France and America. He always engaged Irish models, Winnie Butler, Lady Antonia Wardell, Hilary Freyne, Rosemary Smyth and Adrienne Ring. He did the MC bit himself, reciting snatches of Percy French.

By the year they married, Harry Barnardo had acquired the Rohu furriers in Castlemarket, County Kilkenny, and his wife Caroline had taken over the management. She had already spent her engagement year in London, studying fur and business at the London College of Fashion. Harry Barnardo died in 1978 and Caroline took over his position at 108 Grafton Street.

As of November 2022, the business, long held at the head of Grafton Street, is being run by Harry's widow Caroline, fifth and sixth generations of her daughter Elizabeth (born 1972), Caroline and Harry's only child, and Elizabeth's son Harry. In 1994 Caroline had presented the New Seasons collection shows again at the Jurys Hotels in Limerick and Cork. According to a report in The Irish Times (2022 or earlier), Barnardo now exported his fur, shearling, leather and suede fashions all over the world. The company has its own workrooms, storage facilities and a refrigeration system for the summer storage of customer furs. Rohu is also still owned by the family in 2023.

Since the father died, the business has been in the hands of the two women. Elizabeth Barnardo has been helping out here every Saturday since she was 12 years old. In 1990 she studied design and business management at the London College of Fashion and since then, according to her own statement, has consistently produced her own designs. In 2003 Elisabeth said, later also very affected by the general decline in fur sales (not only in November 2014 did she have a demonstration by animal rights activists in front of her shop): "Today's customers are far more aware of trends, more travelled and able to buy anywhere in the world. We have to be the best to get business. I'm very proud of our name. When I go to auctions in Seattle and Copenhagen to buy skins, as I do four times a year, it doesn't matter how much I spent because the Barnardo name in trade and business holds good."

A photo from November 2013 shows the front of a small shop on a block with different buildings, the upper floors are still old English style, with a shop window and a recessed entrance. Remains of a stucco facade from the 19th century have been preserved. lightbox above the shop proclaims: "Barnardo – Famous for furs since 1812". Decorated were furs of different types and fur headgear. In contrast to the company's fur collections, which are fashionably up-to-date, other photos show traditional shop fittings with wooden cupboards and a small chandelier, and a staircase leads to the first floor. Some of the furs were on clothing racks.

A journalist reported of her visit to Barnardo in 2003: "We go upstairs, to a room of shining wood and mirrors, and I get a real feel of today's furs. Elizabeth and Caroline, gleefully and with confidence in their product, dress me in exotic, featherweight furs; a floor length Sapphire mink which reverses to become denim, a knitted mink jacket, an opera coat in bronze taffeta and multi-coloured dyed fox collar".

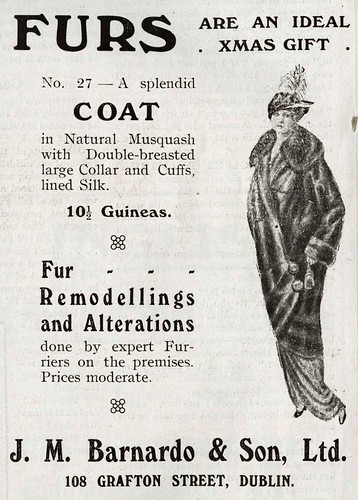
„Furs are an Ideal Xmas gift.“ Advertising, turn of the 20th century

== Family ==
The family history was researched and written by Olive Harris. Harris had started working in the shop by the age of 14, becoming a secretary at Barnardo's for three generations and returning to sales towards the end of her tenure at Barnardo.

John Michael Barnardo from Havelberg, Germany, came to England via Hamburg. He had a big family. One of his sons, Thomas John Barnardo (born 1845 as 13th child; died 1905), became very well known; he founded the British charity Barnardo's in 1866, which looked after children at risk. Thomas Barnardo was one of 13 children born to John and Abigail.

Elizabeth Barnardo, owner in 2003, reported: "The first Barnardo, John Michaelis, arrived in Ireland in 1810 in a fishing boat off the Clare coast. As far as we could know, the family is originally from Venice but moved to Germany. During his stay in Clare he met and fell in love with Elizabeth O'Brien. He returned to Germany but came back here in 1812 and married Elizabeth, went to Dublin and opened a fur shop at 4 Dame Street. It is said that he was a taxidermist by trade".

The family descends from European immigrants of German nationality and Spanish-Jewish origin, John Michaelis Barnardo and his Irish wives Elizabeth (who died in childbirth) and Elizabeth's sister Abigail, whom he married as a widow. John Michaelis Barnardo was naturalized in 1860. Thomas Barnardo was one of John and Abigail's children.

Henry Lionel Barnardo was affectionate with Ellen Josephine McDonald, who was then working in the shop. She had previously worked up the road at the Bewley's Oriental Café on Grafton Street, but they had met through a shared passion for badminton. Caroline recalled self-deprecatingly: "He was one of the most eligible bachelors of his time and 20 years older than me. He just persevered and waited for me to grow up!” The father disapproved of this in-house liaison and sent his son to Canada, where he worked as a lumberjack. Henry Cecil returned in 1912, six months after his father's death, took over the business and remained associated with Ellen Josephine. Ten years later, in 1922, they were married at St Andrew's Church, Andrew Street. Henry Cecil Barnardo and Ellen Josephine were 43 and 44 years old respectively at the time of their marriage.

== Reminiscence ==
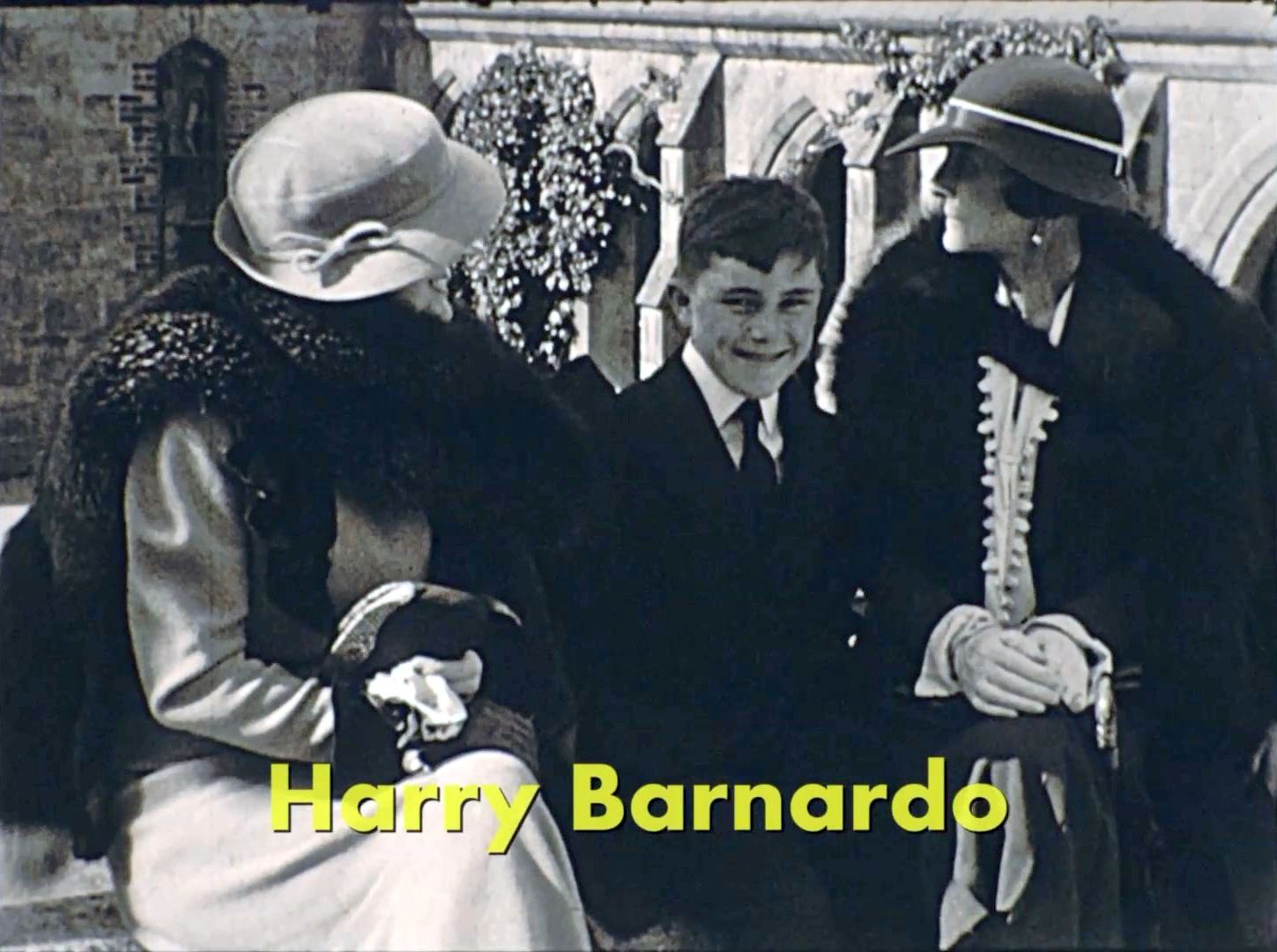
St. Columba's College student Harry Barnardo and family members, in his father's film

During a 2018 research for a school magazine, three 16mm films were discovered in the attic of the Barnardo building. The digital transformation of the films made by Henry Lionel Barnardo has unearthed an exceptional amount of material from the 1930s on school life at the time, the opening of buildings, the visit of Ireland's first President, Douglas Hyde, and more. Harry Barnardo is twice tagged with captions, other family members may be identified by their fur scarves and fur collars. An edited and subtitled selection is available online as a compilation.

== See also ==
- Williams & Son, Dublin
