= Williams & Son, Dublin =

Coordinates: 53.3440°N 6.2666°W

Williams & Son
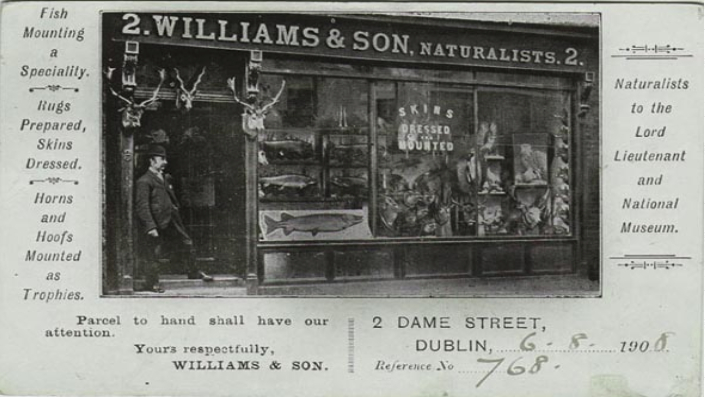
- Williams & Son's shop at 2 Dame Street in 1908
- Company type: Private
- Industry: Retail
- Headquarters: 2 Dame Street, Dublin, Ireland
- Area served: Ireland
- Products: Taxidermy
- Owner: Alexander Williams

Williams & Son, Dublin was a taxidermy firm which operated in Dublin, Ireland from the late 1860s to the early 1940s.

== History ==
Williams & Son was a firm of taxidermists which was founded by the Williams family in the late 1860s. William Williams' sons Alexander (1846–1930) and Edward (1848–1905) started the business. They first were known under the name "A. & D. [an evident misprint] Williams, naturalists," as shown in an entry of Thom's Directory of 1872.

Father William Williams (1813–1901), who was born in Dublin, had run a hatmaking business in Drogheda. Alexander and his younger brother assisted in the shop. Both the father and his sons were keen bird-hunters and learned to skin and stuff their captures. William Williams learnt basic taxidermy from Mr. Evatt of Mount Louise, County Monaghan, and he taught his sons.

In 1860 the family moved from Drogheda to Dublin. At first William Williams' business was in Westmoreland Street, but in 1866 a big fire broke out at the premises. It is not impossible that chemicals that were used by Alexander and Edward for their first taxidermy-activities, like naphtha, had kindled the fire. The shop was completely ruined and Williams was obliged to move. The business was then settled in Bachelor's Walk. A year later, in 1867 Alice, William's wife, died.

About 1870 the shop moved again, now to 2 Dame Street, close to City Hall and directly opposite the entrance to Crow Street in Temple Bar. For some time both businesses, the hatters and the birders, now operated side by side.

Later, also the younger brother Willie (William John), and his son Teddy, joined the taxidermy business.

Among their clients was the Natural History Museum, Dublin, which still have a large array of their work on display today including the diorama of a badger set in the Irish Room. The Limerick Museum also holds a diorama of puffins from Williams & Son. Edward in particular was lauded for his mounts of birds. He was also a close acquaintance of the Natural History Museum's curator, A.G. More, and helped to secure rare Irish specimens for the Museum from his private clients. As well as taxidermy, they also mounted other zoological specimens, such as a pair of thylacine skulls from the collection of Sir Thomas Grattan Esmonde.

With the successive deaths of the Williams' brothers, the business closed in the early 1940s.

== Legacy ==
In the 21st century, the work of Williams & Son has become sought after in the Irish antiques market.

== Gallery ==
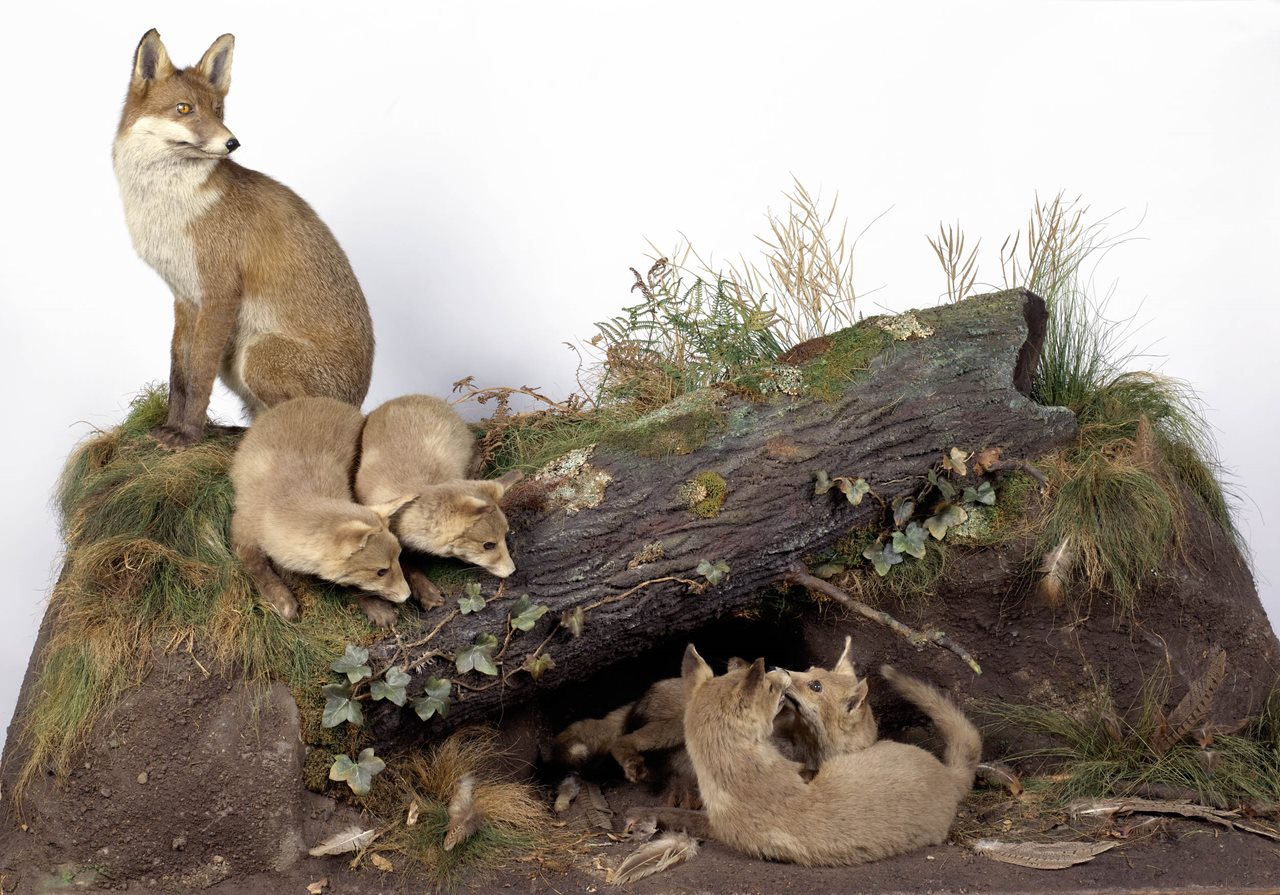
Taxidermy diorama of a red fox vixen with four cubs (1910) in the Natural History Museum, Dublin

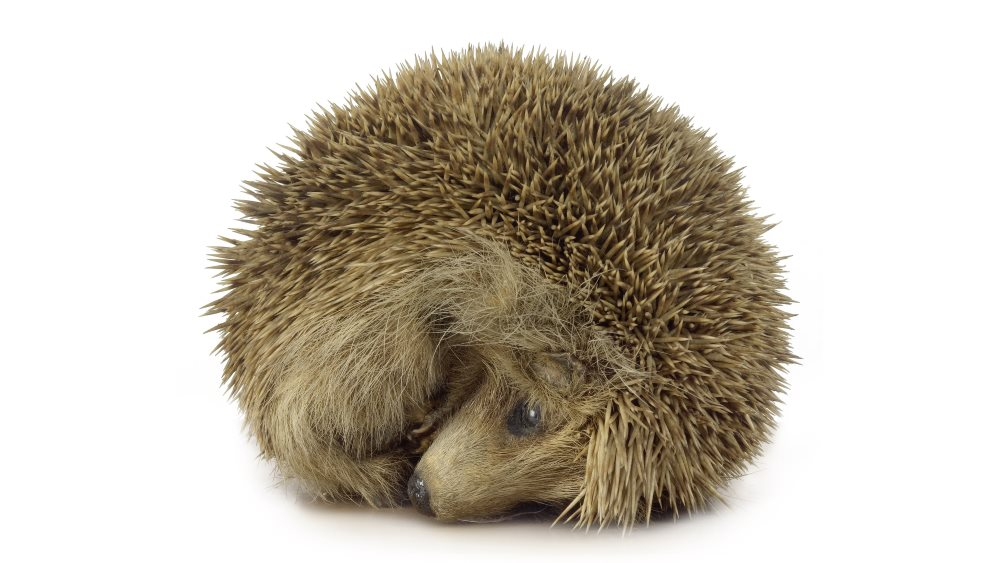
Hedgehog from Lismore, County Waterford (1898) in the Natural History Museum, Dublin

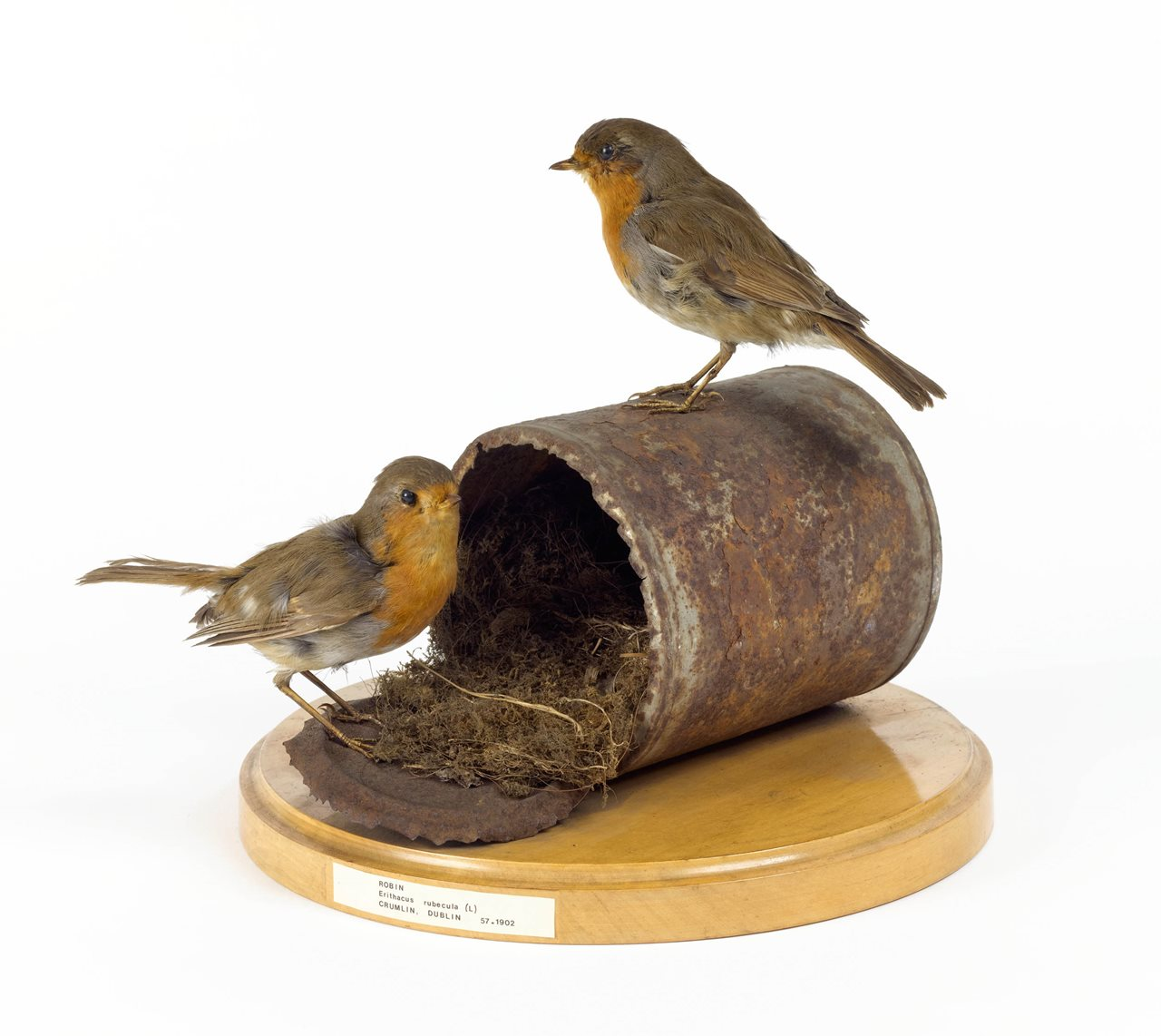
Pair of European Robins nesting in a tin can (1911) in the Natural History Museum, Dublin

== See also ==
- J. M. Barnardo & Son

== Sources ==
- Ledbetter, G. (2010). Privilege & poverty: The life & times of Irish painter & naturalist Alexander Williams RHA, 1846-1930. Cork: Collins Press. OCLC 639207165.

see also: Murray, Peter (23 October 2010). "Privilege and Poverty: The Life and Times of Irish Painter & Naturalist Alexander Williams RHA 1846-1930". Irish Examiner. Archived from the original on 2 February 2021.

- Hutchinson, Clive (1998). "Bird Study in Ireland". In Foster, John Wilson; Chesney, Helena C. G. (eds.). Nature in Ireland : a scientific and cultural history. Dublin: The Lilliput Press. p. 265. ISBN 9780773518179.
