= James P. O'Connor =

Irish entomologist

James Patrick O'Connor is an Irish entomologist and a member of the Royal Irish Academy. He is an alumnus of the National University of Ireland (BSc 1970, PhD 1975). From 1988 to 2000, he was the keeper of the Natural History Museum in Dublin. He is the editor of the Bulletin of the Irish Biogeographical Society. (Note: Bull. Ir. Biogeogr. Soc. ISSN 0332-1185 OCLC 14151931)

== Selected works ==
- O'Connor, James P.; Ashe, Patrick (2000). Irish indoor insects : a guide to Irish indoor insect pests. Illustrated by Sean Milne. Dublin: Town House. ISBN 978-1-86059-095-5.
- O'Connor, James P.; Nelson, Brian (2012). An Annotated Checklist of the Irish Hemiptera and Small Orders (PDF). Irish Biogeographical Society. ISBN 978-0-9550806-7-8.
- O'Connor, James P. (2015). A Catalogue and Atlas of the Caddisflies (Trichoptera) of Ireland (PDF). Irish Biogeographical Society. ISBN 978-0-9550806-8-5.
- O'Connor, James P. (2023). Bibliography of Irish Insects (1802-2020) (PDF). Irish Biogeographical Society. ISBN 978-1-9164218-3-7.
