= Thomas John Barnardo =

Philanthropist, founder and director of homes for poor children (1845-1905)

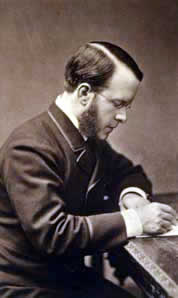
- Born: 4 July 1845; Dublin, Ireland
- Died: 19 September 1905 (aged 60); London, England
- Occupation: Philanthropist
- Known for: Founder and Director of Barnardo's
- Spouse: Sara Louise Elmslie
- Children: 7, including Syrie Maugham

Thomas John Barnardo (4 July 1845 – 19 September 1905) was an Irish Christian philanthropist and founder and director of homes for poor and deprived children. From the foundation of the first Barnardo's home in 1867 to the date of Barnardo's death, nearly 60,000 children had been taken in.

Although Barnardo never finished his studies at the London Hospital, he used the title of 'doctor' and later secured a licentiate.

== Early life ==
Barnardo was born in Dublin, Ireland (then part of the United Kingdom of Great Britain and Ireland), in 1845. He was the fourth of five children (one died in childbirth) of John Michaelis Barnardo, a furrier who was of Sephardic Jewish descent, and his second wife, Abigail, an Englishwoman and member of the Plymouth Brethren.

Sometime before his first marriage in 1827 to Elizabeth O'Brien, John Michaelis emigrated from Prussia via Hamburg to Dublin, where he established a business; he married twice and fathered children with both wives. The Barnardo family "traced its origin to Venice, followed by conversion to the Lutheran Church in the sixteenth century". Barnardo wrote that, as a child, he was selfish and thought that everything that was not his should belong to him. However, as he grew older, he abandoned this mindset in favour of helping people experiencing poverty.

Barnardo moved to London in 1866. It was during this time that he became interested in becoming a missionary. Barnardo, alongside three other men, made it his mission to evangelize England. He preached to poor people living in the city about Christianity and the salvation it had to offer. While doing so, Thomas John Barnardo realized that the children were much more willing to accept his message, whereas adults were more stubborn and weren't ready to change the way they were living. This realization then gave way to Barnardo's mindset, in which he began to blame the parents of the children for not raising them in an honorable Christian way. Barnardo thought that evangelizing children would be the best way to grow the Church, so the poor children of England became Barnardo's sole focus of his evangelization and philanthropic efforts.

== Philanthropy ==
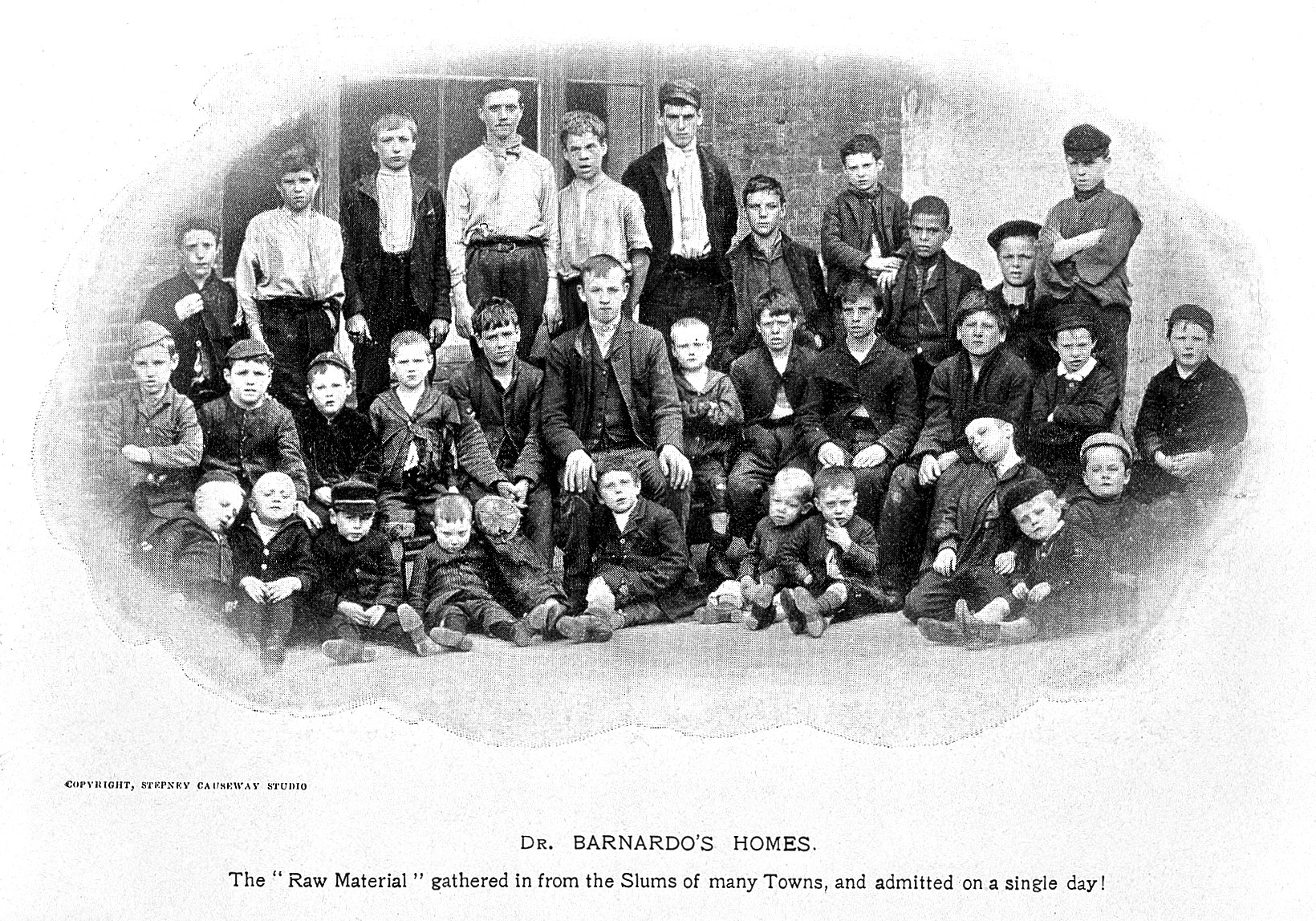
Group portrait of children outside a Barnardo home

Barnardo established 'Hope Place' ragged school in the East End of London in 1868, his first attempt at aiding the estimated 30,000 'destitute' children in Victorian London. Many of these children were not only impoverished but orphaned, as the result of a recent cholera outbreak. For those unable to afford private education, the school offered education which although Christian-based, was not exclusively religion-focused, and worked to provide tutelage on various common trades of that time (for example, newsboys and shoe-shiners).

In 1870, Barnardo was prompted to form a boys' orphanage at 18 Stepney Causeway after inspecting the conditions within which London's orphaned population slept. This was the first of 122 such establishments, caring for over 8,500 children, founded before he died in 1905. Significant provisions were available to occupants; infants/younger children were sent to rural districts in an attempt to protect them from industrial pollution, and teenagers were trained in skills such as carpentry and metal work, to provide them a form of basic financial stability.

Barnardo's homes did not just accommodate boys; in 1876, the 'Girls' Village Home' in Barkingside was established, and by 1905, accommodated 1,300 girls who were trained for 'domestic occupation'. Another establishment, the 'rescue home for girls in serious danger', aimed to protect girls from the growing tide of child prostitution.

In addition to the various homes and schools established by Barnardo and his wife, Sara Louise Elmslie, a seaside retreat and hospital were also founded.

From the foundation of the homes in 1867 to Barnardo's death, nearly 60,000 children had been taken in, most being trained and placed out in life. At his death, his charity cared for over 8,500 children in 96 homes.

== Personal life ==
In June 1873, Barnardo married Sara Louise Elmslie (1842–1944), known as Syrie, the daughter of an underwriter for Lloyd's of London. Syrie shared her husband's interests in evangelism and social work. The couple settled at Mossford Lodge, Essex, where they had seven children, three of whom died in early childhood. A fourth child, Marjorie, had Down syndrome.

One daughter, Gwendolyn Maud Syrie (1879–1955), known as Syrie like her mother, was married to wealthy businessman Henry Wellcome, and later to the writer Somerset Maugham, and became a socially prominent London interior designer.

Barnardo died of angina pectoris in London on 19 September 1905, and was buried in front of Cairns House, Barkingside, Essex. The house is now the head office of the children's charity he founded, Barnardo's. A memorial stands outside Cairn's House.

=== Alleged Jack the Ripper suspect ===
At the time of the Whitechapel murders, due to the supposed medical expertise of Jack the Ripper, various doctors in the area were suspected. Long after his death, Barnardo was named a possible suspect by Donald McCormick (1970) and Gary Rowlands (2005).

There is no evidence that Barnardo committed the murders, and critics of this theory have also pointed out that his age and appearance did not match any of the descriptions of the Ripper. Barnardo was well known in the East End, however, and would visit cheap boarding houses to talk to underprivileged customers. During one of these visits, he spoke to a group at 32 Flower and Dean Street, Whitechapel, during the period of the murders. One of the women drunkenly cried, 'We're all up to no good and no-one cares what becomes of us; perhaps some of us will be killed next.' He later viewed the body of Elizabeth Stride, Jack the Ripper's third canonical victim, at the mortuary and confirmed that she had been among those present.

== Legacy – Barnardo's ==
After Barnardo's death, a national memorial was instituted to form a fund of £250,000 to relieve the various institutions of all financial liability and permanently place the entire work. William Baker, formerly the chairman of the council, was selected to succeed the founder of the homes as honorary director. Barnardo was the author of 192 books dealing with the charitable work to which he devoted his life.

Barnardo's work was carried on by his many supporters under the name Dr Barnardo's Homes. Following societal changes in the mid-20th century, the charity changed its focus from the direct care of children to fostering and adoption, renaming itself Dr Barnardo's. Following the closure of its last traditional orphanage in 1989, it took the still simpler name of Barnardo's.

=== Controversies ===
There was controversy early on with Barnardo's work. Specifically, he was accused of kidnapping children without their parents' permission and of falsifying photographs of children to make the distinction between the period before they were rescued by Barnardo's and afterwards seem more dramatic. He openly admitted to the former of these charges, describing it as 'philanthropic abduction' and basing his defence on the idea that the end justified the means. This 'philanthropic abduction' strategy resulted in thousands of children being taken from their families and sent to other countries governed by Britain. Barnardo claimed this was an act of justice because he deemed the children's home life so poor. By relocating the kids, Barnardo thought he was bettering British society and improving the lives of the children. In total, he was taken to court on 88 occasions, usually on the charge of kidnapping. However, being a charismatic speaker and popular figure, he rode through these scandals unscathed. Other charges brought against him included presenting staged images of children for Barnardo's 'before and after' cards and neglecting basic hygiene for the children under his care.

Due to this widespread controversy and popular criticism from institutions such as the Roman Catholic Church, Barnardo was required to explain each child's background story and provide justification for taking them in. He kept track of these reasons in books known as the précis books. Within these books were extremely detailed descriptions of each child's appearance. Skin, hair, and eye color, height, and every scratch and dark spot on the skin was documented. Then Barnardo noted what each child was wearing, with in-depth descriptions of its condition. It is thought that Barnardo was using this strategy to emphasize the before-and-after transformation of the children living in Barnardo's Homes, however, these methods fell under extreme scrutiny, as it appeared to some people that he was objectifying the children to further his philanthropic agenda.

=== The charity today ===
The official mascot of Barnardo's is a bear called Barney. Queen Elizabeth II was Barnardo's Patron from 1983 to 2016, when she handed over the role to The Duchess of Cornwall, who is now Queen Camilla. Its chief executive is Lynn Perry.

== See also ==
- The Likes of Us
- Charitable organization
- Orphanage
- Ragged School Museum
- List of Freemasons
