= William Andrews (naturalist) =

William Andrews (1802 – 11 March 1880) was an English naturalist.

Andrews was born in Chichester, but is chiefly known in connection with Irish natural history. He was one of the earliest members, and subsequently secretary and president, of the Dublin Natural History Society, in the proceedings of which he took a very active part. He at first devoted his attention to botany, but subsequently took up marine ichthyology, in which branch of science he made some important discoveries: he also published papers on ornithology and entomology. He distributed many botanical specimens, many of which were taken from plants cultivated in his garden, and hence accidental mistakes as to their origin not infrequently arose. His name is best known to botanists in connection with a variety (Andrewsii) of the Killarney fern (Trichomanes radicans). He died in Dublin on 11 March 1880.
