= National Museum of Ireland – Natural History =

Specialised museum in Dublin, Ireland

- Ard-Mhúsaem na hÉireann – Stair an Dúlra
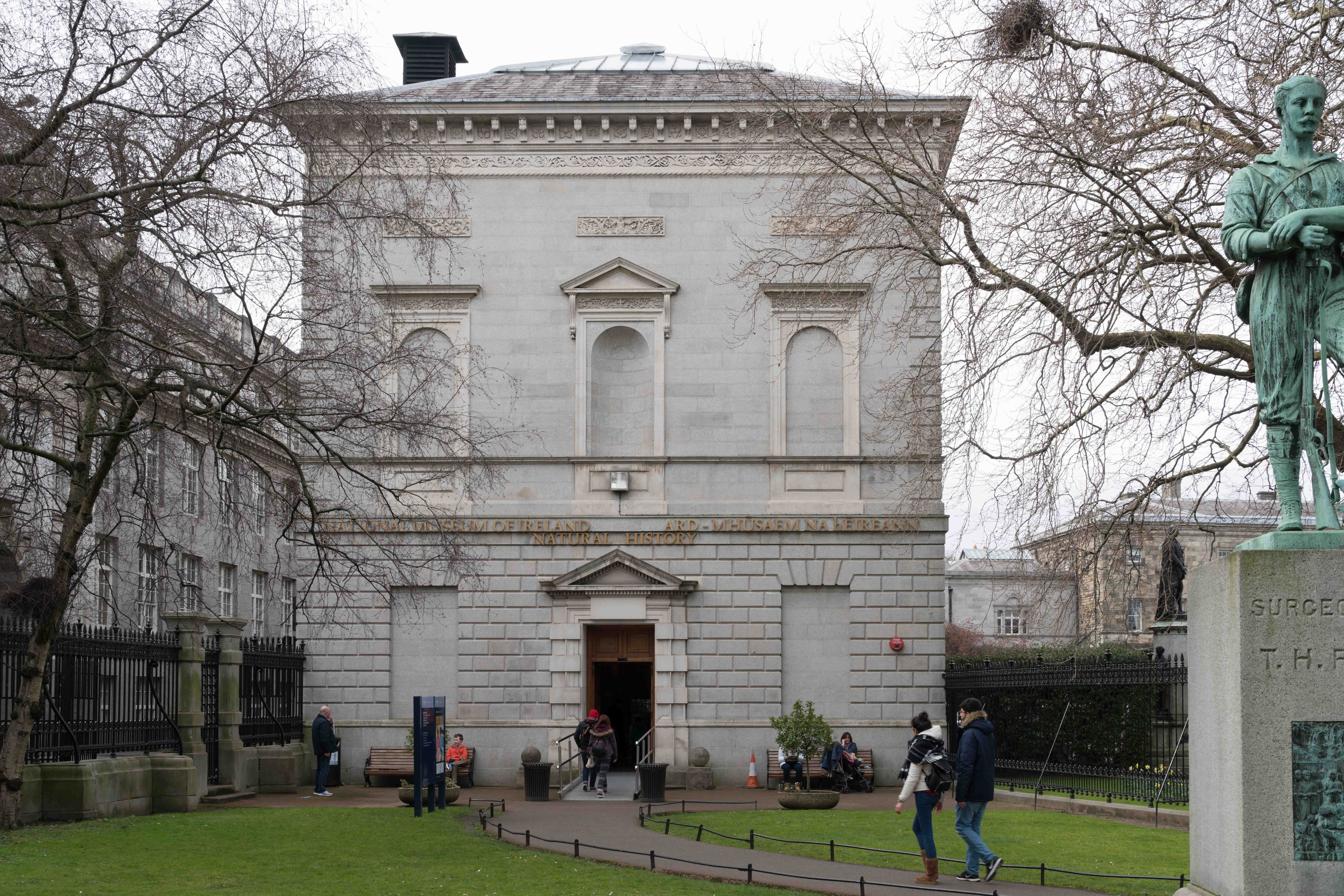
- Entrance to the museum

- Location of the museum in Dublin
- Established: 1856
- Location: Merrion Street, Dublin, Ireland
- Coordinates: 53.33976°N 6.252997°W
- Type: National museum
- Visitors: 387,412
- Curator: Paolo Viscardi (acting Keeper)
- Public transit access: St Stephen's Green; Dublin Pearse; Dublin Bus routes: 25, 25a, 44, 61, 66, 67
- Website: National Museum of Ireland - Natural History

National Museum of Ireland network
- Archaeology; Decorative Arts & History; Country Life; Natural History

The National Museum of Ireland – Natural History (Irish: Ard-Mhúsaem na hÉireann – Stair an Dúlra), sometimes called the Dead Zoo, a branch of the National Museum of Ireland, is housed on Merrion Street in Dublin, Ireland. The museum was built in 1856 for parts of the collection of the Royal Dublin Society and the building and collection were later passed to the State.

The Natural History Collection comprised sub-collections for zoology, geology and botany; the geological collections have largely been held in storage from the 1960s, and the botanical collection was moved to National Botanic Gardens in 1970. However, the museum's zoological collection, and its building, have changed little since Victorian times, and it is sometimes described as a "museum of a museum" or a "stately home of death".

Admission has been free of charge for decades, and attendance grew from 106,000 in 2007 to over 336,000 in 2017, and 388,000 in 2019, despite chronic staff shortages, and two of its four floors being closed since 2007. After temporary closures due to the COVID-19 pandemic, the museum closed in November 2020 for an indefinite period for major renovations, with the collections being moved over a period of around ten months, as detailed on an official museum Twitter channel. The ground floor reopened in August 2022 but will close when the main renovations commence. The work featured in a television documentary The Dead Zoo in 2022.

== Collection and exhibits ==
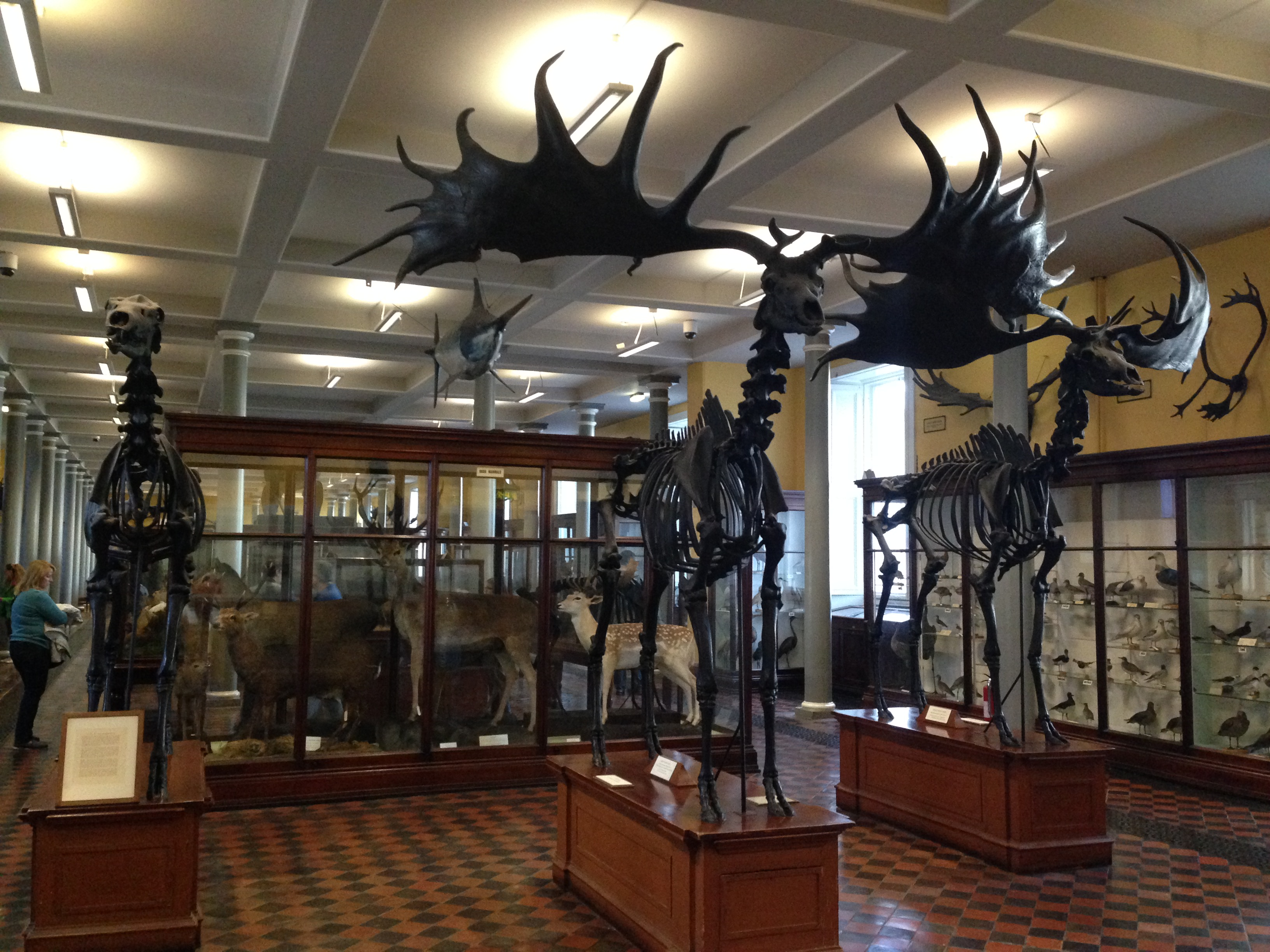
The giant Irish deer in the Irish Room on the ground floor

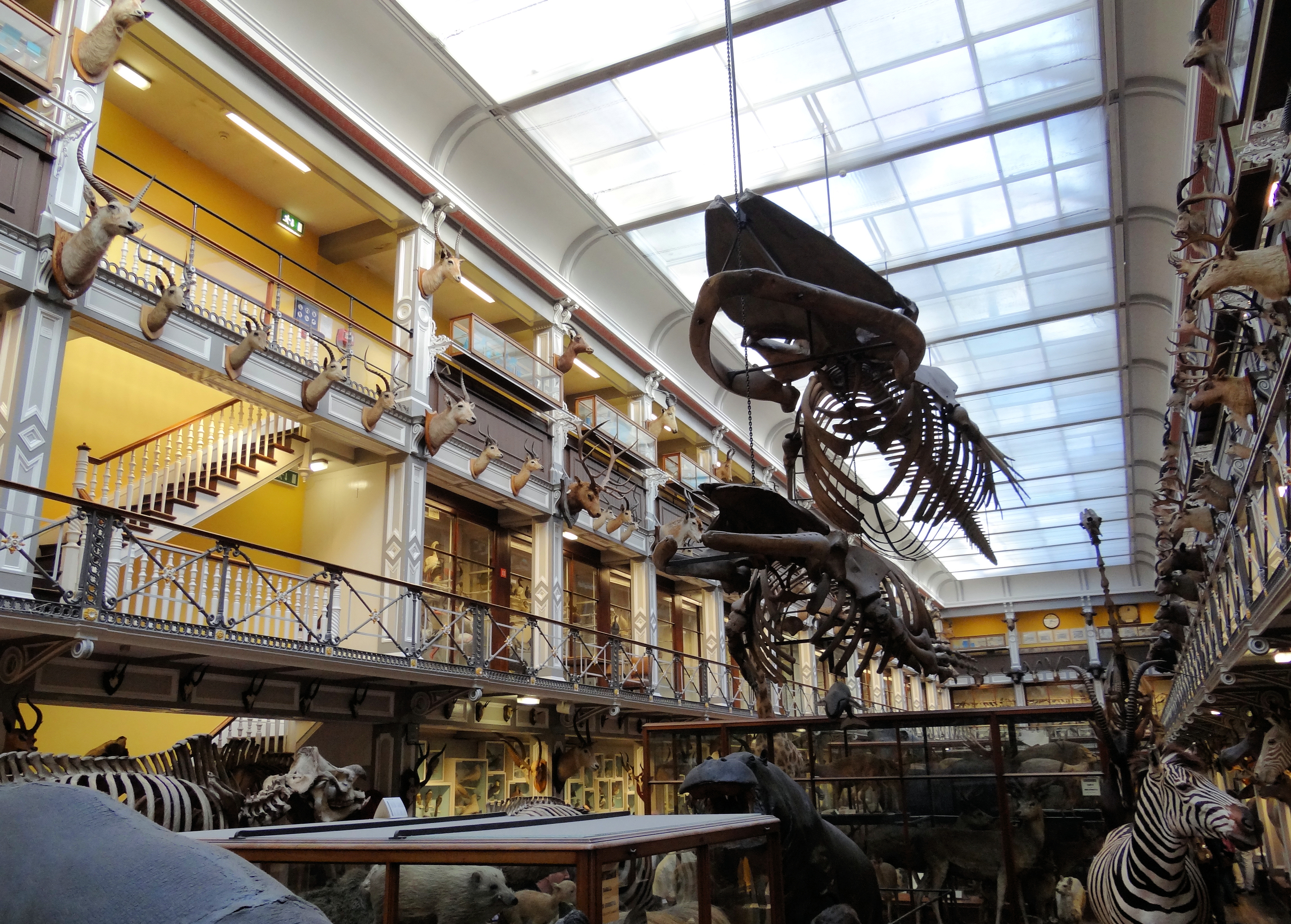
A view from the lower section of the first floor

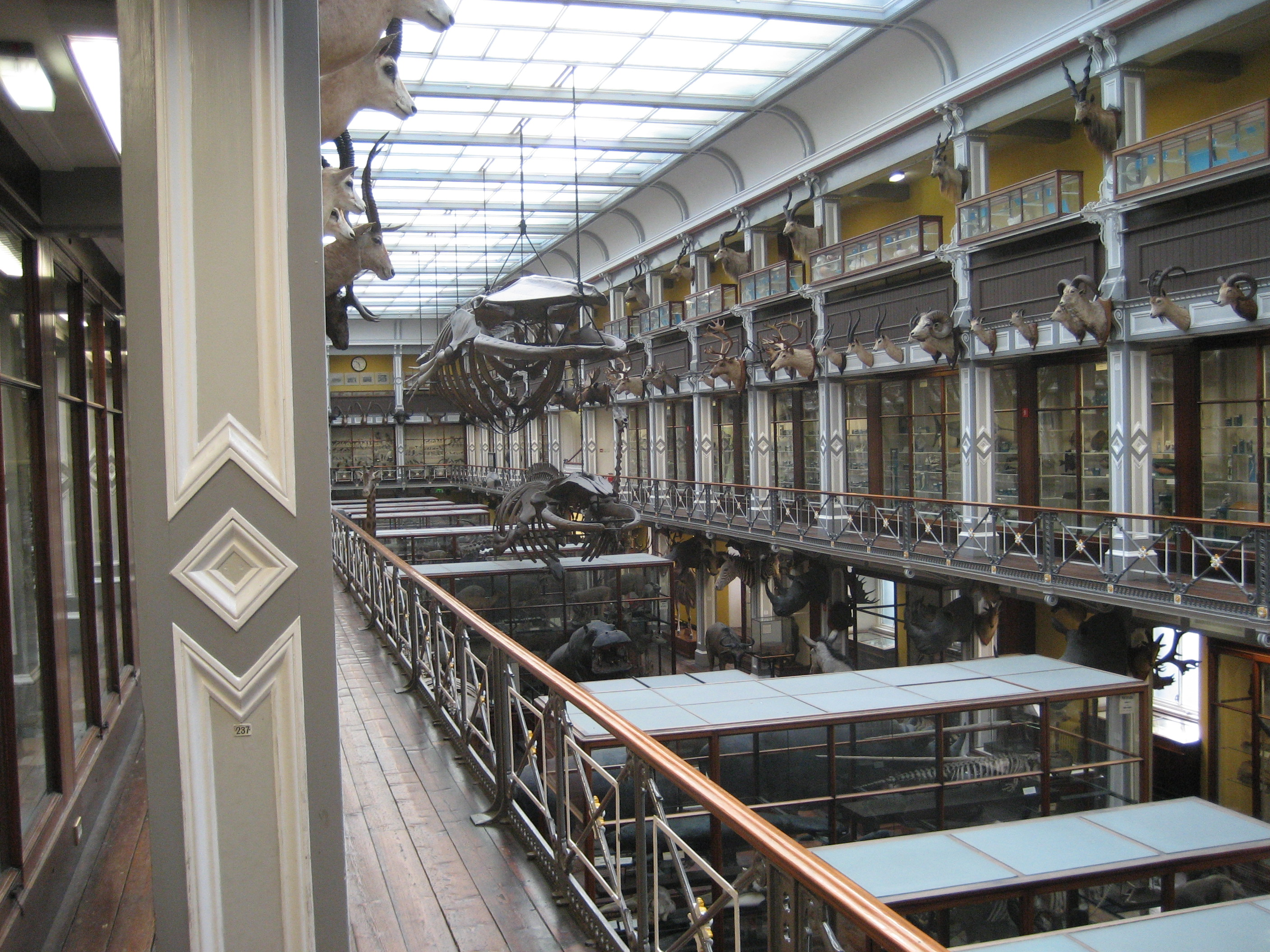
Galleries, closed 2007, and as of late 2023 still not open for visitors

The Natural History Collection comprises over 2 million items in the fields of zoology and geology, a million of the specimens being insects. There was previously also a botanical collection but this was transferred to the National Botanic Gardens in 1970.

As with many other natural history museums, the majority of specimens are not on display, for example the entirety of the geological collections. In 1962, a building known as "the Annexe", which housed the main geological displays, was demolished to make way for the Dáil Éireann restaurant and office; this led to these collections being placed in storage in buildings in Beggars Bush and elsewhere, and most have remained in storage since then. A selection from the geological collections was placed on display in the National Museum of Ireland site at Collins Barracks, this exhibition being opened on 27 September 2021 for 18 months.

Among the many scientists who have studied the collections, Stephen Jay Gould did an essay based on the Irish elk in the museum.

=== Display and exhibitions ===
The museum building is a ‘cabinet-style’ museum designed to showcase a wide-ranging and comprehensive zoological collection, and has changed little in over a century. Often described as a "museum of a museum" or a "stately home of death" the exhibitions display 10,000 specimens from around the world. An online virtual exhibition of the interior is available on the museum website, showing the building before it was emptied for building works.

The Irish Room, the ground floor of the museum, displays Irish animals, notably several mounted skeletons of giant Irish deer. Numerous skulls of those and other deer line the walls. Stuffed and mounted mammals, birds, fish — and insects and other animals native to or found in Ireland — comprise the rest of the ground floor. Many of the specimens of currently extant animals, such as badgers, hares, and foxes, are over a century old. A basking shark hangs from this ceiling. This grouping of Irish fauna in one room dates from 1910, when the collections were arranged by geography rather than purely taxonomy.

The first floor contains mammals from around the world, including extinct or endangered species, including in turn a thylacine, and a pygmy hippopotamus. Also on display is the polar bear shot by Admiral Sir Francis Leopold McClintock. Many of the mounted specimens were purchased from or donated by the Royal Zoological Gardens, Dublin. Part of the large collection of Irish birds bequeathed by Richard Barrington is mounted along one wall.

The Lower gallery, closed to general access since 2007, contains bird specimens from around the world. Above this, the second ceiling suspends a humpback whale and fin whale skeleton. This floor includes a composite dodo skeleton, from Mauritius.

The Upper gallery, also closed since 2007, displays invertebrate and marine specimens including the Museum's collection of Glass Sea Creatures made by the glass artists Leopold and Rudolf Blaschka (the makers of Harvard's famous Glass Flowers collection). Numerous game heads can be seen mounted on pillars from the first floors up to the upper gallery, many of which were presented to the museum in the 1930s.

== History ==
=== 1786–1850s ===
The museum was built in 1786 to house the Royal Dublin Society's growing collections, which had expanded continually since the late 18th century. From 1786 the collections grew through the work of 'itinerant mineralogist' Donald Stewart. In 1792 the Society purchased the collection of Nathaniel Gottfried Leske under the instruction of Richard Kirwan. Leske's collection was one of Europe's largest natural history collections. From this core collection, the Professor of Mineralogy in the RDS, Karl Ludwig Giesecke, expanded the collection by travelling Ireland and internationally including Greenland.

The museum in Leinster House opened to the public two days a week from 1832, having been previously the private museum of the members of the RDS. Foreseeing that the museum might become a national museum, in 1836 a special Parliamentary Committee determined that the public should have greater access, which would require a larger building. By 1850, with visitor numbers reaching 44,000, there were complaints of the cramped conditions during the restrictive public visiting hours of two days a week, nine months out of twelve. Alexander Carte was appointed curator, and then director, of the Natural History Museum, and oversaw a period of expansion of the collections, with the aim of making the museum more representative of geological and zoological diversity both nationally and internationally. Carte also began organising the exhibitions and collections into groups pertaining to Ireland, and then international specimens. He reorganised the insect collections, documenting the damage and loss of specimens that had occurred in the Leskean collection. As part of his strategy to encourage more donations, Carte published lists of the acquisitions and donors in the new Journal of the Royal Dublin Society.

=== 1850s–1870s ===
In 1853 the Society began plans for the new museum building by applying for a grant from the Treasury, partly in compensation for the building the RDS had handed over to Board of Trade which was to become the New School of Design. A grant of £5000 was made available, with a further £2500 to be raised by public subscription. This resulted in the building which still houses the Natural History Museum today. It was originally built as an extension to Leinster House, where the Royal Dublin Society was based from 1815 until 1922.

The building was designed by architect Frederick Clarendon in harmony with the National Gallery of Ireland on the other side of Leinster Lawn. The frame of the building is cast iron, largely clad internally with timber on the upper floors. The exterior uses dressed granite and Portland stone.

The foundation stone was laid on 15 March 1856 by Earl Carlisle, the Lord Lieutenant of Ireland, and the building was completed in 1857 by contractors Gilbert Cockburn & Son. It was connected to Leinster House by a curved closed Corinthian colonnade, which once held displays of the Geological Survey of Ireland. The connection of the buildings allowed a visitor to move from Leinster House to the Museum building, and was eventually connected with the purpose built museum on Kildare Street.

The new museum building was opened in August 1857. The first event was a Conversazione on 27 August attended by 1500 including Earl Carlisle. On 31 August the explorer David Livingstone delivered a lecture in the museum.

The first exhibitions were mounted on the first floor and consisted of plants from the Botanic Gardens, Kiltorcan fossils, some birds donated by Carte, edible crustaceans and molluscs, Irish lepidoptera collected by Rev Greene, and fossils and birds collected by McClintock in the Arctic regions. There was also a selection of scientific instruments on display, along with some of the Society's library books. The ground floor hosted an area for refreshments for the attendees of the lectures.

While Dublin awaited the building of a National Gallery, the Natural History Museum hosted an exhibition of Decorative Art from Easter Monday 1858 which was opened by Earl of Eglinton. The exhibition was viewed by 55,000 over 11 weeks. Due to Carte's efforts in soliciting donations, the collections expanded considerably in the 1860s, but the Society only spent £373 on purchasing specimens. In the early 1860s much of the collection was not on display due to a lack of funds to prepare them for exhibition, and owing to the fact the ground floor of the new museum building was not completed, lacking heating and a permanent floor surface. Samuel Haughton arranged part of the mineralogical collection for display.

In 1864, the RDS held an "Exhibition of Manufactures" in a purpose-built building. Known as the Shelbourne Hall, it became an annexe of the museum, housing the fossil hall and staff facilities. By 1867 the museum was open 4 days a week, and undertook to open for one evening every week. Due to the success of the evening opening it then remained open for two evenings each week. At this time the idea of Sunday openings was suggested, but did not happen until 1884. In 1870 the museum was visited by 103,237 members of the public.

=== 1870s–1920 ===
From 1868 to 1876 the Government began to look at creating a policy for science and art in Ireland. It was proposed that relevant institutions should be founded and built, such as a Science and Art Museum, a National Gallery, a National Library, a School of Art, and museums dedicated to Natural History and Irish Antiquities, all on one site. On 18 November 1876 the RDS received a letter from the Secretary to the Treasury, William H. Smith, stating that there was an intention to obtain an Act of Parliament which would “vest all the buildings and land now held by the Royal Dublin Society in the Government” to allow “the State the requisite control over property and buildings upon which a large amount of public money is to be expended.” The Society was amenable to this, and relevant compensation was decided upon.

On 14 August 1877 ownership of the Museum and its collections was transferred to the State by an act of parliament. The new institution, under the directorship of William Edward Steele, was known as the Museum of Science and Art, Dublin. New funding was provided for a new museum building on Kildare Street, and the collections were expanded to include representative specimens from British expeditions and surveys, various marine stations, and British and European biological suppliers and taxidermists. The new Irish museum was deemed to be on a par with other British institutions, seeing surplus collections and exchanges between the institutions. Specimens of note that were presented to the museum in 1877 included a Giant Irish deer from the Marquess of Bath, and what became recognised as the type specimen of Rhomaleosaurus cramptoni. Carte died in 1881, and was succeeded by Alexander Goodman More, who was given the amended title of curator rather than director.

Under More's direction, the museum focused on the overhauling of the collections and exhibitions, through cleaning, re-labelling, and reorganisation. In particular the displays were set out in a new taxonomy-based order. More retired in 1887 due to ill-health, which resulted in Robert Francis Scharff becoming the new curator in March 1887. In 1890, the purpose-built museum for Irish Antiquities was made ready, which saw the collections of Art and Industry, as well as the herbarium, and the "economic collections" moved into this building. Owing to the museum's reorganisation, the title of "curator" was changed to "keeper". The 1890s saw the first female members of staff with Matilda Knowles and Jane Stephens appointed as technical assistants. A bronze statue of Surgeon-Major Thomas Heazle Parke was commissioned in the 1890s; it still stands at the front of the building.

Electric lighting was introduced to museum buildings in 1882, but it was only in 1895 that it was deemed sufficiently satisfactory that it was possible to fully replace the gas lighting. During this time many of the staff members added to the collections; this included such as Valentine Ball, Richard J. Ussher, and Alfred Cort Haddon. Specimens were also purchased from suppliers such as Robert Damon, Edward Gerrard & Sons, Deyrolle, Václav Frič, Wilhelm Schlüter, Rowland Ward and Williams & Son, Dublin. From 1905 to 1911, Scharff and other members of staff took part in surveys with the RIA of islands off the coast of Ireland such as Lambay and Clare Islands. The staff were also involved in cave explorations, the materials from which were deposited in the museum.

From 1885 to 1920, the museum produced catalogues of its collections by taxa as well as more general guides to the collections across the various divisions. More specialised lists were also written by museum staff. Scharff oversaw further expansion of the collections, particularly for areas of fauna that had been previously poorly represented, with the aim that the collections would reflect the full diversity of fauna in Ireland in particular. In 1909 a new entrance was constructed at the east end of the building facing Merrion Street, partly due to the construction of the College of Science building, which now houses the Department of the Taoiseach. This reversed the direction from which visitors approached the exhibitions and explains why some of the large exhibits still face what appears today to be the back of the building.

=== 1920–2010 ===
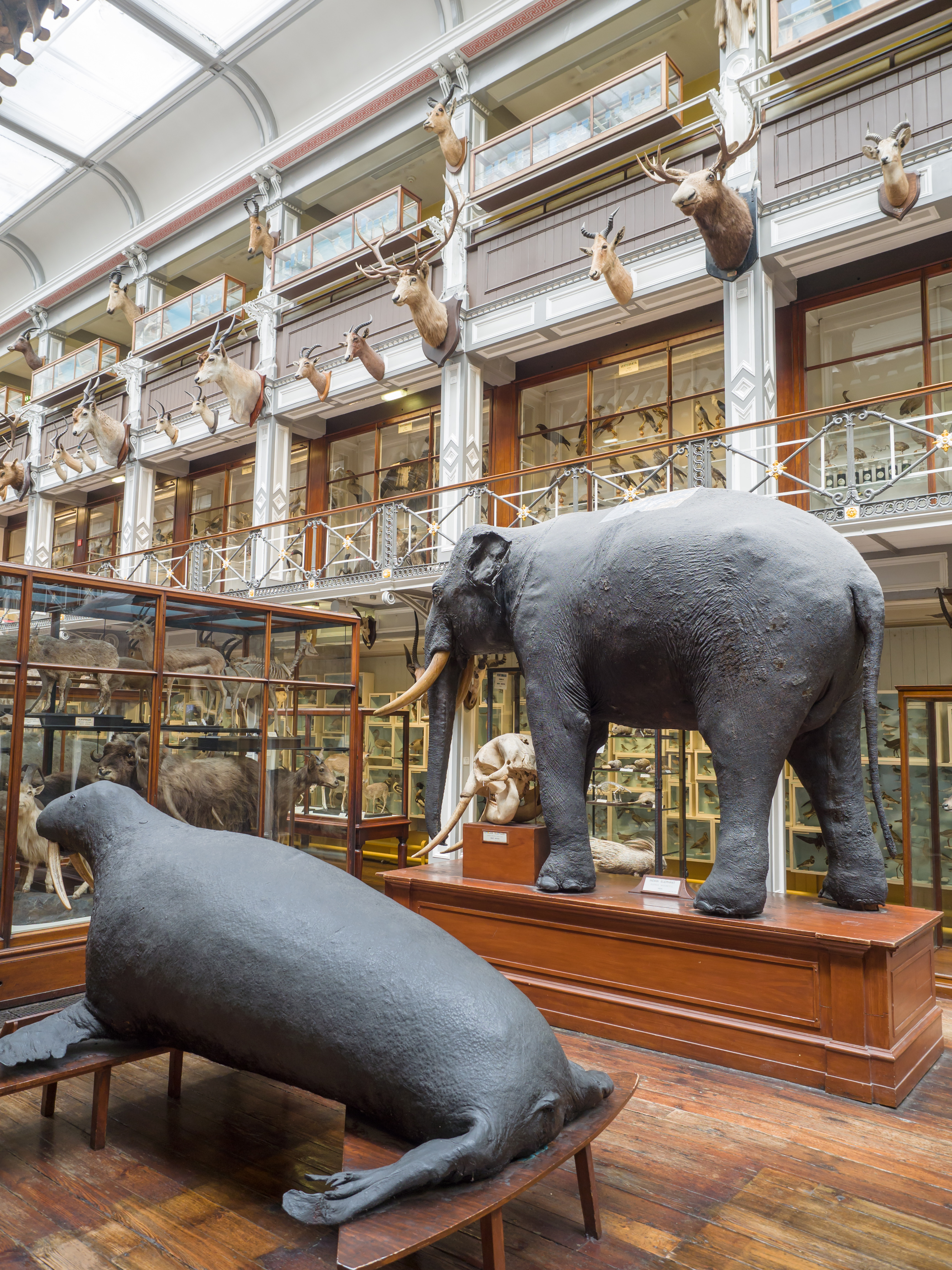
First floor, showing balconies above with display of game heads

In 1920 the RDS vacated Leinster House for their new premises in Ballsbridge, allowing Leinster House to become to seat of the new Irish Free State government. The colonnade which connected the museum to Leinster House was closed off in 1922. During this period the museum itself closed to the public from 28 June 1922, owing to the loss of Leinster House and the consequential reorganisation, but also due to the changeover of staff from the British civil service to the newly formed Irish service.

From 1921 the overall museum structure officially became known as the National Museum of Ireland. The Natural History Museum was reopened on 2 June 1924, with a significantly reduced staff. This also resulted in there being little change to the exhibitions for a long period of time. In 1927 the Minister for Education set up a Committee of Enquiry to report on purpose of the National Museum and how it could be improved. The report was written by Professor Nils Lithberg, in which he noted the cramped and poor conditions in which the zoological collections were held, and that the Natural History Museum was in a precarious condition.

During a period in the 1950s, owing to loss of staff to retirement and resignation, the museum had just one staff member, Geraldine Roche.

The geology and palaeontology collections received more curatorial attention and the addition of numerous new specimens during the later 1950s and 60s under the auspices of John S. Jackson, although the demolition of the Annexe in 1962 impacted access to the geological materials, as they were placed into storage. In the 1960s and 1970s, as staffing levels again increased modestly, the entomology and zoology collections received more attention, both for the exhibitions and the stored collections. An inventory and labelling project was conducted in the 2000s also.

==== Stairway collapse ====
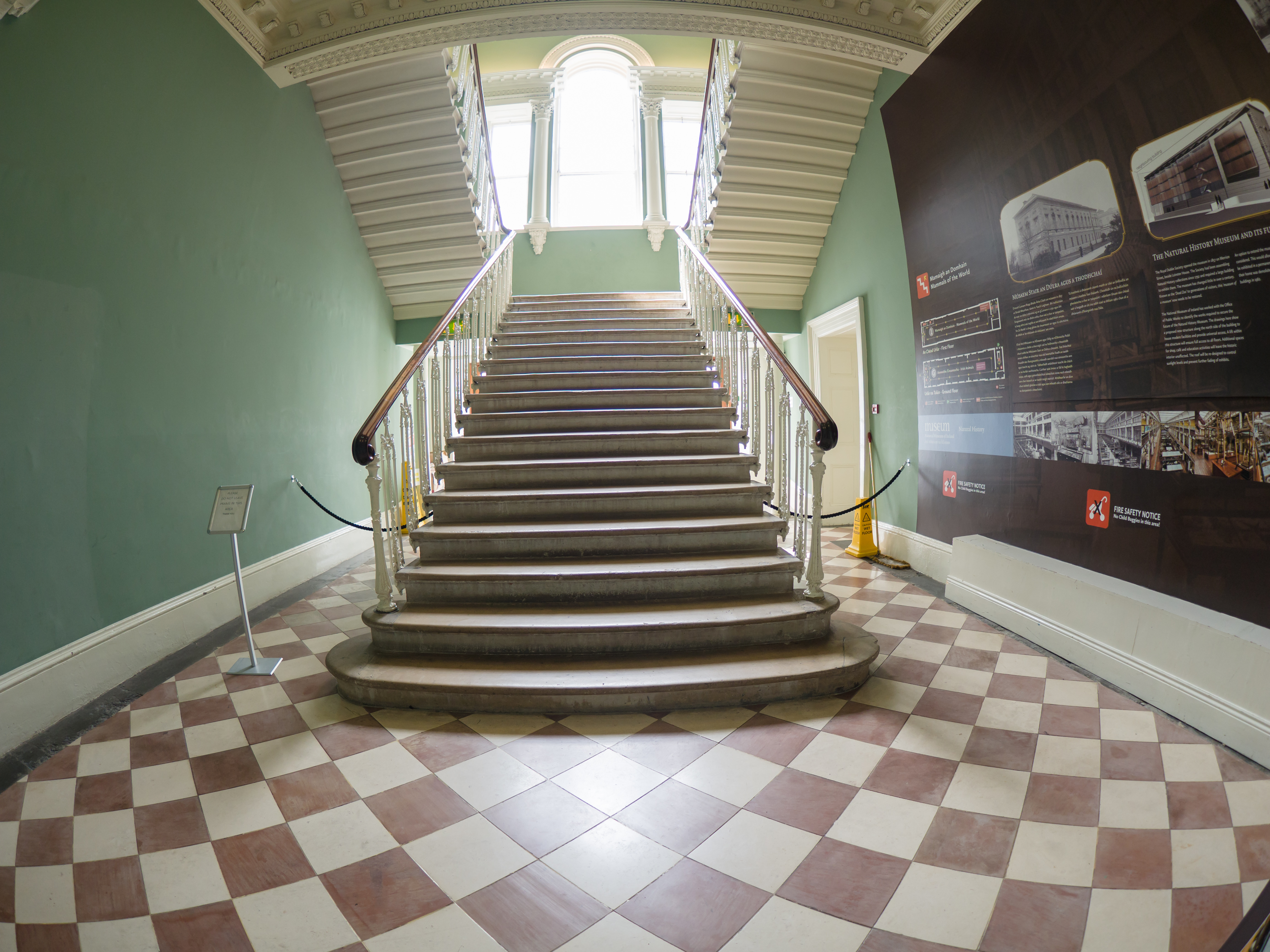
The staircase after refurbishment and reopening in 2010

On the morning of 5 July 2007, the 150-year-old Portland stone staircase (not accessible by the general public) partially collapsed. Eleven people were injured, as a teacher training course was underway in the area. The stairway was a very ornate structure, arising from Leinster House's former status as the home of the Royal Dublin Society. Members of the society would have used what is now the back door of the museum building to gain access from Leinster House to this building, which is why it was built to impress.

The building was subsequently the subject of a Health and Safety review, and following this, plans for improvements were made. The museum was fully closed for nearly three years, until Thursday 29 April 2010, when the ground and first floor were reopened. As of 2021, both of the gallery floors remain closed, due to lack of emergency exits at upper levels.

==== Plans: 2000s ====
In the 2000s plans for an extension to one side of the existing building were considered, to provide more display space, and enable construction of lifts, costed at a total of 15 million euro. Other previous reports have also cited the under-staffing of the museum, along with the restraints of the 19th-century building, as hampering the development of the exhibitions and collections. An even more ambitious plan, for a new building within the Collins Barracks complex to house a number of exhibition spaces including an "earth science gallery", were considered, and even costed, at a total of about 70 million euro. All plans were put aside after the economic collapse of 2008.

=== 2010–present ===
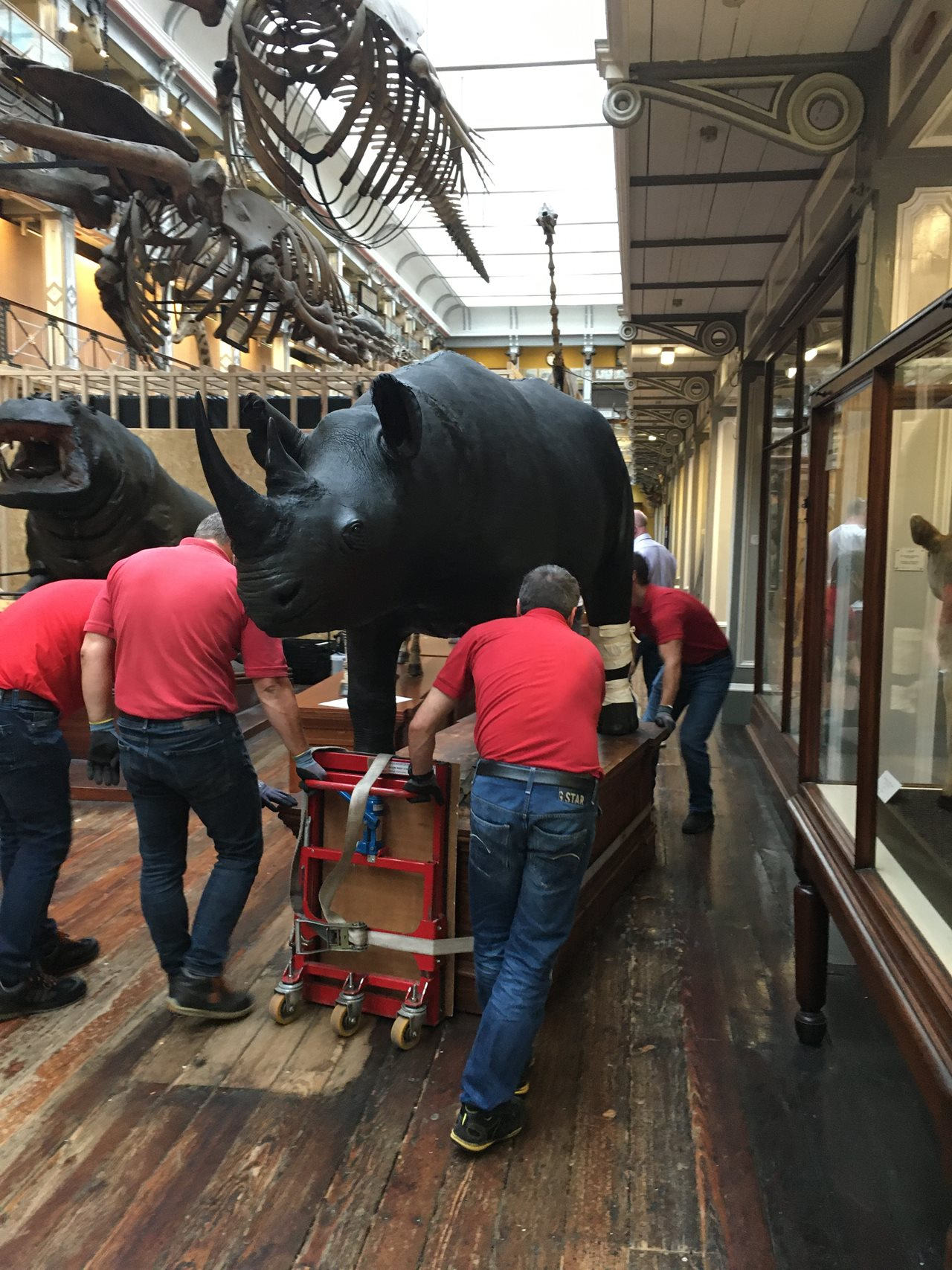
A rhino being moved in preparation for refurbishment works

The museum was included in the National Development Plan 2018-2027, as announced in 2018, with allocation for the construction of a side extension, designed not to interfere with the integrity of the historic building, including display space, as well as an education space, a café, a shop, lifts and other disabled-access facilitation. There was also to be extra emergency exits from the upper floors of the museum.

==== Closure and renovation ====
By 2020, the Office of Public Works was preparing to begin works to restore the roof, and it was hoped that this would be followed by the broader restoration works (now under Project Ireland 2040). In later 2020, work began on removing collections, including the two whale skeletons suspended from the ceiling, to facilitate renovation work on the museum roof and structure. In 2024 it was announced another round of renovation in the building will take places with it taking years to complete.

== Governance and operations ==
The National Museum of Ireland has a unified organisation structure and budget, with a single overall Director, a Keeper for each major collection, including Natural History, and to some extent also location, and shared registration, education, IT and administrative functions. Also shared is the facilities function, which provides the attendants for the galleries.

Staffing has been severely restricted for many years, and at the Natural History Museum these limitations led the period during which there was only one professional zoology staff member, and in the 2000s to there being no educational operation for at least two years, and to the closure of the museum shop for some years; the small shop resumed operations, selling books and other science-related items, at the end of March 2018.

=== Professional functions ===
Including the Keeper, there is a professional staff of just 3–5 in recent years, much smaller than in many comparable institutions, handling management, curation, classification, international cooperation and scientific advice. In particular, the museum forms part of the global scientific community handling taxonomic queries and exchanging materials and reference data. Working with the Keeper are two Curators of Zoology, a Curator of Entomology and Curator of Geology.

==== Keepers ====
The heads of the museum have included Alexander Carte (as Director, 1851-1881), Alexander G. More (as Curator, 1881-1887), Robert F. Scharff (as Keeper, 1891-1921), John S Jackson (1957-1968), Colm E. O'Riordan (1968-1988), James P. O'Connor (1998-2000) and Nigel Monaghan (2001-2022), with Paolo Viscardi serving as of 2022.

== Popular culture ==
In 2020, the children's author and illustrator Peter Donnelly released the book The Dead Zoo, based on the building and its collections. One of a series of books written by school students, In Pieces, also uses the museum as a setting as does the children's novel Molly Malone & Bram Stoker in Double Trouble at the Dead Zoo.

The museum has been used as a filming location, particularly for Victorian period dramas. These include an episode of Ripper Street, from season 2, in 2013. In 2015 Penny Dreadful filmed in the museum for season 3, with the museum standing in for the Natural History Museum, London.

== Other uses ==
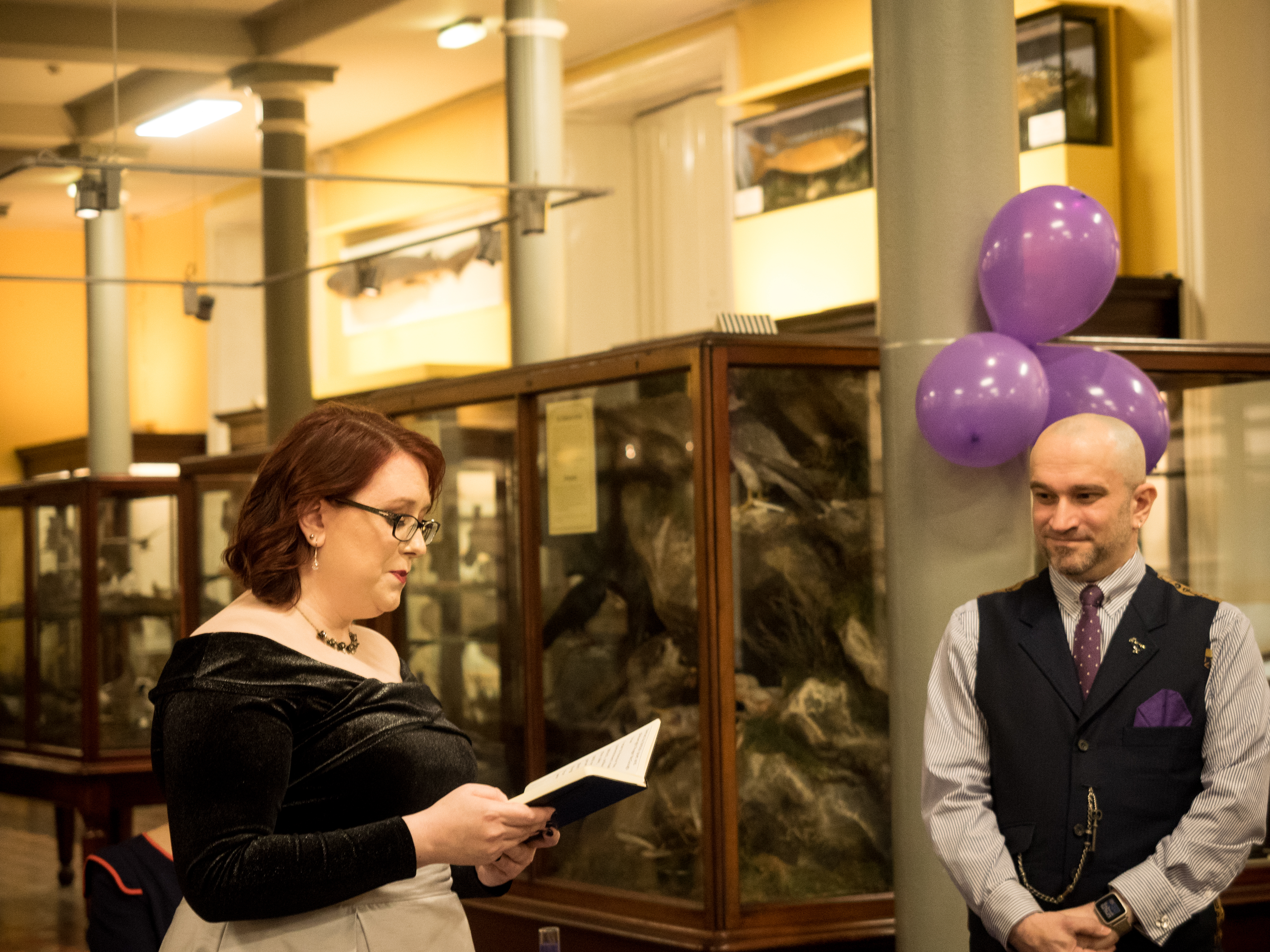
The first wedding ceremony to take place in the Natural History Museum Dublin

In 2018, the museum also became a wedding venue; the first wedding, between former staff member Rebecca O'Neill and her fiancé Greg Sheaf, took place that year.

== See also ==
- Dublin Zoo
