= The Natural History of Ireland =

History book by William Thompson

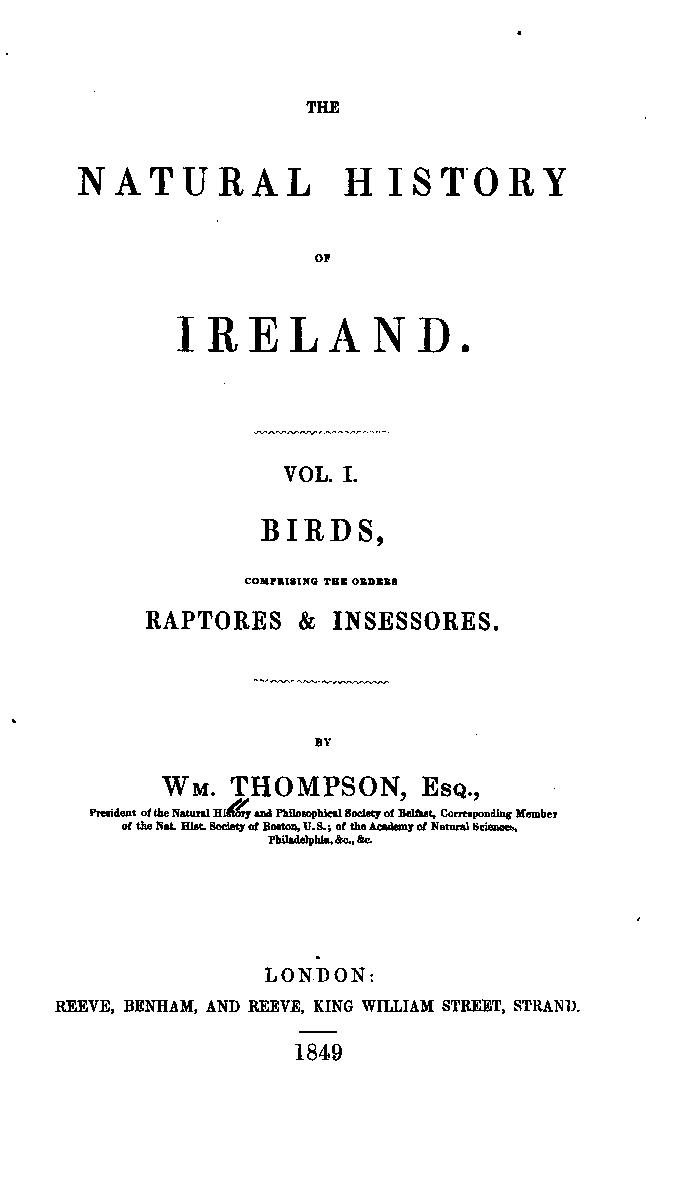
The Natural History of Ireland Volume 1 Frontis

The Natural History of Ireland is a four volume work by William Thompson. The first three volumes were published by Reeve and Benham, London between 1849 and 1851. Volume 4 was published by Henry G. Bohn, London in 1856. The Natural History of Ireland is very influential of later developments.

The parts are:

- Volume 1: Birds, comprising the orders raptores and insessores (1849)
- Volume 2: Birds, comprising the orders rasores and grallatores (1850)
- Volume 3: Birds, comprising the order natatores (1851)
- Volume 4: Mammalia, reptiles and fishes. Also, invertebrata (1856)
  edited and published by George Dickie, James Ramsey Garrett and Robert Patterson four years after Thompson's death.

The Natural History of Ireland was the first attempt to produce an account of the fauna of Ireland. "With so much already done pictorially and descriptively, on the subject of British ornithology, it may be considered superfluous to treat of the birds of Ireland in a separate work, but, in the author's opinion, every country should possess a Natural History specially appertaining to itself. In the publications referred to, the birds of Ireland have been but briefly indicated, — a species generally dis- missed in a single line, and so much appearing only in two works; — those of Sir Win. Jardine and Mr. Yarrell".

== Precursors and sources ==
In 1837 Robert Templeton published a scientific paper entitled "Irish Vertebrate Animals", selected from the Papers of the late John Templeton in the Magazine of Natural History s:Irish Vertebrate Animals: selected from the Papers of John Templeton. This is the first scientific Irish list of Ireland's bird, mammal and fish.

Text on the bird species, Thompson’s main interest, is a mixture of his own observations (some of which he had previously published in Annals and Magazine of Natural History), and as quotations, those of British authors and his many correspondents in Ireland. William Sinclaire, a merchant in Belfast and a bird collector, John Vandeleur Stewart and Richard Langtry an estate owner at Milltown near Belfast figure prominently. Reference is also made to specimens held by the Belfast Museum, Dublin University Museum and the Royal Dublin Society Museum. There is frequent mention of bird preservers.

== Classification ==
The birds are placed in the higher groups proposed by Pierre Barrère and adopted by early 19th century authors.

- Raptores - birds of the orders Falconiformes and Strigiformes.
- Insessores - obsolete term used for a bird with feet adapted for perching.
- Rasores - obsolete term for an order of birds; corresponds to Gallinæ.
- Grallatores, sometimes Grallæ - obsolete term order of birds which formerly included all the waders.
- Natatores - The swimming birds (a very artificial group including ducks, geese and swans).

== Illustrations ==
The work is not illustrated "Figures of Irish birds are not required, as all the species are included, down to the period of publication (to mention British works only) in Selby's Illustrations of British Ornithology, Gould's Birds of Europe Volume 1, Volume 2, Volume 3, Volume 4, Volume 5; and the History of British Birds by Bewick Bewick volume 1, Bewick volume 2 and Yarrell [1843], respectively.Yarrell Volume 1, Volume 2, Volume 3 Coloured figures of many of the species are also given in Sir Wm. Jardine's work on British Birds and in Mr. Macgillivray's , the heads, at least, of nearly all the land birds are represented".

== Style ==
The style is literary. Note that the quote is verbatim, the verification complete and the museum location given and that Temminck's French text has been translated and that Thompson knows that this is the first British Isles record. From page 364:

THE GREAT SPOTTED CUCKOO.

Cuculus glandarius, Linn.

Has once been obtained.

A letter from A. Crighton, Esq., of Clifden, Connemara, to Mr. R, Ball gives the following information respecting it:—-
"The cuckoo, pursued by hawks, was taken by two persons, walking on the island of Omagh. It flew into a hole in a stone fence or wall, was caught alive, and lived for four days on potatoes and water. The inhabitants of this country had never seen any bird like it before, and as they are constantly in the habit of fishing at Bofin and Arran Islands, if the bird were to be met with, no doubt they would have recognised it. The bird when chased by the hawks, appeared fatigued, weak, and emaciated, as though it had taken a long flight, as woodcocks and other birds of passage do on first arrival." The month of March, 1842 is said to have been the time of its capture. On being sent to Dublin to be preserved, an excellent coloured drawing of it, the size of life, was kindly made by Miss Battersby, and forwarded for my acceptance: the plumage represented agrees best with that of the adult bird, as described by Temminck. The specimen has subsequently been obtained by Mr. Ball for the museum of Trinity College Dublin. It is the only one known to have visited the British Islands.
According to Temminck (part 3, p. 277) the northern parts of Africa seem to be the chief abode of this bird, which occasionally visits southern Europe—Spain, France (south of), Italy, &c. In Germany also, it has been met with in different instances.
"Mr Gould, in his well known work on the Birds of Europe, says, that the true habitat of this species is the wooded districts, skirting the sultry plains of North Africa, but those that pass the Mediterranean, find a congenial climate in Spain and Italy. Opportunities are still wanting to confirm the most interesting of its habits." *

* Yarrell, British Birds, vol. ii. p. 202. (2nd edit.)

== Volume 4 ==
Invertebrata In this section the editors of Volume 4 (Dickie, Garrett and Patterson) were assisted by two of its contributors Robert Ball in Dublin and George Crawford Hyndman in Belfast who had supplied Thompson with information on Invertebrates . Alexander Henry Haliday wrote a short section on insects which was limited to the number of Irish species in each Order.William Henry Harvey, George James Allman and Joshua Alder are prominent in the text. Invertebrata is part based on Robert Templeton's 1836 text A catalogue of the species annulose animals and of rayed ones found in Ireland as selected from the papers of the late J. Templeton Esq. of Cranmore with localities, descriptions and illustrations. Magazine of Natural History 9: 233-240; 301-305; 41-421; 466-472.There are two lady contributors - Miss Hancock (sister of Albany Hancock) and Mary Ball.

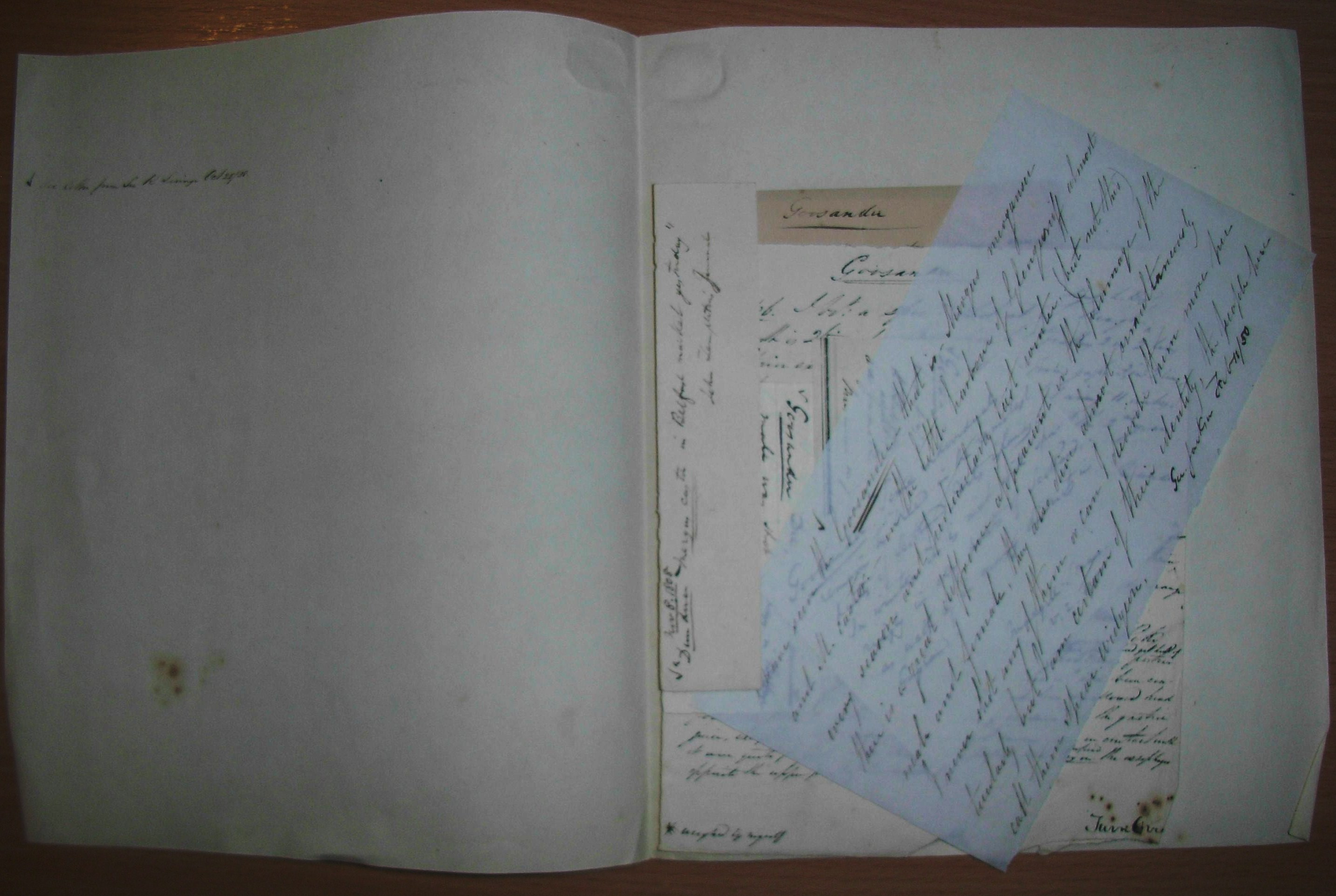
Envelope (folder) with letter extracts and notes on the goosander

== Method ==
Thompson kept his notes for The Natural History of Ireland in envelopes. These contained notes made at various times, letters, or extracts from letters, references to his personal journals or to his published papers, to books, to scientific periodicals, or to the transactions of societies (many foreign). Small envelopes contained notes on species. These were placed in larger envelopes for genera (also containing notes on genera). In turn these were placed in envelopes for families (containing notes on families). The families, genera, and species were arranged in regular sequence so that any particular one could immediately be found. The notes were written on paper "of the most miscellaneous description; and occasionally on scraps so small that six or eight lines were crowded into a slip not exceeding an inch in breadth".
