= John Templeton (botanist) =

Irish naturalist and botanist

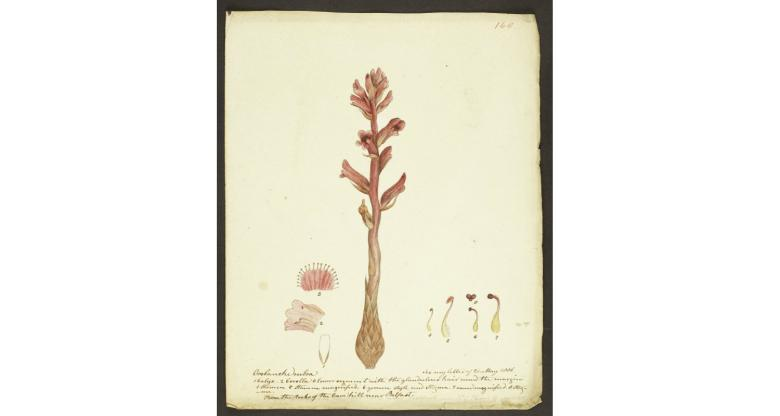
Watercolour of Orobanche rubra by John Templeton

John Templeton (1766–1825) was a pioneering Irish naturalist, sometimes referred to as the "Father of Irish Botany". He was a leading figure in Belfast's late eighteenth-century enlightenment, initially supported the United Irishmen, and figured prominently in the town's scientific and literary societies.

== Family ==
Templeton was born in Belfast in 1766, the son of James Templeton, a prosperous wholesale merchant, and his wife Mary Eleanor, daughter of Benjamin Legg, a sugar refiner. The family resided in a 17th-century country house to the south of the town, which had been named Orange Grove in honour of William of Orange who had stopped at the house en route to his victory over James II at the Battle of the Boyne in 1690.

Until the age of 16 Templeton attended a progressive, co-educational, school favoured by the town's liberal, largely Presbyterian, merchant class. Schoolmaster David Manson sought to exclude "drudgery and fear" by combining classroom instruction with play and experiential learning. Templeton counted among his schoolfellow's brother and sister Henry Joy and Mary Ann McCracken, and maintained a warm friendship with them throughout his life.

In 1799, Templeton married Katherine Johnson of Seymour Hill. Her family had been touched by the United Irish rebellion the previous year: her brother-in-law, Henry Munro, commander of the United army at the Battle of Ballynahinch, had been hanged. The couple had five children: Ellen, born on 30 September 1800, Robert, born on 12 December 1802, Catherine, born on 19 July 1806, Mary, born on 9 December 1809 and Matilda on 2 November 1813.

The union between the two already prosperous merchant families provided more than ample means enabling Templeton to devote himself passionately to the study of natural history.

== United Irishman ==
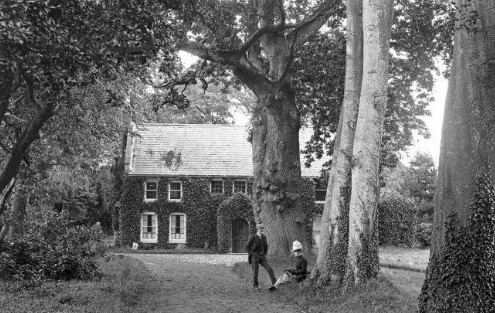
Cranmore House 1886

Like many of his liberal Presbyterian peers in Belfast, Templeton was sympathetic to the programme and aims of the Society of United Irishmen: Catholic Emancipation and democratic reform of the Irish Parliament. But it was several years before he was persuaded to take the United Irish "test" or pledge. In March 1797 his friend, Mary Ann McCracken, wrote to her brother:

[A] certain Botanical friend of ours whose steady and inflexible mind is invulnerable to any other weapon but reason, and only to be moved by conviction has at last turned his attention from the vegetable kingdom to the human species and after pondering the matter for some months, is at last determined to become what he ought to have been months ago.

She hoped his sisters would "soon follow him." Having committed himself to the patriotic union of Catholics, Protestants and Dissenters, Templeton changed the name of the family home, which had been named Orange Grove in honour of a visit to the house by King William 1690, to Irish "Cranmore" (crann mór, 'big tree').

Templeton was disenchanted by the Rebellion of 1798, and mindful of events in France, was repelled by the violence. He nonetheless withdrew from the Belfast Literary Society, of which he had been a founding member in 1801, rather than accept the continued presence of Dr. James MacDonnell. MacDonnell's offence had been to subscribe forty guineas in 1803 for the capture (leading to execution) of the unreformed rebel Thomas Russell who had been their mutual friend. (While unable to "forget the amiable Russell", time, he conceded, "softened a little my feelings": In 1825, Templeton and MacDonnell met and shook hands).

== Garden ==
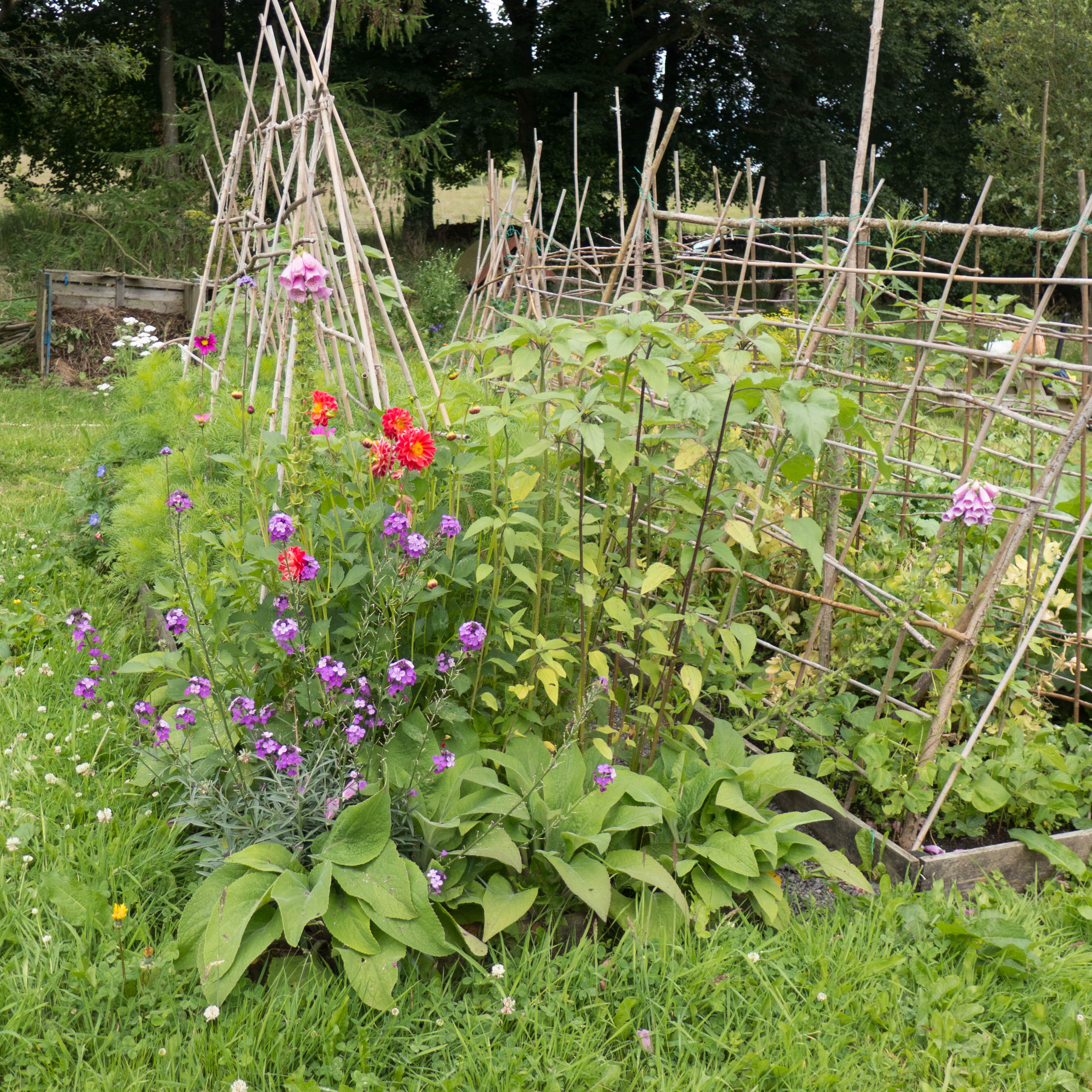
Partial reconstruction of the Cranmore garden

The garden at Cranmore spread over 13-acre garden was planted with exotic and native species acquired on botanical excursions, from fellow botanists, nurseries, botanical gardens and abroad: "Received yesterday a large chest of East Indian plants which I examined today." "Box from Mr. Taylor".Other plants arrived, often as seeds from North America, Australia, India, China and other parts of the British Empire. Cranmore also served as a small animal farm, for experimental animal husbandry and a kitchen garden.

== Botanist ==
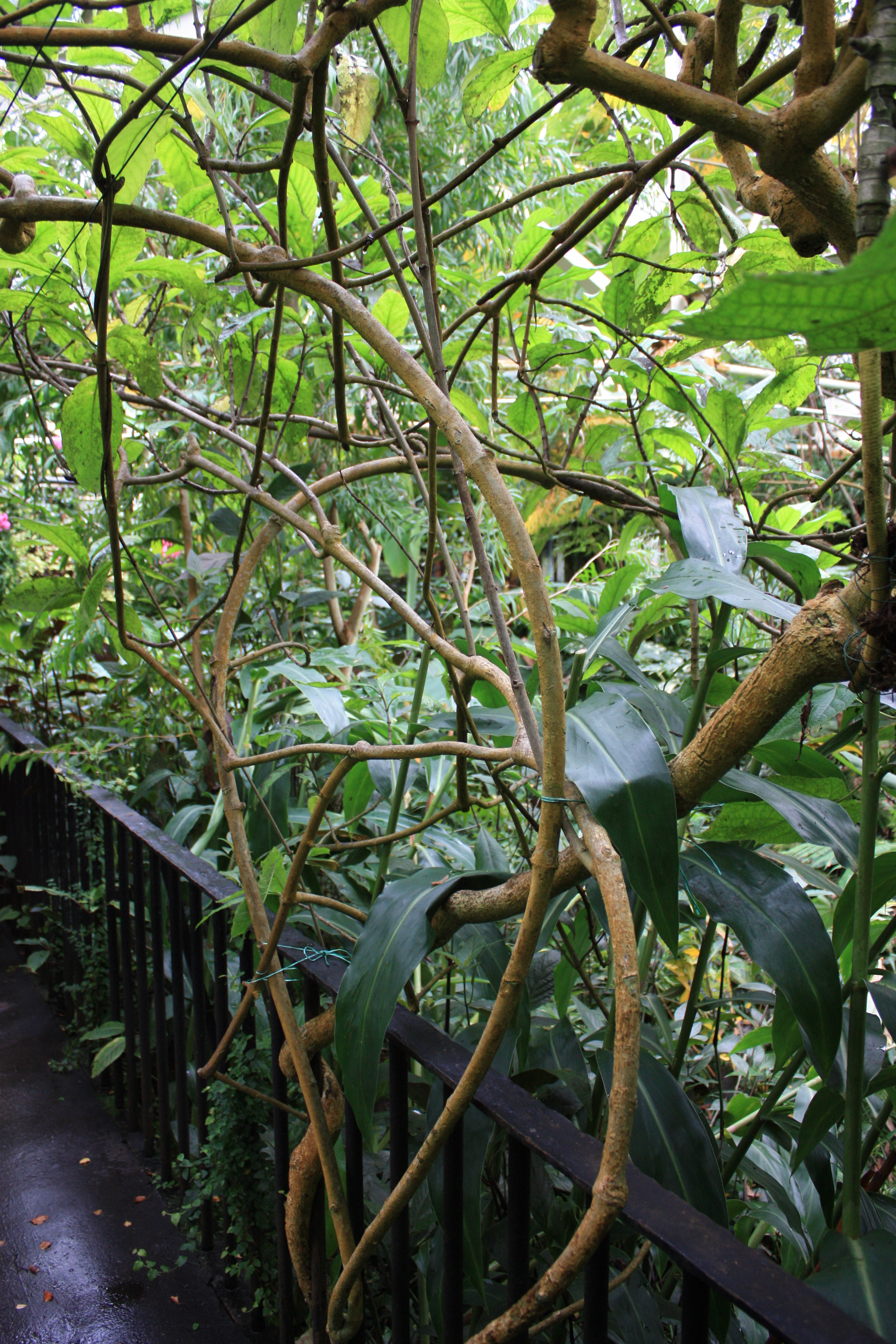
Plants in the tropical house in the Botanic Gardens, Belfast

John Templeton's interest in botany began with this experimental garden laid out according to a suggestion in Rousseau's 'Nouvelle Heloise' and following Rousseau's 'Letters on the Elements of Botany Here he cultivated many tender exotics out of doors (a list provided by Nelson and began botanical studies which lasted throughout his life and corresponded with the most eminent botanists in England Sir William Hooker, William Turner, James Sowerby and, especially Sir Joseph Banks, who had travelled on Captain James Cook's voyages, and in charge of Kew Gardens. Banks tried (unsuccessfully) to tempt him to New Holland (Australia) as a botanist on the Flinders's Expedition with the offer of a large tract of land and a substantial salary. An associate of the Linnean Society, Templeton visited London and saw the botanical work being achieved there. This led to his promotion of the Belfast Botanic Gardens as early as 1809, and to work on a Catalogue of Native Irish Plants, in manuscript form and now in the Royal Irish Academy, which was used as an accurate foundation for later work by succeeding Irish botanists. He also assembled text and executed many beautiful watercolour drawings for a Flora Hibernica, sadly never finished, and kept a detailed journal during the years 1806–1825 (both now in the Ulster Museum, Belfast). Of the 12000 algal specimens in the Ulster Museum Herbarium about 148 are in the Templeton collection and were mostly collected by him, some were collected by others and passed to Templeton. The specimens in the Templeton collection in the Ulster Museum (BEL) have been catalogued. Those noted in 1967 were numbered: F1 – F48. Others were in The Queen's University Belfast. All of Templeton's specimens have now been numbered in the Ulster Museum as follows: F190 – F264; F290 – F314 and F333 – F334.

Templeton was the first finder of Rosa hibernicaThis rose, although collected by Templeton in 1795, remained undescribed until 1803 when he published a short diagnosis in the Transactions of the Dublin Society. Early additions to the flora of Ireland include Sisymbrium Ligusticum seoticum (1793), Adoxa moschatellina (1820), Orobanche rubra and many other plants. His work on lichens was the basis of this section of Flora Hiberica by James Townsend Mackay who wrote of him The foregoing account of the Lichens of Ireland would have been still more incomplete, but for the extensive collection of my lamented friend, the late Mr. John Templeton, of Cranmore, near Belfast, which his relict, Mrs. Templeton, most liberally placed at my disposal. I believe that thirty years ago his acquirements in the Natural History of organised beings rivalled that of any individual in Europe : these were by no means limited to diagnostic marks, but extended to all the laws and modifications of the living force. The frequent quotation of his authority in every preceding department of this Flora, is but a brief testimony of his diversified knowledge

== Botanical manuscripts ==
The MSS. left by Templeton consist of seven volumes. One of these is a small 8vo. half bound; it is in the Library of the Royal Irish Academy, and contains 280 pp. of lists of Cryptogams, chiefly mosses, with their localities. In this book is inserted a letter from Miss F. M. More, sister of Alexander Goodman More, to Dr. Edward Perceval Wright, Secretary, Royal Irish Academy, dated March 1897, in which she says "The Manuscript which accompanies this letter was drawn up between 1794 and 1810, by the eminent naturalist, John Templeton, in Belfast. It was lent by his son, Dr. R. Templeton, to my brother, Alex. G. More, when he was preparing the second edition of the 'Cybele Hibernica,' on condition that it should be placed in the Library of the Royal Irish Academy afterwards."

The other six volumes are quarto size, and contain 1,090 folios, with descriptions of many of the plants, and careful drawings in pen and pencil and colours of many species. They are now lent to the Belfast Museum. About ten years ago I [Lett]spent a week in examining these volumes, and as their contents have hitherto never been fully described, I would like to give an epitome of my investigation of them.

- Vol. 1.—Phanerogams, 186 folios, with 15 coloured figures, and 6 small drawings in the text.
- Vol. Il.—Fresh-water Algae, 246 folios, 71 of which are coloured.
- Vol.IIl.—Marine Algae, 212 folios, of which 79 are coloured figures. At the end of this volume are 3 folios of Mosses, the pagination of which runs with the rest of this volume, but it is evident they had at some time been misplaced.
- Vol. IV Fungi, 112 folios.
- Vol. V.—Mosses, 117 folios, of which 20 are coloured, and also 73 small drawings in the text. *Vol. VI.—Mosses and Hepatics. 117 folios are Hepatics, 40 of which are in colours; 96 folios are Mosses, of which 39 are full-page coloured figures; and in addition, there are 3 small coloured drawings in the text.

All these drawings were executed by Templeton himself, they are every one most accurately and beautifully drawn; and the colouring is true to nature and artistically finished; those of the mosses and hepatics being particularly good. Templeton is not mentioned in Tate’s ‘‘ Flora Belfastiensis,’ published in 1863, at Belfast. The earliest published reference to his MSS. is in the "* Flora of Ulster," by Dickie, published in 1864, where there is this indefinite allusion—‘* To the friends of the late Mr. Templeton I am indebted for permission to take notes of species recorded in his manuscript." The MS. was most likely the small volume now in the Royal Irish Academy Library. In the introduction to the "*‘ Flora of the North-east of Ireland"’ (1888), there is a brief biographical sketch of Templeton, but no mention of any MS. However, in a ‘‘ Supplement" to the Flora (1894), there is this note— ‘* Templeton, John, four volumes of his ‘ Flora Hibernica’ at present deposited with the Belfast Natural History and Philosophical Society, contain much original matter, which could not be worked out in time for the present paper." This fixes the approximate date of the MSS. being loaned to the Belfast Museum. They were not known to the authors of the ‘‘ Cybele Hibernica’"’ in 1866, while in the second edition (1898) the small volume of the MSS. in R.1.A. Library is described in the Index of Authors under its full title—Catalogue of the Native Plants of Ireland, by John Templeton, A.L.S.

== Notable plant finds ==
Antrim:Northern beech fern Glenaan River, Cushendall 1809: intermediate wintergreen Sixmilewater 1794: heath pearlwort: Muck Island Islandmagee 1804: dwarf willow Slievenanee Mountain 1809: thin-leaf brookweed beside River Lagan in its tidal reaches – gone now 1797: Dovedale moss Cave Hill 1797: Arctic root Slemish Mountain pre 1825: Cornish moneywort formerly cultivated at Cranmore, Malone Road, Belfast1 pre-1825 J. persisted to 1947: rock whitebeam basalt cliffs of the Little Deerpark, Glenarm 15 July 1808: yellow meadow rue Portmore Lough 1800: Moschatel Mountcollyer Deerpark 2 May 1820, Bearberry Fair Head pre 1825, Sea Bindweed Bushfoot dunes pre 1825, Flixweed, 'Among the ruins of Carrickfergus I found Sisymbrium Sophia in plenty' 2 Sept. 1812 – Journal of J. Templeton J4187, Needle Spike-rush Broadwater pre 1825, Dwarf Spurge Lambeg gravel pit 1804, Large-flowered Hemp-nettle, Glenarm pre 1825 Down: Field Gentian Slieve Donard 1796: Lesser Twayblade Newtonards Park pre 1825: Rough poppy 15 July 1797: Six-stamened Waterwort Castlewellan Lake 1808: Great Sundew going to the mountains from Kilkeel 19 August 1808: Hairy Rock-cress Dundrum Castle 1797: Intermediate Wintergree Moneygreer Bog 1797 Cowslip Holywood Warren pre 1825 long gone since: Water-violet Crossgar 7 July 1810 Scots Lovage Bangor Bay 1809, Mountain Everlasting Newtownards 1793, Frogbit boghole near Portaferry, Parsley fern, Slieve Binnian, Mourne Mountains 19 August 1808, Bog-rosemary Wolf Island Bog 1794, Marsh Pea Lough Neagh Fermanagh: Marsh Helleborine

== Natural history of Ireland ==
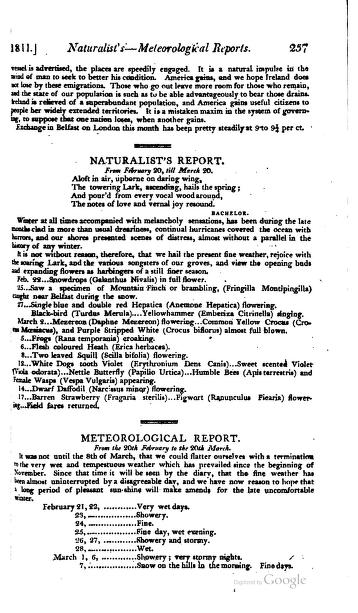
Naturalist's Report in Belfast Monthly Magazine 1811

John Templeton had wide-ranging scientific interests including chemistry as it applied to agriculture and horticulture, meteorology and phenology following Robert Marsham. He published very little aside from monthly reports on natural history and meteorology in the 'Belfast Magazine' commenced in 1808. John Templeton studied birds extensively, collected shells, marine organisms (especially "Zoophytes") and insects, notably garden pest species. He planned a 'Hibernian Fauna' to accompany 'Hibernian Flora'. This was not published, even in part, but A catalogue of the species annulose animals and of rayed ones found in Ireland as selected from the papers of the late J Templeton Esq. of Cranmore with localities, descriptions, and illustrations Mag. Nat. Hist. 9: 233- 240; 301 305; 417–421; 466 -472 , 1836. Catalogue of Irish Crustacea, Myriapoda and Arachnoida, selected from the papers of the late John Templeton Esq. Mag. Nat. Hist. 9: 9–14 .and 1837 Irish Vertebrate animals selected from the papers of the late. John Templeton Esq Mag. Nat. Hist . 1: (n. s.): 403–413 403 -413 were (collated and edited By Robert Templeton). Much of his work was used by later authors, especially by William Thompson whose 'The Natural History of Ireland' is its essential continuation.

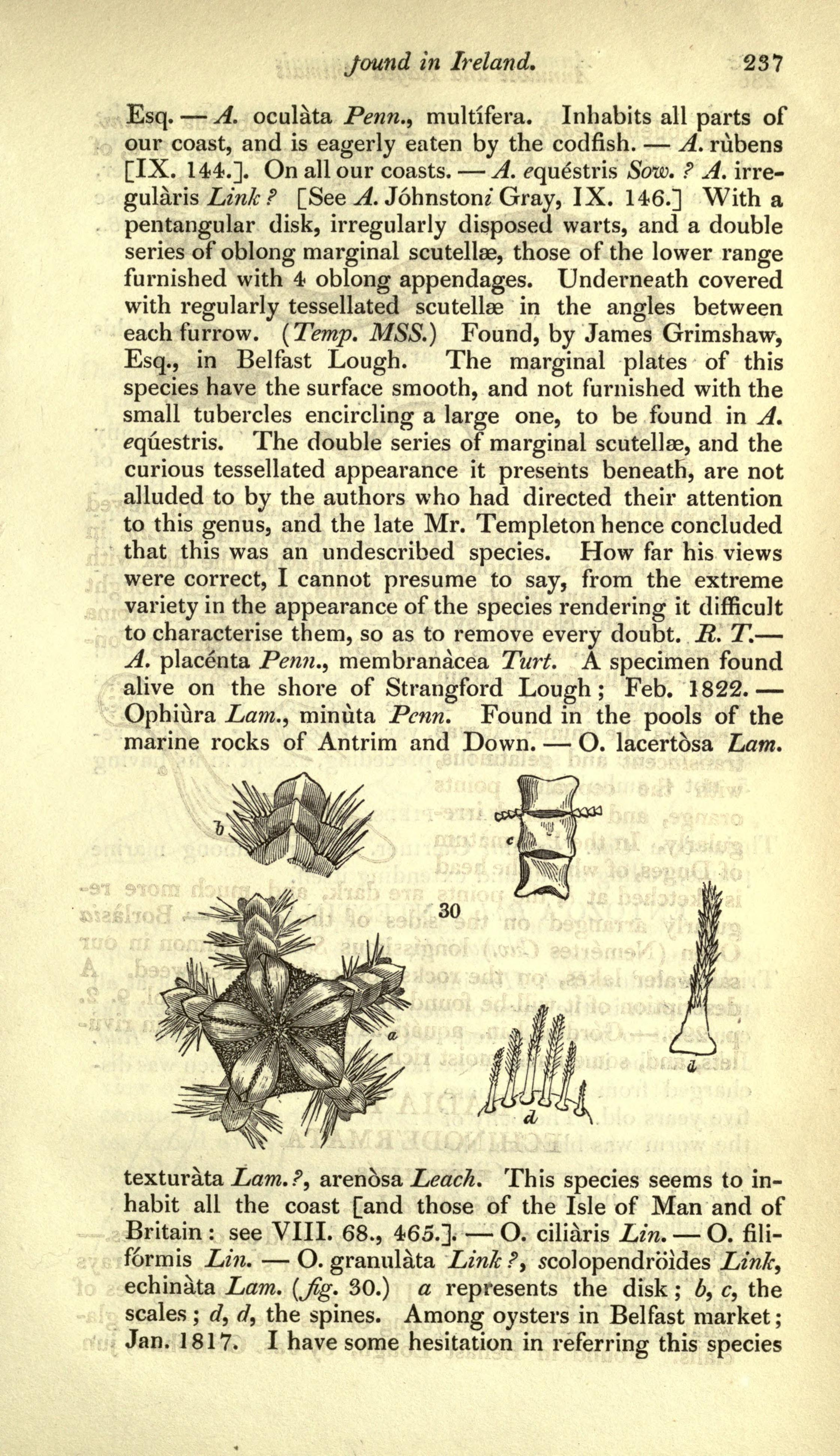
Rayed Animals found in Ireland Page237

== Dublin ==
Templeton was a regular visitor to the elegant Georgian city of Dublin (by 1816 the journey was completed in one day in a Wellington coach with 4 passengers) and he was a Member of the Royal Dublin Society. By his death in 1825 the Society had established a Botanic at Glasnevin "with the following sections: 1 The Linnaean garden, which contains two divisions, - Herbaceous plants, and shrub-fruit; and forest-tree plants. 2. Garden arranged on the system of Jussieu. 3. Garden of Indigenous plants (to Ireland), disposed according to the system of Linnaeus. 4. Kitchen Garden, where six apprentices are constantly employed, who receive a complete knowledge of systematic botany. 5. Medicinal plants. 6. Plants eaten, or rejected, by cattle. 7. Plants used in rural economy. 8. Plants used in dyeing. 9. Rock plants. 10. Aquatic and marsh plants. - For which an artificial marsh has been formed. 11. Cryptogamics. 12. Flower garden, besides extensive hot-houses, and a conservatory for exotics". Other associations were with Leinster House housing the RDS Museum and Library. "Second Room. Here the animal kingdom is displayed, arranged in six classes. 1. Mammalia. 2. Aves. 3. Amphibia. 4. Pisces. 5. Insectae. 6. Vermes. Here is a great variety of shells, butterflies and beetles, and of the most beautiful species" and the Leske collection. The library at Leinster House held 12,000 books and was particularly rich in works on botany; "amongst which is a very valuable work in four large folio volumes, "Gramitia Austriaca" [Austriacorum Icones et descriptions graminum]; by Nicholas Thomas Host".Templeton was also associated with the Farming Society funded in 1800, the Kirwanian Society founded 1812, Marsh's Library, Trinity College Botanic Garden. Four acres supplied with both exotic and indigenous plants, the Trinity Library (80,000 volumes) and Trinity Museum.Also the Museum of the College of Surgeons.

== Death and legacy ==
Never of strong constitution, he was not expected to survive, he was in failing health from 1815 and died in 1825 aged only 60, "leaving a sorrowing wife, youthful family and many friends and townsmen who greatly mourned his death". The Australian leguminous genus Templetonia is named for him.

In 1810 Templeton had supported the veteran United Irishman, William Drennan, in the foundation of the Belfast Academical Institution. With the staff and scholars of the Institution's early Collegiate Department, he then helped form the Belfast Natural History and Philosophical Society (the origin of both the Botanical Gardens and what is now the Ulster Museum).

Although always ready to communicate his own findings, Templeton did not publish much. Robert Lloyd Praeger (1865-1953), editor of the Irish Naturalist and President of the Royal Irish Academy, described him nonetheless as "the most eminent naturalist Ireland has produced".

Templeton's son, Robert Templeton (1802-1892), educated at the Belfast Academical Institution (which was eventually to acquire Cranmore House), became an entomologist renowned for his work on Sri Lankan arthropods. Robert's fellow pupil James Emerson Tennent went on to write Ceylon, Physical, Historical and Topographical

== Contacts ==
- Thomas Martyn From 1794 supplied Martyn with many remarks on cultivation for Martyn's edition of Miller's Gardener's Dictionary.
- George Shaw
- James Edward Smith Contributions to English Botany and Flora Britannica
- James Lee
- Samuel Goodenough
- Aylmer Bourke Lambert
- James Sowerby
- William Curtis
- Joseph Banks
- Robert Brown.
- Lewis Weston Dillwyn's Contributions to British Confervæ (1802–07)
- Dawson Turner Contributions to British Fuci (1802), and Muscologia Hibernica (1804).
- John Walker
- Francis Rawdon-Hastings, 1st Marquess of Hastings
- John Foster, 1st Baron Oriel
- Jonathan Stokes
- Walter Wade

== Other ==
John Templeton maintained a natural history cabinet containing specimens from Calobar, New Holland and The Carolinas as well as is Ireland cabinets. His library included Rees's Cyclopædia and works by Carl Linnaeus, Edward Donovan and William Swainson s:Zoological Illustrations and he used a John Dollond microscope and lenses. He made a tour of Scotland with Henry MacKinnon. His diaries record the Comet of 1807 and the Great Comet of 1811.

== Gallery ==
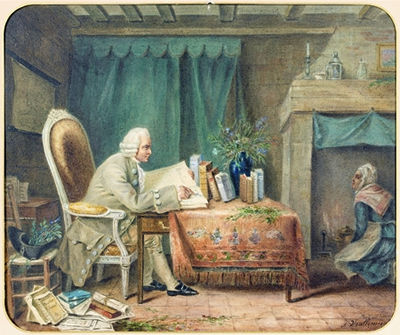
Jean-Jacques Rousseau travaillant à son herbier (herbarium)

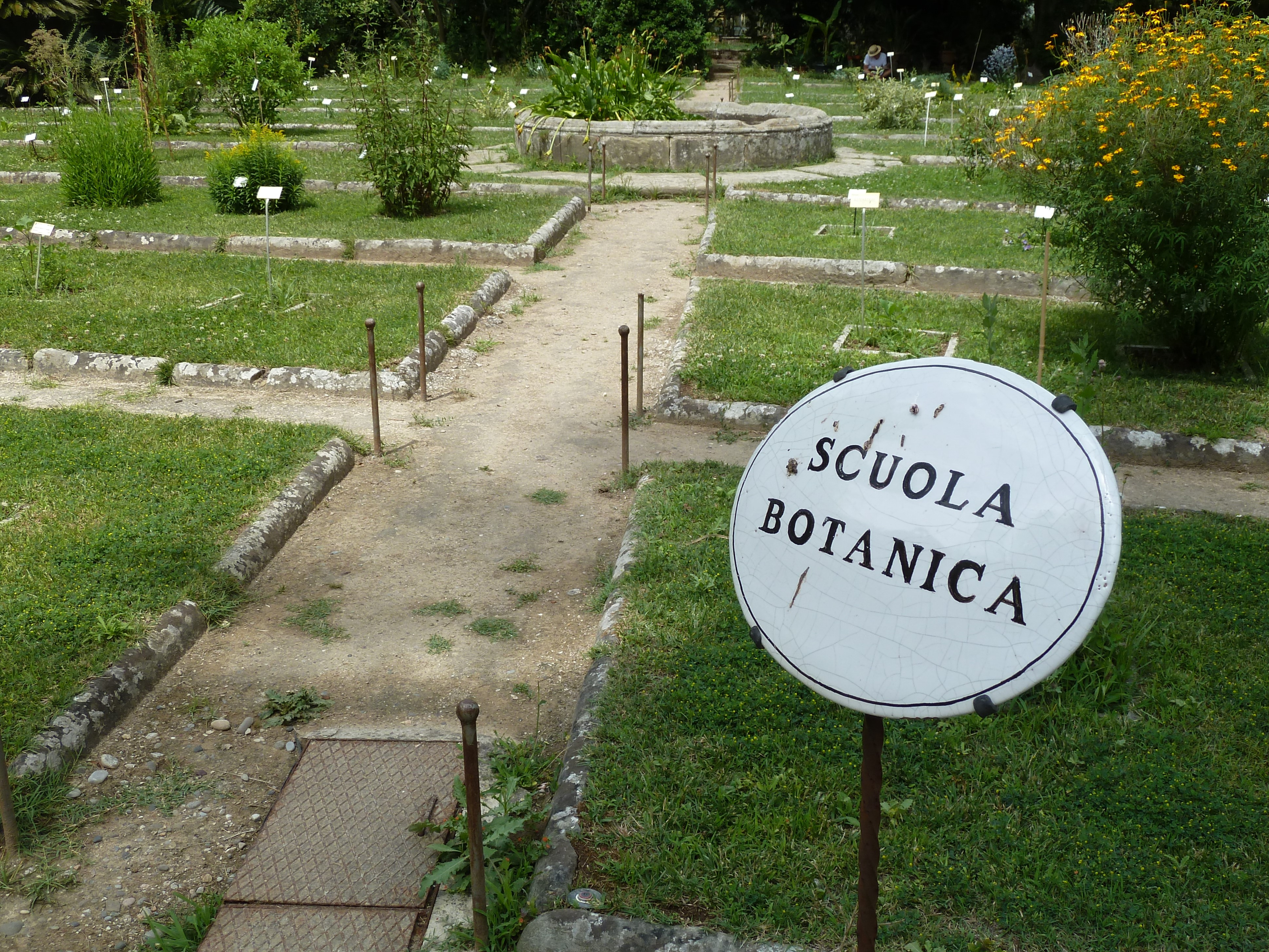
A Linnaean garden in which the plants follow the order in Systema Naturae

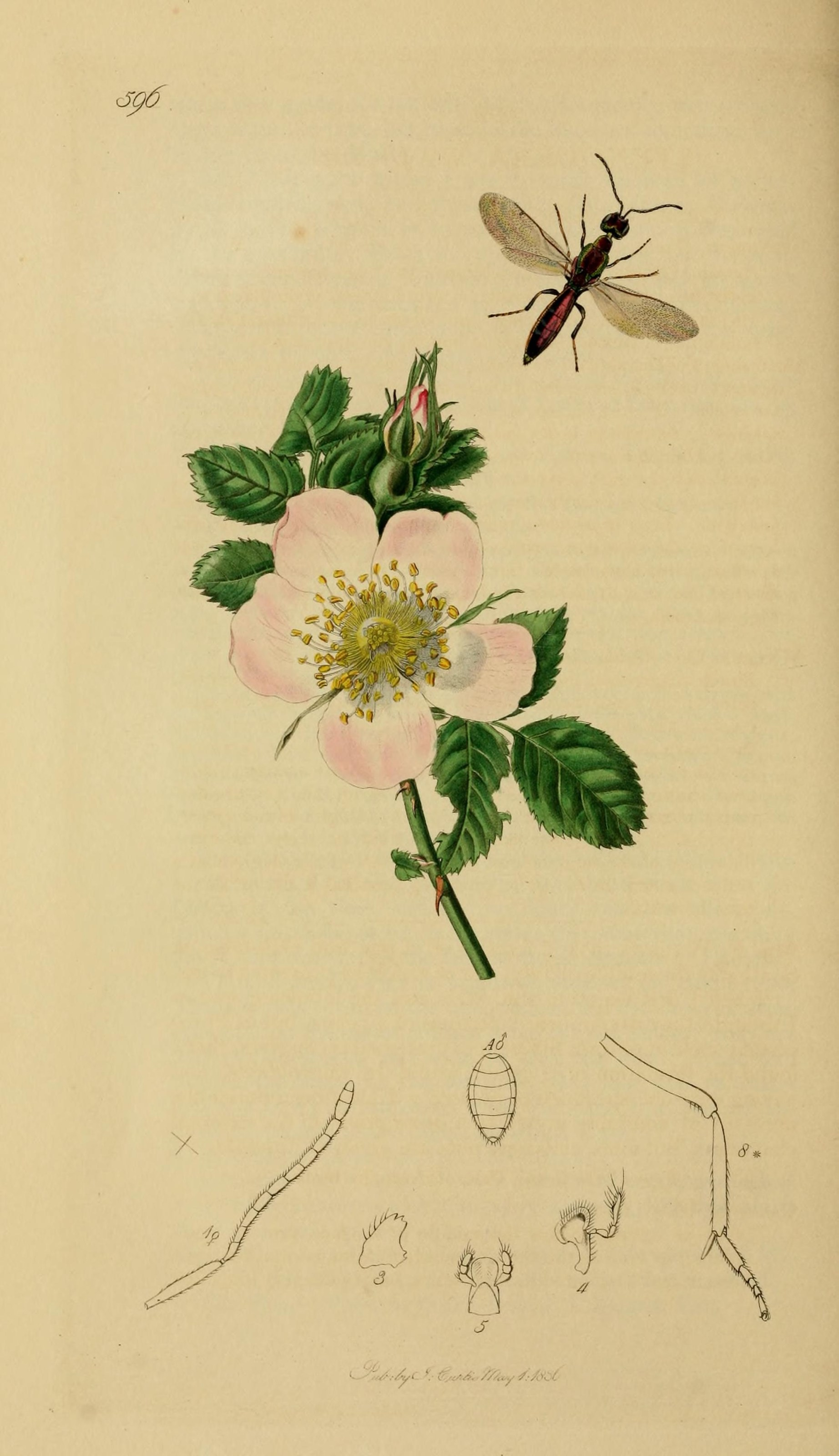
Rosa hibernica depicted in British Entomology (1829) "For the beautiful drawing of 'Rosa Hibernica' (the Belfast Rose) I am indebted to Miss Haliday"

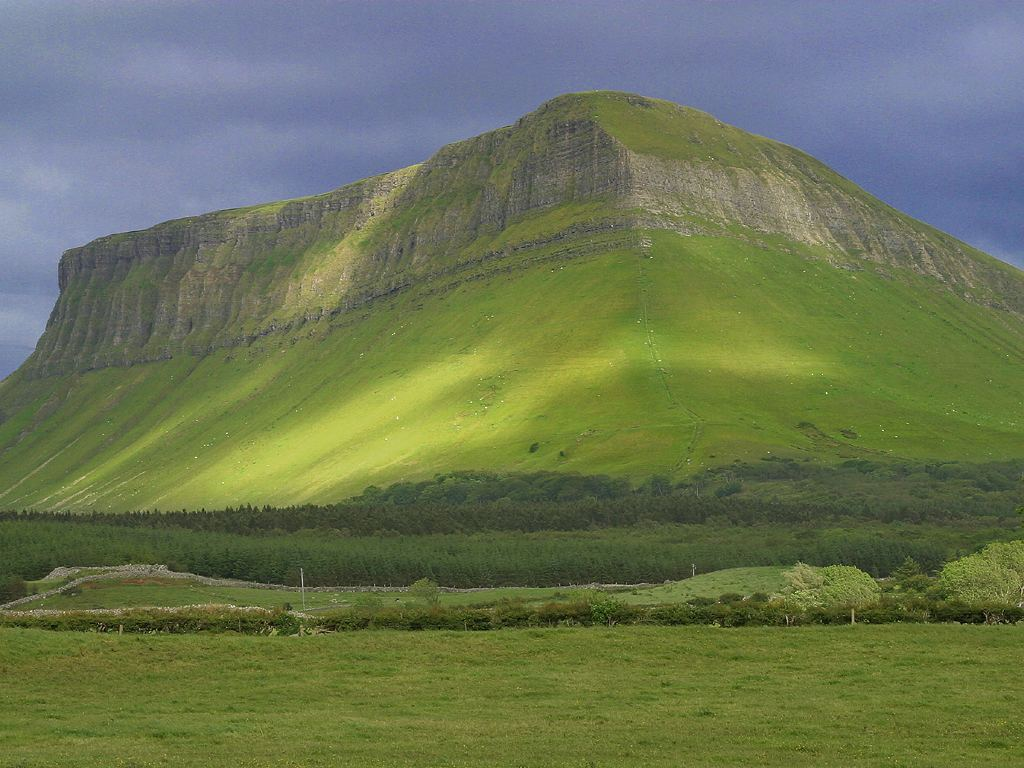
Ben Bulben, Co.Sligo. Templeton collected rare plants here.

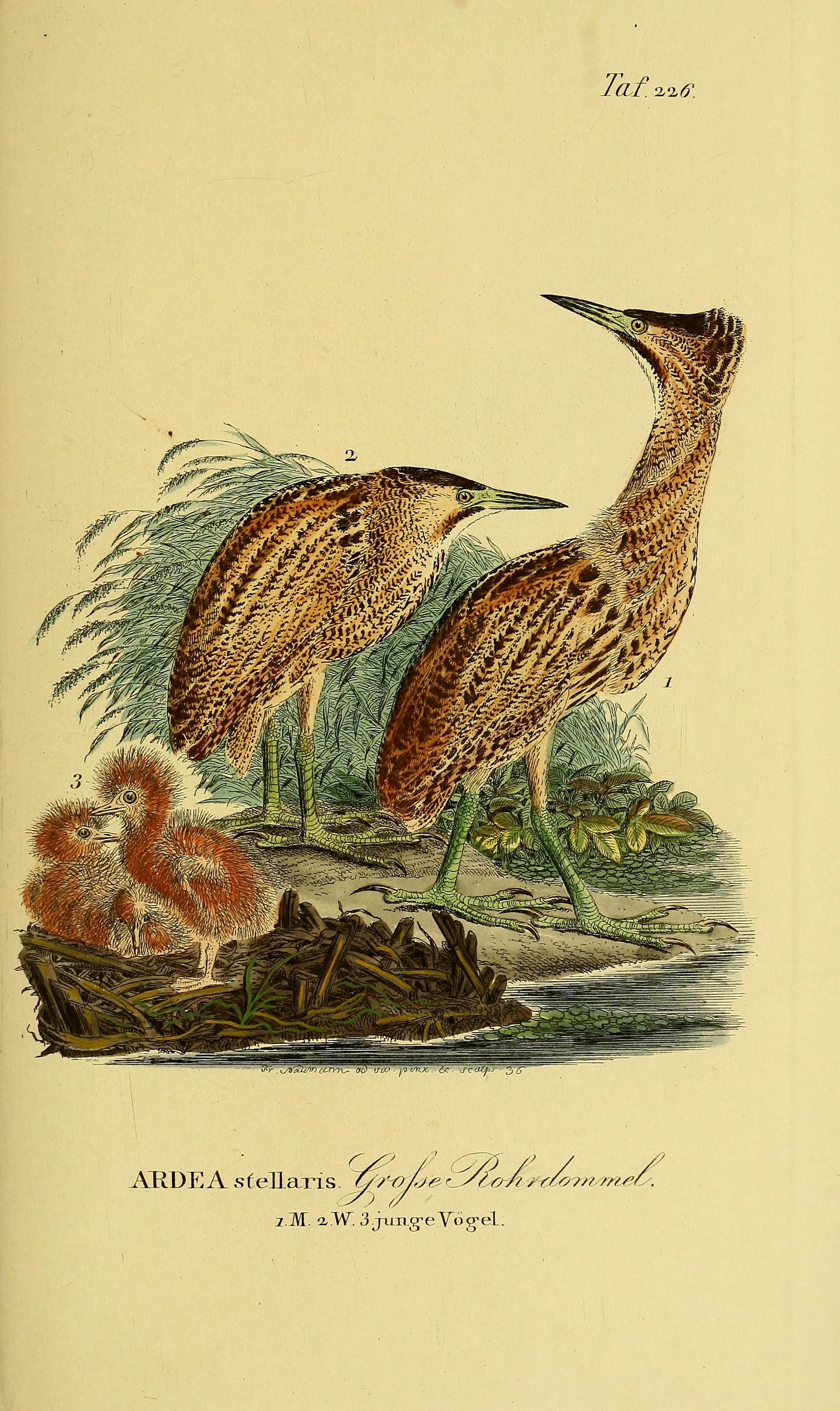
Bitterns. An 1820 illustration (Germany)

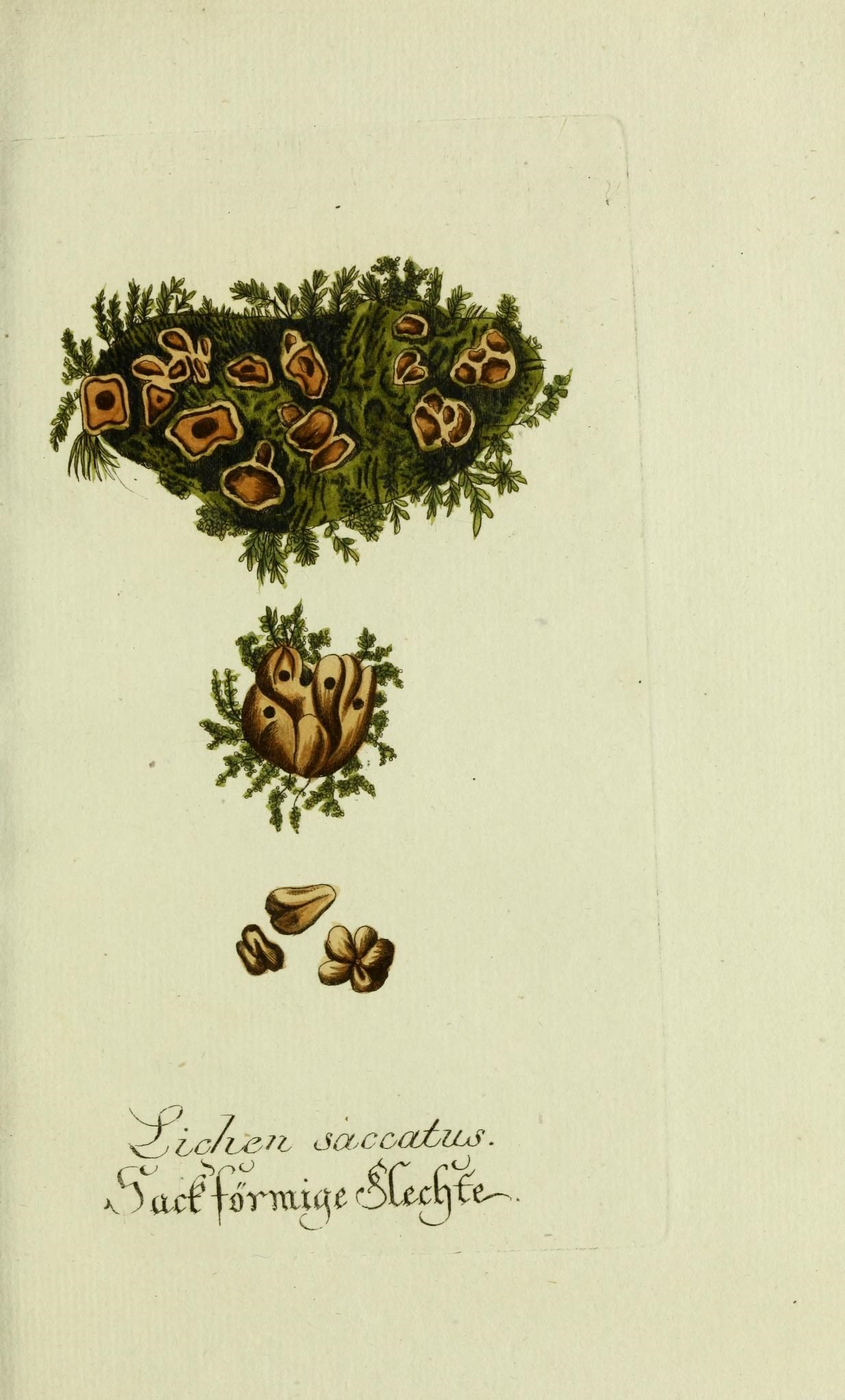
A lichen in Plantarum indigenarum et exoticarum icones ad vivum coloratae oder Sammlung nach der Natur gemalter Abbildungen inn- und ausländischer Pflanzen, für Liebhaber und Beflissene der Botanik (1792)

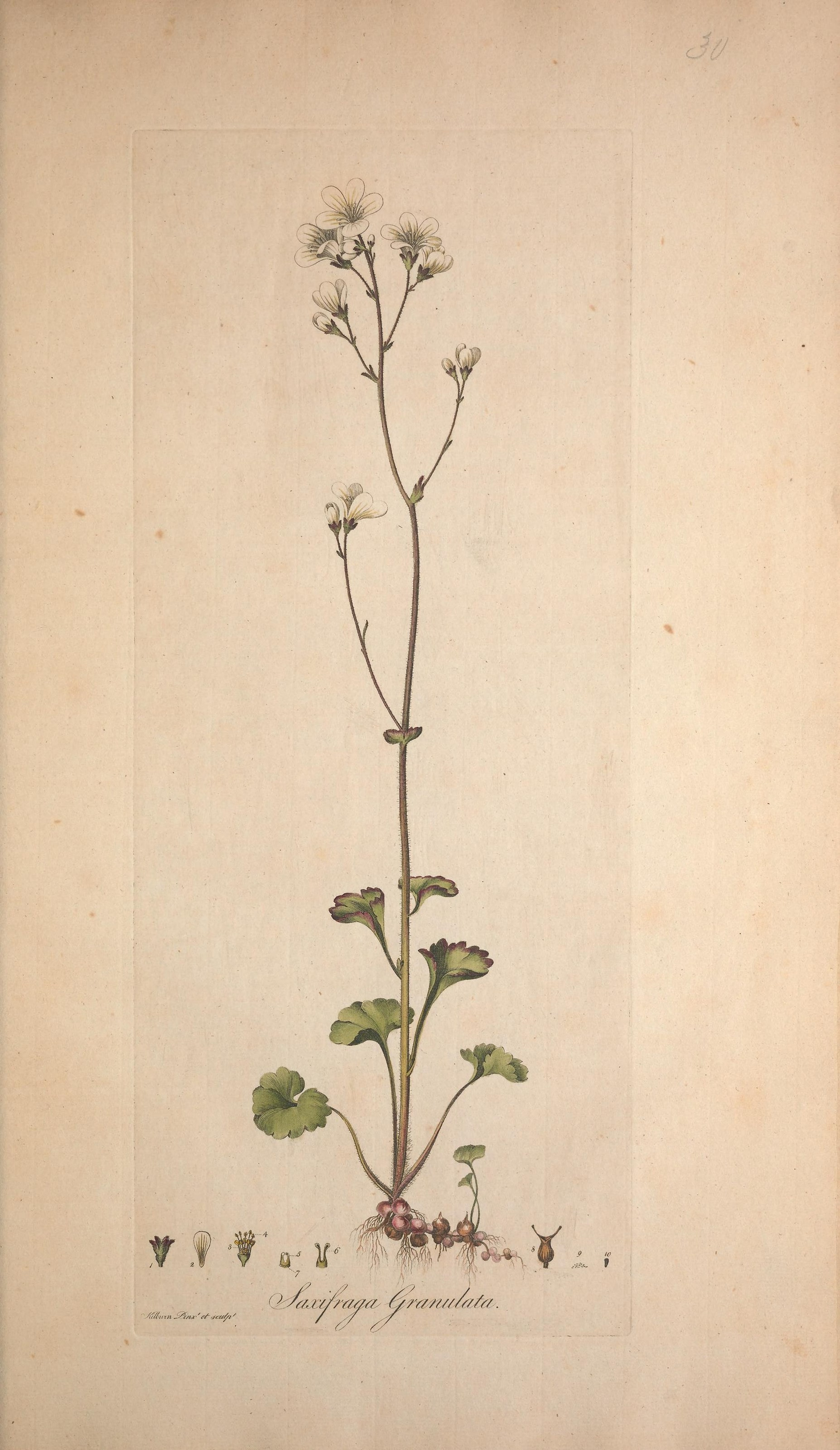
Saxifraga granulata in Flora Londinensis Many species of this Genus were cultivated in the garden at Cranmore.

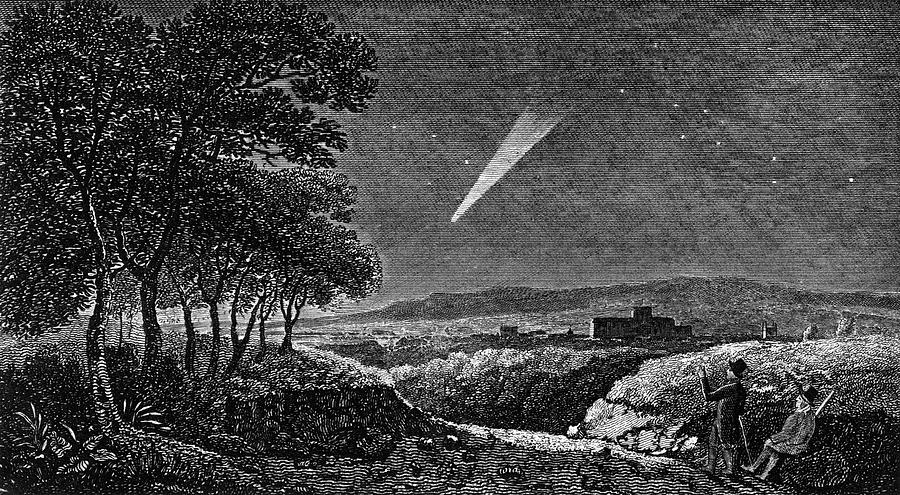
Great Comet of 1811

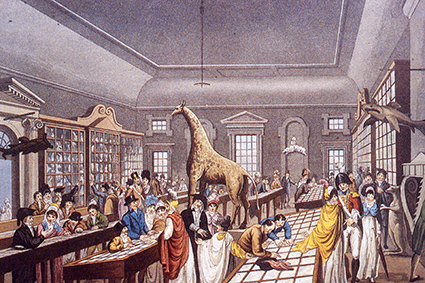
The Old Museum, Regent House Trinity College

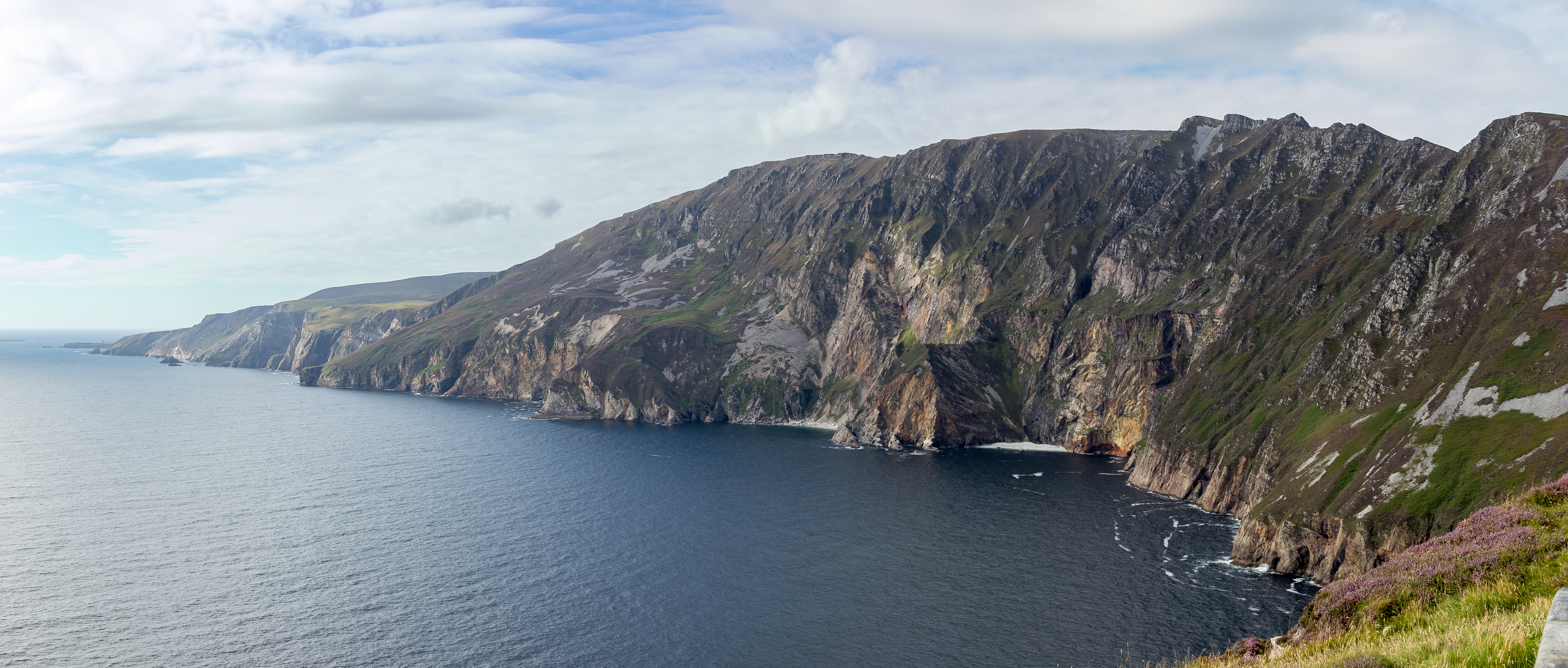
Slieve League Arctic-alpine plants

== See also ==
- Late Enlightenment

== General references ==
- Boulger, George Simonds. "Templeton, John (1766-1825)" . Dictionary of National Biography. Vol. 56. pp. 54–55.
- Thomas Dix Hincks Biography of J. Templeton, Esq. The Magazine of Natural History (Loudon) 1828 Volume 1: 403–406 continued 1829 Volume 2: 305–310
- Kertland, M.P.H. 1966. Bi-centenary of the birth of John Templeton, A.L.S. 1766–1825. Irish Naturalists' Journal 15 :229 -232. Pl.4.
- Kertland, M.P.H. 1967. The specimens of Templeton's algae in the Queen's University Herbarium. Irish Naturalists' Journal 15: 318 – 322.
- Pilcher, B. 1967. The algae of John Templeton in the Ulster Museum. Irish Naturalist Journals' 15: 350 – 353.
- Praeger, R.L.,1950 Some Irish Naturalists. W. Tempest, Dundalgan Press, Dundalk.
- Ross, H.C.G. and Nash, R. 1985. The development of natural history in early nineteenth century Ireland. Linnaeus to Darwin: commentaries on the history of biology and geology. Society for the History of Natural History, London. 1985.
