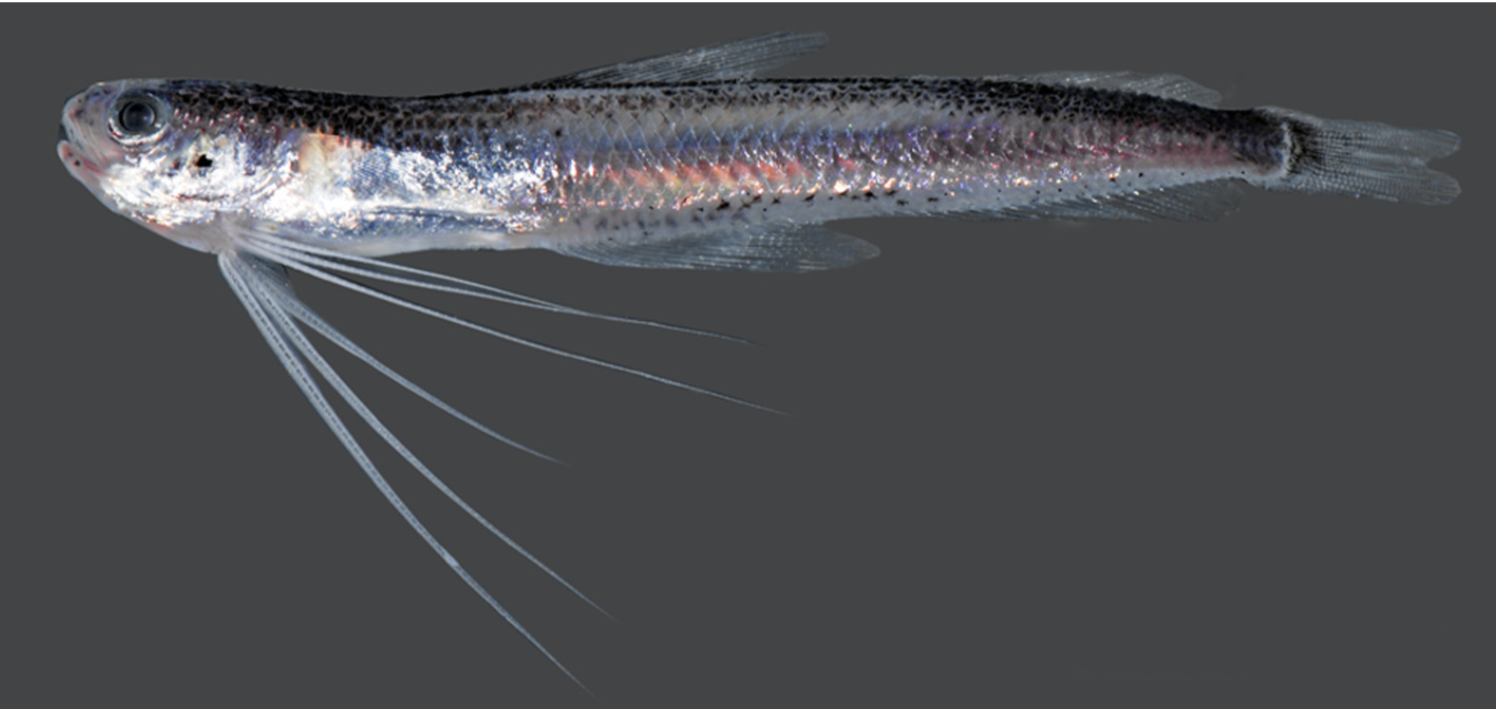
- Bregmaceros bathymaster

Scientific classification
- Kingdom: Animalia
- Phylum: Chordata
- Class: Actinopterygii
- Order: Gadiformes
- Suborder: Bregmacerotoidei
- Family: Bregmacerotidae; T. N. Gill, 1872
- Genus: Bregmaceros; W. Thompson ex Cantor, 1840

Species
- See text

= Codlet =

Codlets Temporal range: 48–0 Ma Middle Eocene to present

Family of fishes

Codlets are a family, Bregmacerotidae, of cod-like fishes, containing the single genus Bregmaceros found in tropical and subtropical waters throughout the world. They are very small fishes, and even the largest, B. lanceolatus, reaches only 11.5 cm (4.5 in) in length.

The codlets appear to be sister to all remaining Gadiformes lineages, even when attempting to account for possible long branch attraction. They are the only member of the suborder Bregmacerotoidei.

== Etymology ==
Their scientific name is from Greek bregma, meaning the top of the head, and keras, meaning "horn"; this refers to their occipital ray (a spine emerging from the top of the head).

== Species ==
Currently, 17 species in this genus are recognized:

- Bregmaceros anchovia Ho, Endo & Lee, 2020 (false anchovy codlet)
- Bregmaceros arabicus D'Ancona & Cavinato, 1965
- Bregmaceros atlanticus Goode & Bean, 1886 (antenna codlet)
- Bregmaceros bathymaster D. S. Jordan & Bollman, 1890 (codlet)
- Bregmaceros cantori Milliken & Houde, 1984 (striped codlet)
- Bregmaceros cayorum Nichols, 1952
- Bregmaceros houdei Saksena & Richards, 1986 (stellate codlet)
- Bregmaceros japonicus S. Tanaka (I), 1908 (Japanese codlet)
- Bregmaceros lanceolatus S. C. Shen, 1960
- Bregmaceros mcclellandi W. Thompson, 1840 (spotted codlet, Macclelland's unicorn-cod, unicorn cod)
- Bregmaceros moseri Harold & Baltzegar, 2023 (gyre codlet)
- Bregmaceros nectabanus Whitley, 1941 (smallscale codlet)
- Bregmaceros neonectabanus S. Masuda, Ozawa & Tabeta, 1986
- Bregmaceros pescadorus S. C. Shen, 1960
- Bregmaceros pseudolanceolatus Torii, Javonillo & Ozawa, 2004 (false lance codlet)
- Bregmaceros rarisquamosus Munro, 1950 (big-eye unicorn-cod)
- Bregmaceros retrodorsalis Ho & Endo, 2020 (back-fin codlet)

=== Fossil species ===
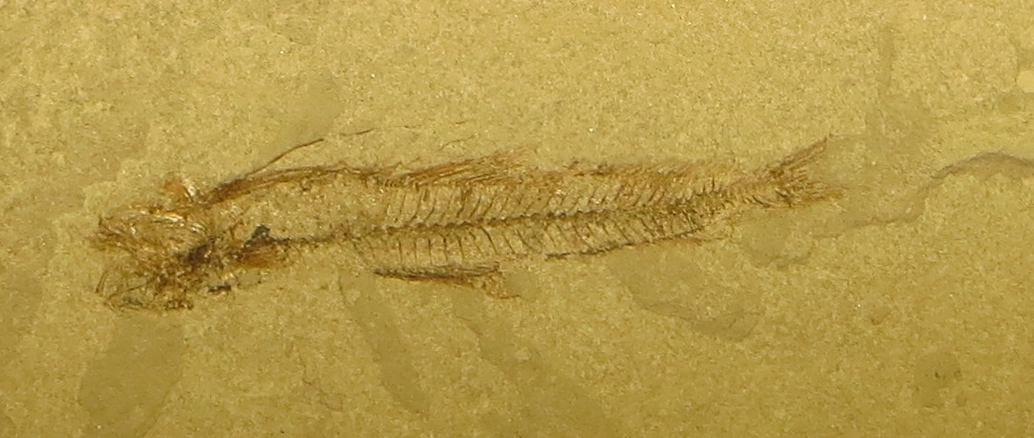
Fossil of Bregmaceros albyi from Italy

Fossils of Bregmaceros are found from the Eocene to the Quaternary (age range: from 37.2 to 0.0 million years ago). They are known from various localities in Europe, North America, Africa, and Australasia. A few are known from articulated fossils' skeletons, but a vast majority of fossil bregmacerotid remains are only from isolated, diagnostic otoliths. About 14 fossil Bregmaceros species are known, with two from articulated skeletons and 12 known from otoliths:

- †Bregmaceros albyi (Sauvage, 1880) (B. bosniaski (Sauvage, 1880)) - Miocene of Spain, Portugal, Italy, Algeria, Gabon, Greece, Malta, Austria, Poland, the Czech Republic & the eastern United States, and Pliocene of Spain, Italy & Greece. Known from both fossil skeletons and isolated otoliths.
- †Bregmaceros antiquus Schwarzhans, 1980 - late Eocene of New Zealand [otolith]
- †Bregmaceros brihandensis Nolf, 1988 - late Eocene of France & Italy [otolith]
- †Bregmaceros catulus (Schubert, 1908) - early Oligocene of the Czech Republic [otolith]
- †Bregmaceros deklaszi Schwarzhans, 2013 - Oligocene of France, early Miocene of Italy, mid-late Miocene of Gabon [otolith]
- †Bregmaceros felkeri Schwarzhans, 2007 - middle Eocene of Germany [otolith]
- †Bregmaceros filamentosus (Priem, 1908) - mid-late Eocene of Georgia & Iran, Oligocene of Poland, Romania & North Caucasus (Russia), potentially Miocene of Egypt & the Czech Republic. Known from fossil skeletons and isolated otoliths.
- †Bregmaceros hybridus Schwarzhans, 2013 - early Miocene of Italy, early-mid Miocene of Spain, mid-late Miocene of Gabon [otolith]
- †Bregmaceros luellingensis Schwarzhans & Wienrich, 2009 - early Miocene of Mexico, middle Miocene of Germany [otolith]
- †Bregmaceros minimus (Frost, 1934) - middle Eocene of England, late Eocene of Ukraine [otolith]
- †Bregmaceros minutus Stinton, 1958 - middle Miocene of South Australia [otolith]
- †Bregmaceros oblongus Schwarzhans, 1977 - early Oligocene of Germany [otolith]
- †Bregmaceros prosoponos Grenfell, 1984 - early Miocene of New Zealand [otolith]
- †Bregmaceros troelli Dante & Frizzell, 1965 - middle Eocene of Texas, US [otolith]

A potential extinct relative, Bregmacerina, is known from the Early Miocene of Russia, where it inhabited the Paratethys. It shares close similarities to Bregmaceros in the reduction of the first dorsal fin, but differs in other aspects. It remains uncertain whether it is an actual member of the Bregmacerotidae.
