= John Vandeleur Stewart =

Irish naturalist, ornithologist and bird collector

John Vandeleur Stewart (4 October 1802 – 1872) was an Irish naturalist, ornithologist and bird collector.

Stewart lived at Rockhill, Letterkenny. He was a landowner and a member of the Carlton Club. He was High Sheriff of Donegal in 1838.

== Selected works ==
- Loudon, J. C.; Denson, John; Charlesworth, Edward (1832). "A list of, and remarks on, some of the mammalious animals, and the birds, met with in the three years preceding December 4, 1828 on the Northern coast of Donegal". Magazine of natural history and journal of zoology, botany, mineralogy, geology and meteorology. Vol. 5. printed for Longman, Rees, Orme, Brown, and Green. pp. 578–586.
- various contributions to The Natural History of Ireland
