= Elizabeth Ball =

Elizabeth Ball may refer to:

- Elizabeth Ball (politician), Canadian politician and actress
- Elizabeth Ball (soccer) (born 1995), American soccer player
- Anne Elizabeth Ball (1808–1872), Irish botanist
