= Anne Elizabeth Ball =

Irish botanist, algologist, and botanical illustrator

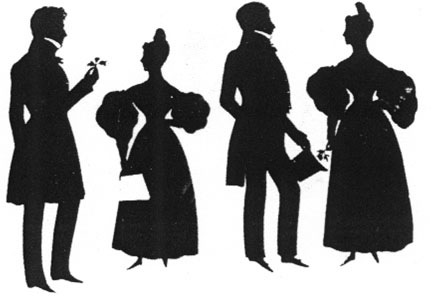
- Left to Right Robert, Anne, Bent and Mary Ball
- Born: 1808; Cobh, County Cork, Ireland
- Died: 1872 (aged 63–64); Dublin, Ireland
- Scientific career
- Fields: Algology, botany

Anne Elizabeth Ball (1808–1872) was an Irish botanist, amateur algologist, and botanical illustrator. Born in Cobh 1808, Ball was a sister of naturalist Robert Ball and zoologist Mary Ball (1812–1898). The siblings became interested in natural history through the passion of their father, Bob Stawell Ball.

== Background ==
In 1818, Anne Ball moved from her birthplace of Cobh to Youghal, another seaport town in County Cork, with her family and it was here that Ball, in her early twenties, began to collect and study marine algae. In 1837, her sister and father moved away from Cork to Dublin, where she resided until her death. Anne continued her algae collecting in Dublin and, although not a member of the Dublin scientific societies, Anne established herself as a successful algologist. However, as was then the custom, her work was published by male naturalists such as William Henry Harvey (a friend of her brother's), James Mackay, and others. However these relationships were not entirely one-sided. William Harvey supported and encouraged her work, naming the genus Ballia and the species Cladophora balliana for her. Ball collected the original specimen of Cladophora balliana on 16 May 1843 at Clontarf. They also collaborated on Harvey's Phycologia Britannica (1846–1851). Ball also contributed illustrated records of hydroids to William Thompson and these were published in volume four of The Natural History of Ireland in 1856.

== Legacy ==
Ball died at home in Belmont Avenue, Dublin, in 1872. Her extant collections were later housed in the herbaria at University College Cork; at the Royal (later Irish National) Botanic Gardens, Glasnevin, which acquired her drawings of seaweeds and fungi; at the Ulster Museum; and her letters and plants at Kew Gardens The specimens deposited at Kew Gardens were, most likely, transferred to the Natural History Museum, London around 1961 under the terms of the Morton Agreement.
