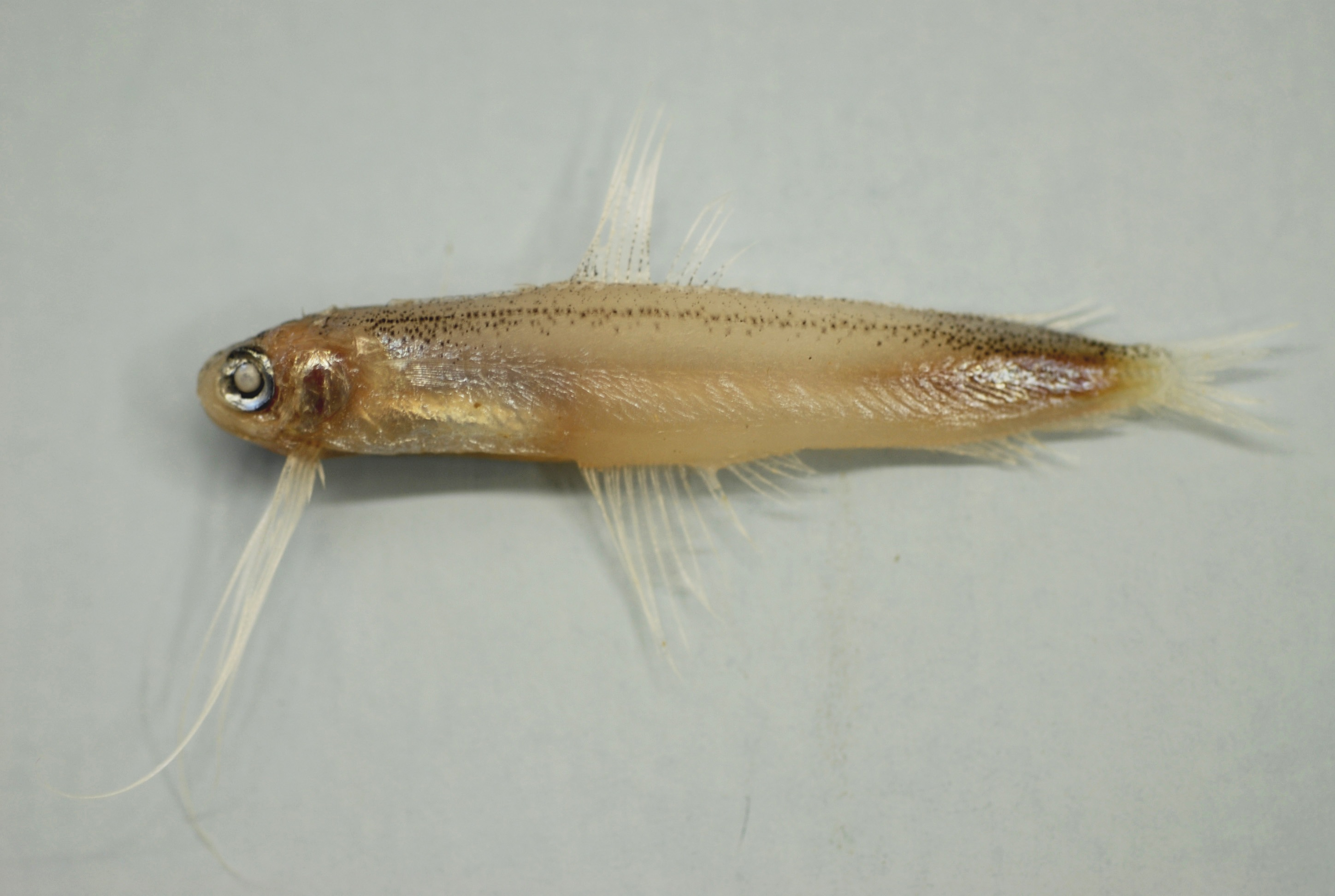

Conservation status
- Least Concern (IUCN 3.1)

Scientific classification
- Kingdom: Animalia
- Phylum: Chordata
- Class: Actinopterygii
- Order: Gadiformes
- Family: Bregmacerotidae
- Genus: Bregmaceros
- Species: B. atlanticus

Binomial name
- Bregmaceros atlanticus Goode & Bean, 1886

= Antenna codlet =

Species of fish

The antenna codlet, Bregmaceros atlanticus, is a species of codlet found in the subtropical zones of the oceans. This species grows to 6.7 cm (2.6 in) in total length.
