= William Thompson (naturalist) =

Irish naturalist (1805–1852)

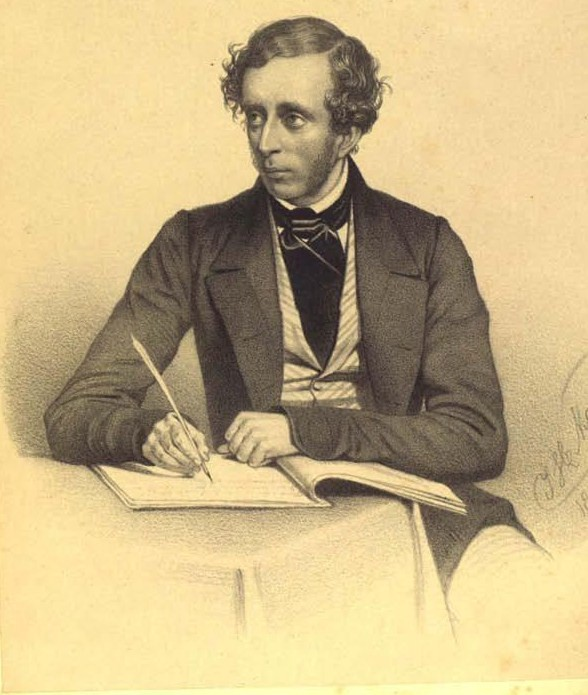
- Born: 2 December 1805; Belfast
- Died: 17 February 1852 (aged 46); London
- Education: Royal Belfast Academical Institution
- Known for: The Natural History of Ireland
- Scientific career
- Fields: Ornithologist, marine biologist, author

William Thompson (2 December 1805 – 17 February 1852) was an Irish naturalist celebrated for his founding studies of the natural history of Ireland, especially in ornithology and marine biology. Thompson published numerous notes on the distribution, breeding, eggs, habitat, song, plumage, behaviour, nesting and food of birds. These formed the basis of his four-volume The Natural History of Ireland, and were much used by contemporary and later authors such as Francis Orpen Morris.

== Early years ==
Thompson was born in the booming maritime city of Belfast, Ireland, the eldest son of a linen merchant, whose wealth would later permit Thompson to fund his own research without an academic affiliation. Thompson attended the newly formed Royal Belfast Academical Institution, where he got a degree in Biological Science. Founded by, amongst others, John Templeton, the school had a strong natural history section that produced a cohort of prominent naturalists. In 1826 he went on a Grand Tour accompanied by cousin George Langtry, a Fortwilliam, Belfast shipowner. They starting in the Netherlands then travelled through Belgium down the Rhine to Switzerland and on to Rome and Naples. They returned via Florence, Geneva and Paris.

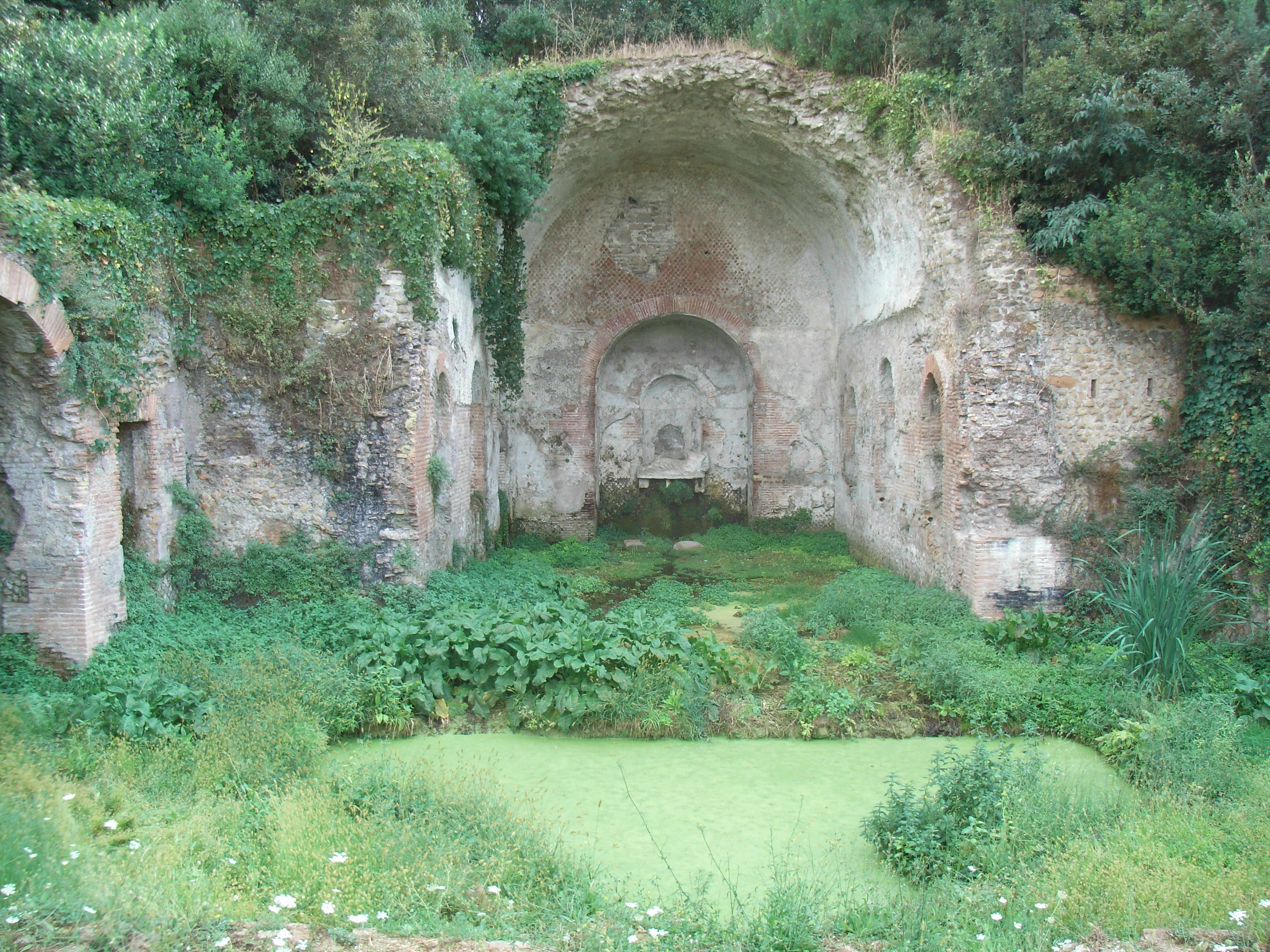
Thompson found the Nympheum of Egeria near Rome especially appealing with its classical and poetic associations

Thompson's first scientific paper, The Birds of the Copeland Islands, was published in 1827 shortly after he joined the Belfast Natural History Society. In these years he became a member of the Belfast Literary Society.

== Personal life ==
William Thompson was a man of regular habits. For four hours after breakfast he was engaged in scientific research, preparation for the press and correspondence. Exercise for two or three hours followed. The interval between dinner and tea was given to the literature of the day and when the claims of local societies left him free he would retire to the study for two or three additional hours of scientific work. With spring came a visit to London where he enlarged his taste for literature, history, biography and the fine arts as well as science. He also visited most of the scenic parts of England and Scotland. In the summer the seaside with family and then in the Autumn tours with friends, attendance at meetings of the British Association and to shooting quarters in Scotland.

== Research ==
Thompson contributed up-to-date information on the birds of Ireland to Selby's The Magazine of Zoology and Botany, The Annals of Natural History, The Magazine of Natural History, and the Annals and Magazine of Natural History, and prepared the first comprehensive list of Ireland's birds for the 1840 meeting of the British Association for the Advancement of Science at Glasgow. Other work, primarily about birds, was published in the Proceedings of the Zoological Society of London and the London and Edinburgh Philosophical Journal. These papers formed the basis of his seminal work—The Natural History of Ireland—published in four volumes between 1849 and 1851.

== Birds ==
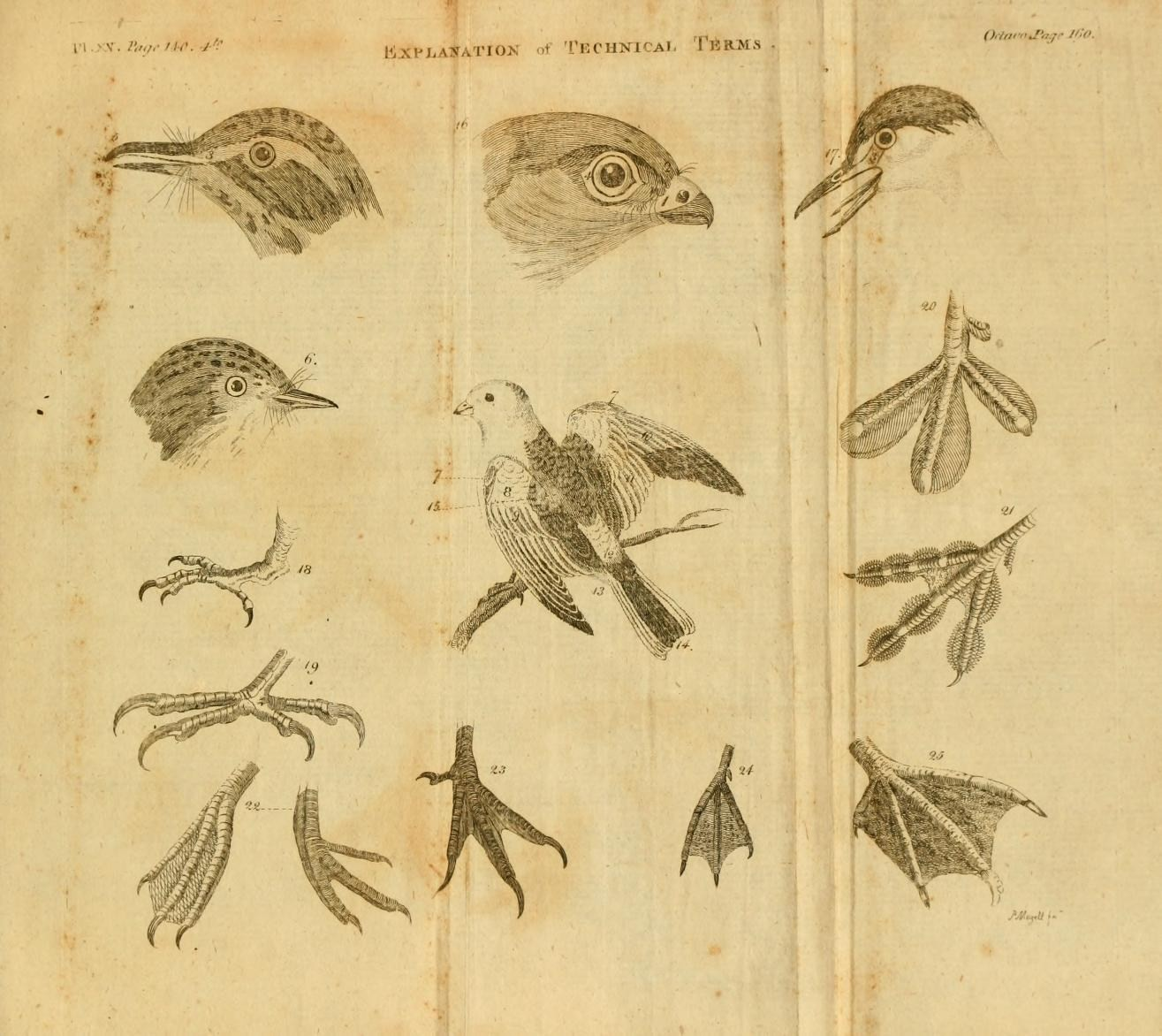
Thomas Pennant British zoology, 1776. Plate illustrating bird anatomy

Thompson either owned or had access to a very comprehensive ornithological library exemplared by the Ornithological Dictionary, Le Règne Animal, Selby's Illustrations of British Ornithology, Coenraad Jacob Temminck's Manuel d'ornithologie ou Tableau systématique des oiseaux qui se trouvent en Europe (Sepps & Dufour, Amsterdam, Paris 1815–40), William Edward Parry, 1821 Journal of a Voyage for the Discovery of a North-West Passage from the Atlantic to the Pacific; Performed in the years 1819–'20, in His Majecty's Ships Hecla and Griper ... with an Appendix Containing the Scientific and Other Observations London (1821), William Swainson and John Richardson, 1831. Fauna boreali-Americana: part second, the birds, Charles Lucien Bonaparte's Synopsis of the Birds of the United States, Peter Simon Pallas' Zoographia Russo-Asiatica. His other tool was his own and other private bird collections and those of the museums in Belfast and Dublin.

The major bird publications are the 1841 Report on the fauna of Ireland (Vertebrata) for the British Association for the Advancement of Science which is an early biogeographic work contrasting the vertebrates of Britain and Ireland. Thompson notes that with a few exceptions the native birds of Britain as then accepted by Jardine and Selby are all found in Ireland. and The Natural History of Ireland is, in the section on birds, a Monograph with a literary style, sometimes anecdotal giving information on anatomy, plumage, behaviour, nesting and breeding, seasonality and distribution.

Thompson documented many rare in Ireland bird species, variously collected by his network of correspondents. Among birds these included the first Irish occurrences of Bonaparte's Gull and American Bittern. He was a sceptical observer writing on the Red Kite 'The name of "Kite" appears commonly in the catalogues of birds given in the Statistical Surveys of the Irish counties, and elsewhere; but, as the larger species of the falconidae are in some places called Kite and Glead, as well as Goshawk or Goose-hawk, there can be no doubt that the buzzard, or some common species, was meant.

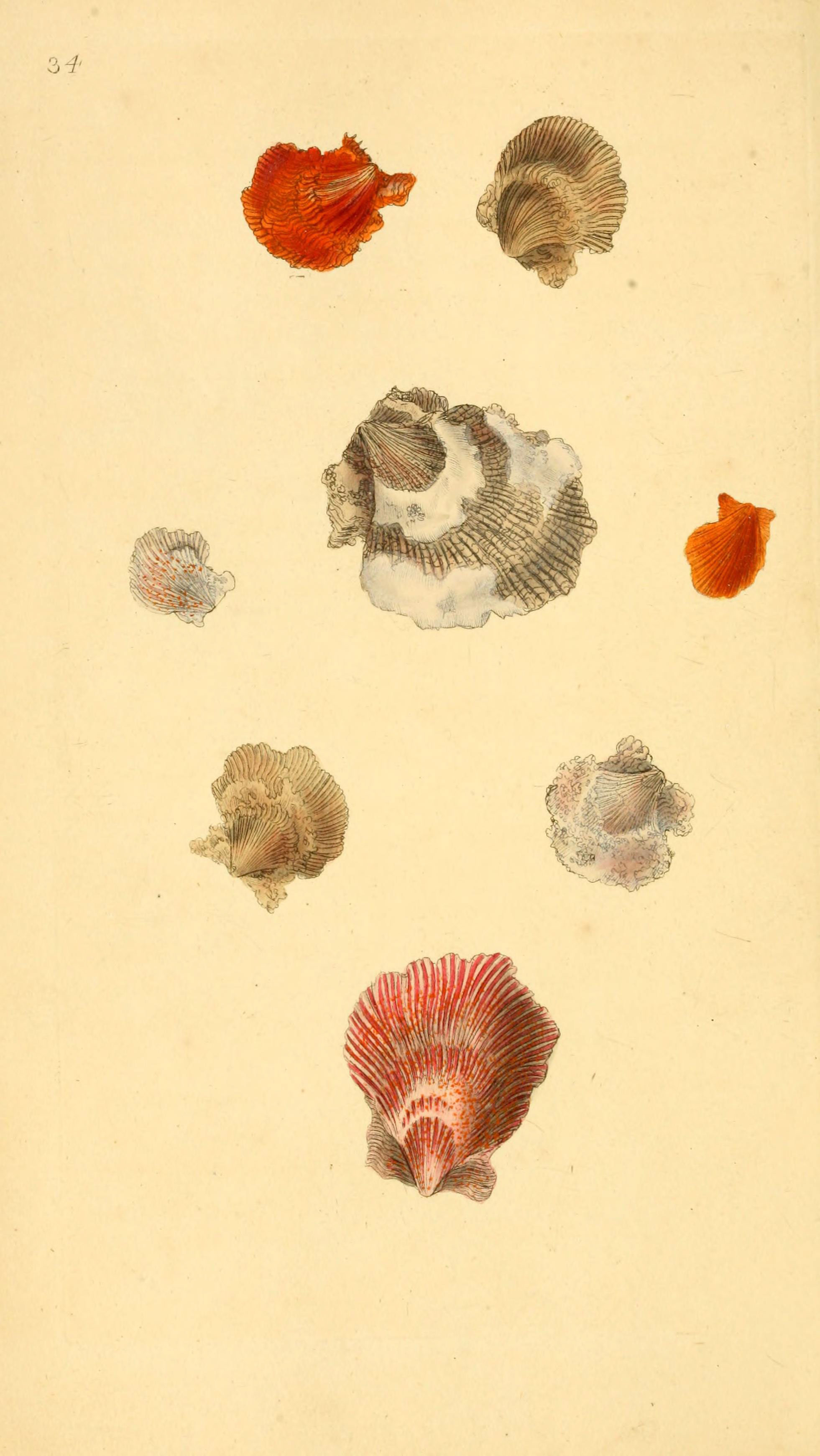
Plate 34 from Edward Donovan, s The Natural History of British Shells: Including Figures and Descriptions of All the Species Hitherto Discovered in Great Britain, Systematically Arranged in the Linnean Manner, With Scientific and General Observations On Each. (1799-1803)

== Marine biology ==
In 1834 Thompson began studying the distribution of marine animals in space (depth range) and time (seasonality). His first research was with Edward Forbes conducting dredging in the Irish Sea. Other participants were Robert MacAndrew, John Gwyn Jeffreys, the Yoxford, Suffolk shell collector George Barlee (1794-1861) and his fellow Irishmen Robert Ball, Edmund Getty and George Crawford Hyndman. In 1835 he travelled in France, Switzerland and Germany with Forbes. Then in 1841 he joined Forbes and Thomas Abel Brimage Spratt on the Beacon commanded by Thomas Graves and working in the Mediterranean and Aegean. The expedition lasted eighteen months and conducted more than one hundred dredging operations at depths varying from 1 to 130 fathoms, as well as shore-based studies. Thompson focused on the depth range of algae, his main collection of which is in the Ulster Museum herbarium and consists of five large albums (Note: Algae collection. Ulster Museum (BEL) catalogue numbers: F7953 — F8151, F8182 — F8393, F8394 — F8595, F8580 — F8847 and F8848 — F8937.) containing specimens collected by Thompson himself, William Henry Harvey, Moon, D. Landsborough, Robert Ball, Thomas Coulter, George Crawford Hyndman, William McCalla and many others. His records are also reported by others such as Gifford (1853):- Griffithsia simplicifilum from "...Isle of Wight, in August, 1841, by Messers. R.Ball. and W. Thompson."

George Dickie's Flora of Ulster contains records of Thompson's frequent botanical contributions and his Hortus Siccus and he is mentioned in William Baird's Natural History of British Entomostraca.

== Later years ==
Thompson corresponded extensively on all aspects of natural history with naturalists in both Britain and Ireland, including with zoologist Thomas Bell who was at the heart of the English scientific establishment and two of the "Grandees" of the Zoological Society, Nicholas Aylward Vigors, William Ogilby.

As Thompson's reputation spread, information was passed to him by interested observers all over Ireland. However his health became poor around 1847 or 1848, when he was 42, and he suffered from heart trouble from 1847. In 1852 Thompson died of a heart attack in London where he had been tended by his friends William Yarrell, author of British Birds, Edward Forbes, Edwin Lankester, of the Ray Society and George Busk. He died unmarried.

Excerpts from Thompson's letters and his notes were edited and published as the fourth volume of The Natural History of Ireland, which focused on invertebrates and non-avian vertebrates, by George Dickie, James Ramsey Garrett and Robert Patterson in 1856, four years after his death.

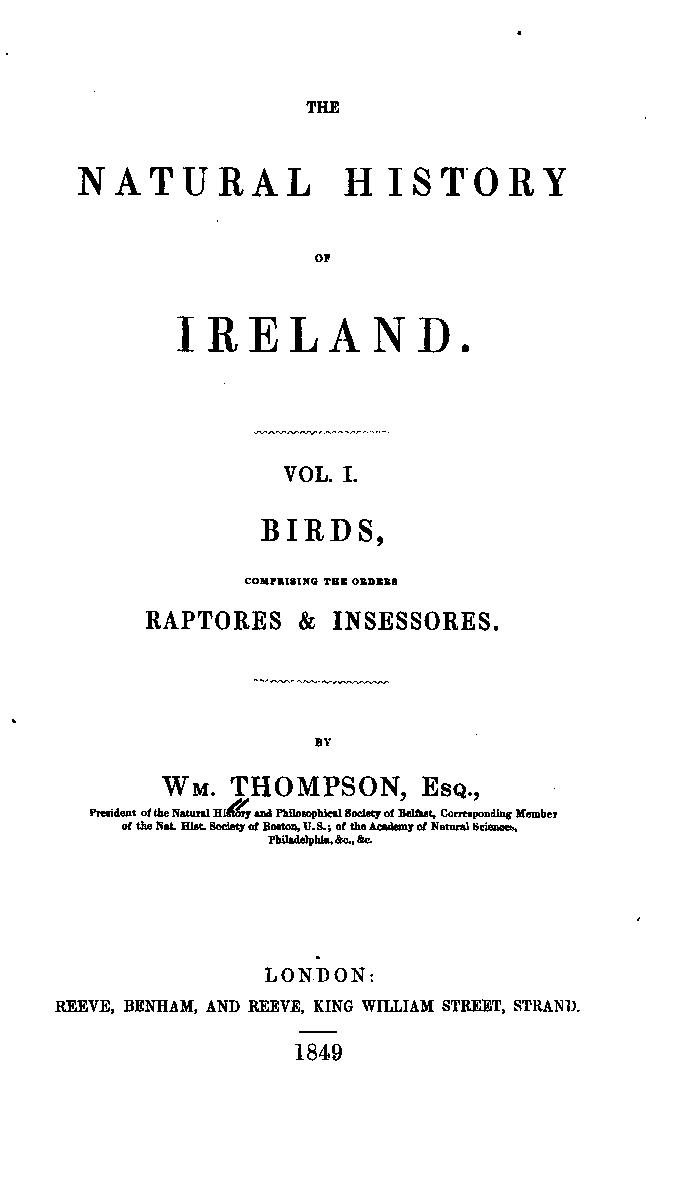
The Natural History of Ireland Volume 1 Frontis

== Works ==
Partial list from over eighty. A complete list is found in The Natural History of Ireland (see External Links).

- 1837 On the Pollan (Coregonus pollan Thompson) of Lough Neagh Magazine of zoology and botany 1:247-251 online
- "Abstract of paper on Irish Algae, read before the Natural History Society of Belfast on January 20. 1836". The Magazine of Natural History. 9: 147–151. 1836.
- 1833 on an immature specimen of the Long-tailed Manis (Manis tetradactyla, Linn.) from Sierra Leone. Proceedings of the Zoological Society of London II 28.online
- 1833 On the Occurrence of the Young of the Arctic Tern (Sterna Arctica, Temm.) in the North of Ireland Proceedings of the Zoological Society of London II:33 online
- 1833 On the Occurrence of the Black-headed Gull (Larus capistratus, Temm.) in the North of Ireland Proceedings of the Zoological Society of London II:33 online
- 1834 Notice of the cuckoo (Cuculus canorus Linn.) Proceedings of the Zoological Society of London II:29 online
- 1834 Observations of some of native Mammalia, birds and fishes, including additions to the British fauna. List of land and freshwater Mollusca new to Ireland.Transactions of the Linnean Society of London Minute Book Linnean Society 1834 published 1837 online See also The London and Edinburgh philosophical magazine and journal of science. 5: 298 online.
- 1835 on the Teredo navalis and Limnoria terebrans, as at present existing in certain localities on the coasts of the British Islands. Edinb. New Phil. J. 18: 121–130.
- 1835 [Catalogue of] Birds, fishes etc. new to the British and Irish Fauna Proceedings of the Zoological Society of London 3: 77–84. Proceedings of the Zoological Society of London II:77 online
- 1837 [On Vertebratae new to Science to Britain to Ireland etc] 52-63 Proceedings of the Zoological Society of London 1837:52-63 online
- 1838 III Contributions to the Natural History of Ireland No 5 On the Birds of the Order Insessores Annals of natural history 1:12-26 online
- 1838 On the Snowy Owl (Surnia nyctea Dum.) Annals of natural history 1:241-245 online
- 1838 On fishes new to Ireland Annals of natural history 1:348-359 online
- 1839 On a new Sub‐genus of Fishes, allied to Ophidium Transactions of the Zoological Society of London 1839:207-212 Plate XXXVIII online
- 1839 with Robert Patterson On some Snow Crystals observed on 14 January 1838 Magazine of Natural History 3:107-122 online
- 1839 On fishes new to Ireland Annals of natural history 2:14-28 online
- 1840 Note on the occurrence at various times of the bottle-nosed whale (Hyperoodon butzkoph, Lancep.) on the coast of Ireland; and its nearly simultaneous appearance on different parts of the British coast in the autumn of 1839. Annals of natural history 4, 375–381.online
- 1839 On fishes; containing a notice of one species new to the British fauna and of others to the Irish fauna Annals of natural history 2:266-273 online
- 1839 On the breeding of the Woodcock (Scolopax rusticola in Ireland Annals of natural history 2:337-448 online
- 1839 Observations on several British Fishes including the Description of a new Species Annals of natural history 2:402-423

online

- 1840 Additions to the fauna of Ireland. Annals of natural history 5, 6–14. online
- 1840 Additions to the fauna of Ireland. Annals of natural history 5: 245–257.online
- with Goodsir, J. 1840 Description of Limneus involutus Harvey MS. with an account of the anatomy of the animal. Annals of natural history 5: 22–25. online
- 1840 On the Mollusca of Ireland [Species Unica]. Annals of natural history 5:84 online
- 1840 Contributions towards a knowledge of the Mollusca Nudibranchia and Mollusca Tunicata of Ireland, with descriptions of apparently some new species of invertebrata. Annals of natural history 5: 84–102 Plate 2.online
- 1840 On a new genus of fishes from India. Annals of natural history, 4 (6), 184–187.online
- 1841 Report on the fauna of Ireland (Vertebrata) Report of the British Association for the Advancement of Science 1841 online
- 1840 On a minute alga which colours Ballydrain Lake, in the county of Antrim. Annals and Magazine of Natural History 5: 75-84, figs 1-3. online
- 1841 Catalogue of the land and freshwater Mollusca of Ireland. Annals & Magazine of Natural History 6: 16–34 online
- 1841 Catalogue of the land and freshwater Mollusca of Ireland. Annals & Magazine of Natural History 6: 109–126 online
- 1841 Catalogue of the land andfreshwater Mollusca of Ireland. Annals & Magazine of Natural History 6: 194–208 online
- 1841 Additions to the fauna of Ireland. Annals & Magazine of Natural History 7: 477–481 online
- 1841 Notes on British Char, Salmo Umbla, Linn., S. Salvelinus, Don. Annals & Magazine of Natural History 6: 444 –online
- 1842 Cycostoma elegans Lam. an Irish shell. Annals & Magazine of Natural History 8: 228.online
- 1842 Results of deep dredging off the Mull of Galloway, by Capt. Beechey, R.N.. Annals & Magazine of Natural History 10: 21–24.online
- 1843 Report on the fauna of Ireland: div. Invertebrata. Drawn up, at the request of the British Association. Rep. Meet. Br. Assoc. Advancem. Science London, 13: 245–291.online
- 1844 Additions to the fauna of Ireland. Annals & Magazine of Natural History 13: 430–440.online
- 1845 Additions to the fauna of Ireland, including descriptions of some apparently new species of Invertebrata. Annals & Magazine of Natural History 15: 308–322. online
- 1846 Notice of a bottle-nosed whale Hyperoodon butzkoph, Lancep. obtained in Belfast Bay in October 1845. Annals and Magazine of Natural History. 17, 150–153.online
- 1846 Additions to the fauna of Ireland, including species new to that of Britain; with notes on rare species. Annals and Magazine of Natural History. 18, 310–315. online
- 1846 Additions to the fauna of Ireland, including a few species unrecorded in that of Britain; with the description of an apparently new Glossiphonia. Annals & Magazine of Natural History 18: 383–397.online
- 1847 Note on the Teredo norvegica (T. navalis, Turton, not Linn), Xylophaga dorsalis, Limnoria terebrans and Chelura terebrans, combined in destroying the submerged wood-work at the harbour of Ardrossan on the coast of Ayrshire. Annals & Magazine of Natural History 20: 157–164.online
- 1847 Additions to the fauna of Ireland. Annals & Magazine of Natural History 20: 169–176.online
- 1848 Additions to the fauna of Ireland. Annals & Magazine of Natural History 1: 62–65.online
- 1849 Additions to the fauna of Ireland. Annals & Magazine of Natural History 3: 351–357.online
- 1851 Time of spawning of British Crustacea. Annals & Magazine of Natural History 7: 501–502.online
- 1853 Supplementary report on the fauna of Ireland. Report for the British Association for the Advancement of Science : 286–290.online
- The Natural History of Ireland. Reeve, Benham and Reeve. 1849–1851. Also published by Boehn, London.

Note. The pages Proceedings of the Zoological Society of London, The Magazine of Natural History and Annals & Magazine of Natural History all link to digitised versions of these works provided by Biodiversity Heritage Library.

Thompson was a Member of the Zoological Society of London and a Corresponding Member of The Philadelphia Academy of Natural Sciences and the Boston Society of Natural History.

== Taxon described by him ==
- See Category:Taxa named by William Thompson (naturalist)

== Species names honouring William Thompson ==
- The Sea Louse Lepeophtheirus thompsoni Baird, 1850
- Acipenser thompsoni Ball (in Thompson), 1856,4: 245. synonym of Acipenser sturio (Linnaeus, 1758)
- Bulimus thompsoni (Pfeiffer, 1845) in Pfeiffer, L. 1845. Descriptions of twenty-two new species of land-shells, belonging to the collection of Mr. H. Cuming. Proceedings of the Zoological Society of London 13: 63-68
- Lepeophtheirus thompsoni Baird, 1850
- Thaumantias thompsoni Forbes, 1841, Ann. Nat. Hist.
- Meloscira thompsoni Harvey synononym of Lyngbya thompsonii (Harvey) in Hassall, A.H. (1845). A history of the British freshwater algae, including descriptions of the Desmideae and Diatomaceae. With upwards of one hundred plates, illustrating the various species. Vol. I. pp. [i]-viii, [i]-462, [i.err.]. London, Edinburgh, Paris & Leipzig: S. Highley, H. Baillière; Sunderland & Knox; J.B. Baillière; T.O. Weigel.pdf
- Spirillum thompsoni Hassall, A.H., 1845 A history of the British freshwater algae:278
- Dolichospermum thompsoni Ralfs
- The mollusk Pterinea thompsoni Portlock, 1843 in Report on the geology of the county of Londonderry, and of parts of Tyrone and Fermanagh. Dublin, A. Milliken 1843.
- Hypoplita thompsoni and Pagurus thompsoni Bell in A History of the British Stalk-eyed Crustacea. Paternoster Row, London: John Van Voorst. 1844–1853
