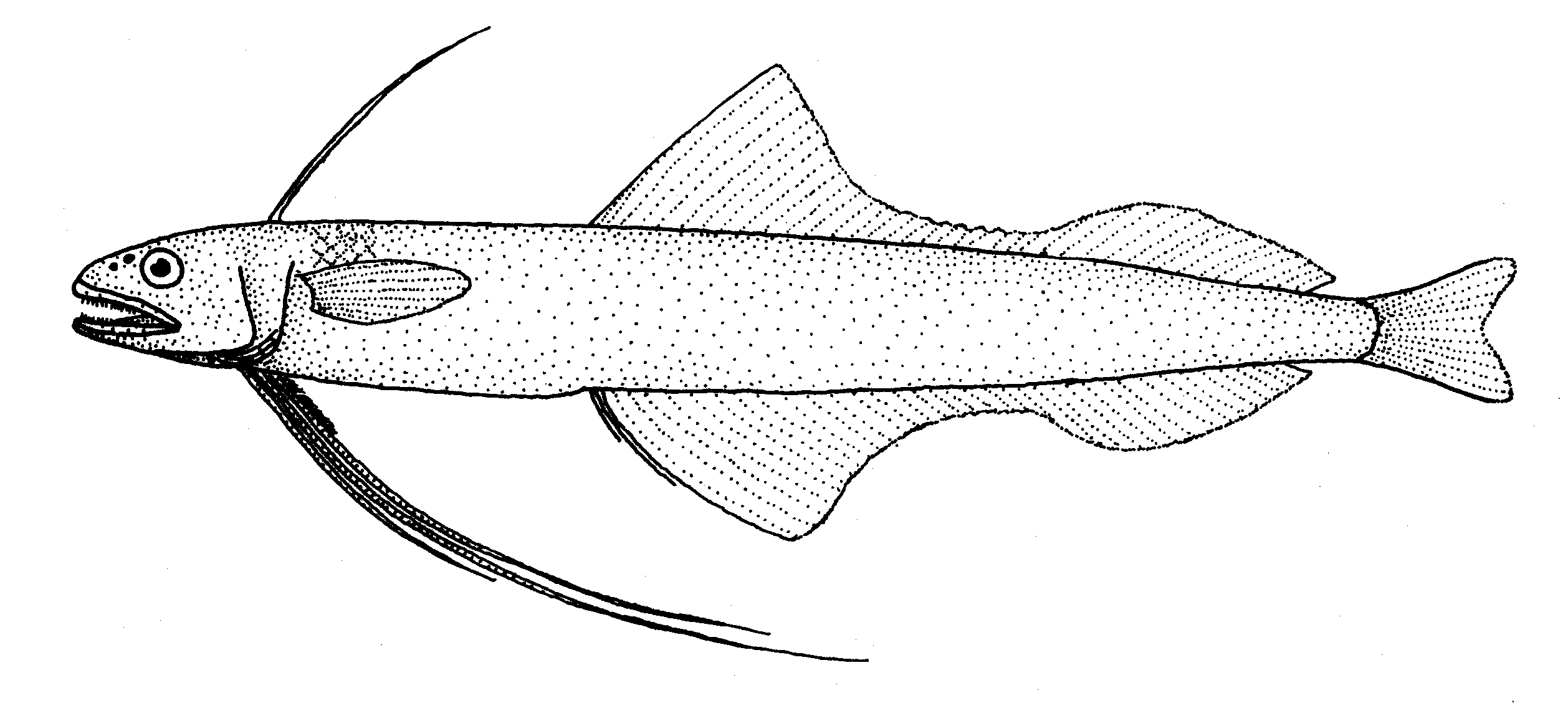
- Drawing by Dr Tony Ayling

Scientific classification
- Kingdom: Animalia
- Phylum: Chordata
- Class: Actinopterygii
- Order: Gadiformes
- Family: Bregmacerotidae
- Genus: Bregmaceros
- Species: B. mcclellandi

Binomial name
- Bregmaceros mcclellandi W. Thompson, 1840

= Spotted codlet =

Species of fish

The spotted codlet, MacClelland's unicorn-cod, or unicorn cod, Bregmaceros mcclellandi, is a small, deepwater codlet fish found in the western Indian Ocean to eastern Thailand. It occurs from the surface to depths of 2,000 m (6,600 ft), and it reaches up to 9.6 cm (3.8 in) in standard length. This species is of commercial importance to local fisheries.

== Etymology ==
The fish's name is based on a manuscript name by Danish naturalist Theodor Edvard Cantor (1809–1860), in honor of his friend John McClelland (1805–1875), a physician and ichthyologist, "whose researches in the Biology and Geology of India are well known".
