= Mary Ball (naturalist) =

Irish naturalist and entomologist

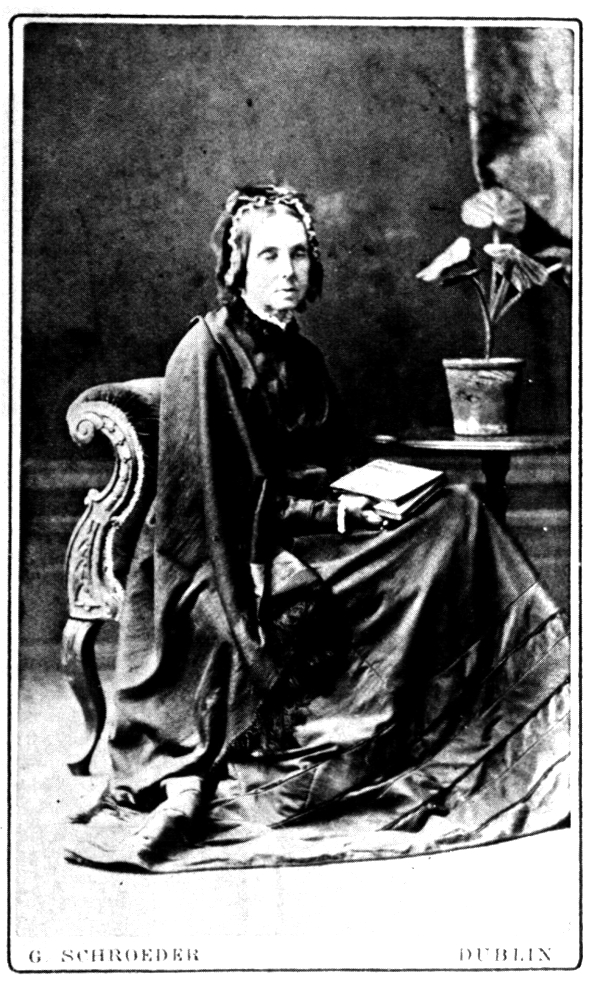
- Ball in later life
- Born: 1812; Cobh, County Cork, Ireland
- Died: 1898 (aged 85–86); Dublin, Ireland
- Scientific career
- Fields: Entomology

Mary Ball (1812–1898) was an Irish naturalist and entomologist most noted for her studies of Odonata and for her discovery of the stridulation in aquatic bugs in the family Corixidae.

== Early life ==
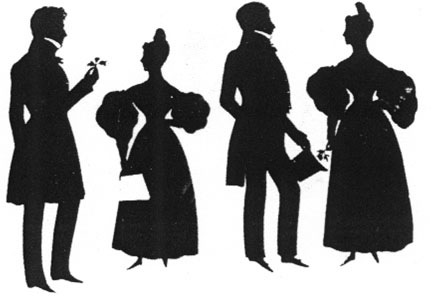
Left to right: Robert, Anne, Bent and Mary Ball

Mary Ball was born in 1812, the second daughter of Bob Stawell Ball and his wife Mary née Green. She was born near Cobh, County Cork, but shortly moved with the family to nearby Youghal, County Cork. Mary had three siblings who lived into adulthood: Robert, Bent (1806–1860), and Anne, a well-known algologist. The family was Protestant and "involved in trade".

There is not much known about Mary's training, but as a middle-class family she certainly would have access to a microscope and the latest volumes of natural history and scientific classification of the times. It has been recorded that Robert started collecting specimens with his father at the age of five. It can be assumed that Mary would have participated as well. Robert encouraged Mary in her early insect studies, purchasing for her a copy of James Stephens' Systematic Catalogue of British insects, published in 1829. In this she detailed the insects in her growing collection.

== Zoological work ==
In 1833 Mary began a correspondence with the Belfast naturalist William Thompson. Her insect collection became large for the time and was very well known. Thompson named about twenty species of molluscs and crustaceans in her honour, including a small spiral snail Rissoa balliae in 1856.

Mary concentrated on collecting shells and insects, accumulating what was considered one of the best collections of molluscs in the country at the time, though it was disposed after her death. One of her most interesting finds was a specimen of the migratory locust figured in John Curtis's British Entomology - Folio 608 Locusta christii dated 1 August 1836. "In the cabinets of Miss Ball and the author" - "Another specimen, captured last September at Ardmore in the county of Waterford by Miss M. Ball has been kindly transmitted to me for my inspection by Mr Robert Ball of Dublin. It is of the same sex as the one figured but the elytra are much more spotted".

Mary Ball's Odonata were studied by the Belgian entomologist Michel Edmond de Selys-Longchamps on his visit to Dublin. Her entomology collections are now housed in the Natural History Museum in Dublin, and the Zoology Museum in Trinity College, Dublin.

== Later life ==
After the successive deaths of her father in 1841, her mentor William Thompson in 1852 and her brother Robert in 1857, Mary seems to have given up entomology and taken to fern gardening. A success too: "If Aunt Mary had planted a parasol it would have grown into an umbrella", one of her nephews remarked. She spent her last years living with her sister Anne in Dublin. She died there in 1898 at the age of eighty-six.

== Publications ==
Mary, as was the convention, did not publish her work under her own name. The three known works were all communicated by her brother Robert. They are:

- "On the sounds produced by the Notonectidae under water" Annals and Magazine of Natural History 16: 129. (1846)
- "On the noises produced by one of the Notonectidae Report of the British Association for the Advancement of Science". Notices and abstracts of communications Cambridge Meeting, June 1845: 64–65. Ball, R. (1846).
- "Corixa striata, Curtis". Annals and Magazine of Natural History 17: 135–136. (18--)

Her observations of butterflies and moths were cited by the "father of Irish entomology" Alexander Henry Haliday in his work on the Irish Lepidoptera.
