= Bregmacerina =

Bregmacerina Temporal range: Early Miocene

Scientific classification
- Kingdom: Animalia
- Phylum: Chordata
- Class: Actinopterygii
- Order: Gadiformes
- Family: Bregmacerotidae
- Genus: †Bregmacerina; Daniltshenko, 1957
- Species: †B. antiqua

Binomial name
- †Bregmacerina antiqua (Smirnov, 1936)

Synonyms
- Motella antiqua Smirnov, 1936; Bregmacerinia (misspelling)

Extinct genus of fishes

Bregmacerina is an extinct genus of prehistoric marine ray-finned fish, most likely a codlet, that lived during the early part of the Miocene epoch. It contains a single species, B. antiqua, from the Burdigalian Sakaraul Horizon Formation of North Caucasus, Russia.

Bregmacerina inhabited the Paratethys Sea. There is some dispute as to whether it is a codlet, as while it shares traits with Bregmaceros in the reduction of the first dorsal fin, it differs in having undivided second dorsal and anal fins. However, an alternative taxonomic placement has not been suggested.

== See also ==
- Prehistoric fish
- List of prehistoric bony fish
