= James Ramsey Garrett =

James Ramsey Garrett (c. 1817 – 1855) was an Irish ornithologist.

James Garrett was a solicitor at 3 Donegall Square East Belfast. He was a leading member of the Belfast Natural History Society. Under the will of William Thompson Robert Patterson and Garrett were entrusted with the completion of Thompson's Natural History of Ireland.
