= Belfast Literary Society =

Learned society founded in 1801

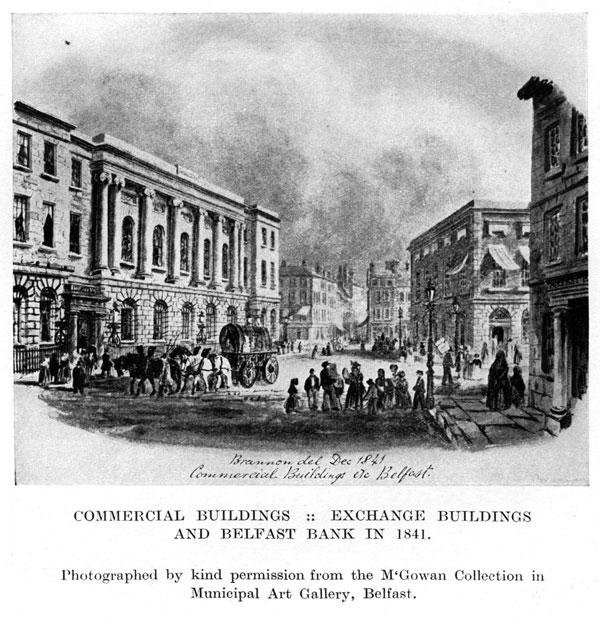
The Exchange Rooms in 1841

The Belfast Literary Society was founded in 1801, the second oldest learned society in Belfast (the Belfast Reading Society, now the Linen Hall Library, predates it by just over a decade). Its first meeting was held in the old Exchange and Assembly Rooms on the junction of Bridge, North, Waring and Rosemary Streets.

Among the twelve founding members were the Trinity-educated minister of Belfast's First Presbyterian congregation and historian, Dr. William Bruce; proprietor of the Belfast News-Letter Henry Joy; and the polymath and "father of Belfast medicine", James McDonnell. The members met "on the first Monday before each full moon" to hear and discuss papers on "literature, science of the arts".

Given the still considerable tensions within the wake of the 1798 United Irish rebellion, the society agreed to avoid political topics. But in its early years, "politics did not avoid the society". In 1803, an original member, the botanist and former United Irishman John Templeton, withdrew rather than associate Dr. MacDonnell who had signed a subscription for the capture of the unreformed rebel Thomas Russell. Russell, who had been their mutual friend, was subsequently hanged.

Among the Society's first corresponding members there was another United Irish veteran, David Bailie Warden, American consul in Paris. in 1798 Warden had led the rebels in the capture of Newtownards. However, the mutual interest was entirely scientific: an American journal Warden had kept on weather, disease, and meteorological phenomena.

William Drennan, the original instigator of the United Irishmen, refused nomination to the Society in 1807. Instead with Templeton and a radical linen merchant, John Hancock, he founded the Belfast Monthly Magazine as an alternative expression of cultural and intellectual life in the town. Bruce, who had become the principal of the town's leading school, Belfast Academy, subsequently led an unsuccessful opposition to Drennan's plans for a new, decidedly more liberal, school and college: the Belfast (later Royal Belfast) Academical Institution which opened its doors in 1814. The first paper published by the Society, by the Rev. William Richardson on a proposed species of winter hay, was pointedly dedicated to Bruce as an educator of "the youth of Belfast in the principles of religion, learning and loyalty".

As a permanent addition to the intellectual life Belfast, the Literary Society was eclipsed by the Belfast Natural History and Philosophical Society (1821) particularly after the opening in 1831 of its celebrated museum in College Square to which the Literary Society had contributed £50. For its centenary in 1901, a committee member, George Smith, prepared an "historical sketch" of its proceedings.
