= Robert Ball (naturalist) =

Irish naturalist (1802–1857)

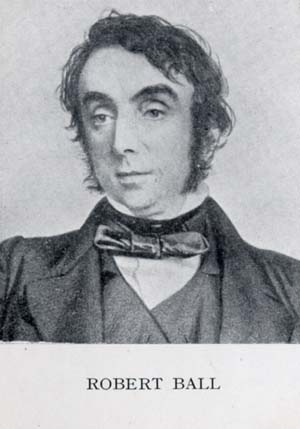
- Born: 1 April 1802; Queenstown, County Cork, Ireland
- Died: 30 March 1857 (aged 54); 3 Granby Row, Dublin
- Known for: developing "Ball's dredge"

Robert Ball (1 April 1802 – 30 March 1857) was an Irish naturalist. He served as the director of the Dublin University Museum, and developed a method of dredging known as "Ball's dredge." He served as a secretary to the Royal Zoological Society of Ireland for two decades and was responsible for popularizing natural history through public educational outreach.

== Life ==
He was born at Queenstown, County Cork. He was the third child of Bob Stawell Ball, a customs official, and Mary Ball (née Green). The Ball family lived in Youghal, County Cork. Robert had two sisters who shared his interest in nature, Anne, a well-known phycologist, and Mary, an entomologist. He also had a brother, Bent (7 March 1806 - 19 May 1860), who did not appear to pursue any interest in these fields. He initially attended a school in Clonakilty, before attending a Quaker school in Ballitore, County Kildare where his interest for natural history was developed with encouragement from his schoolmaster James White. He returned to Youghal in 1824 to take up a post as a magistrate which involved travel and was sometimes dangerous, even escaping an assassination attempt, but aided his natural history specimen collecting. He left Youghal for Dublin in 1827, and as he was unable to afford medical studies he worked for 20 years in the civil service, firstly as clerk in the Constabulary and Yeomanry Office, Dublin, and later assistant librarian and keeper of records at the same. He considered the work as "soul-subduing slavery" and pursued his natural history interests, actively associating with the local scientific circles. Ball left the civil service in 1852 with a small pension, as it was deemed he spent too much of his time on scientific pursuits than was suitable for a public servant. He went on natural history excursions with William Todhunter, William Thompson, Robert Patterson, George Hyndman, and Edward Forbes apart from travels to museums in Paris and meetings in Great Britain.

Ball then became a director of the Dublin University Museum in 1844. Later on that year he was appointed director of the museum in Trinity College. He donated his collection of 7000 bird skins to the museum. He also served as a secretary to the Royal Zoological Society of Ireland from 1837 to 1857 and was responsible for making the zoo more publicly accessible with a one-penny fee for Sunday afternoons. In 1838, Ball developed a dredge net, also known today as "Ball's dredge," to collect marine organisms.

After a career in the civil service he became director of the Dublin University Museum in 1844. He was a member of the Royal Irish Academy and president of the Royal Geological Society of Ireland.

Dublin University conferred on him the degree of LL.D. in 1850. He became secretary of the newly founded Queen's University of Ireland in 1851, and was nominated to be a Fellow of the Royal Society, however he died before he could be formally elected. On 30 March 1857 Ball died as a result of a ruptured aorta at his home at 3 Granby Row, Dublin. He is buried in Mount Jerome Cemetery and Crematorium, Dublin.

== Family ==
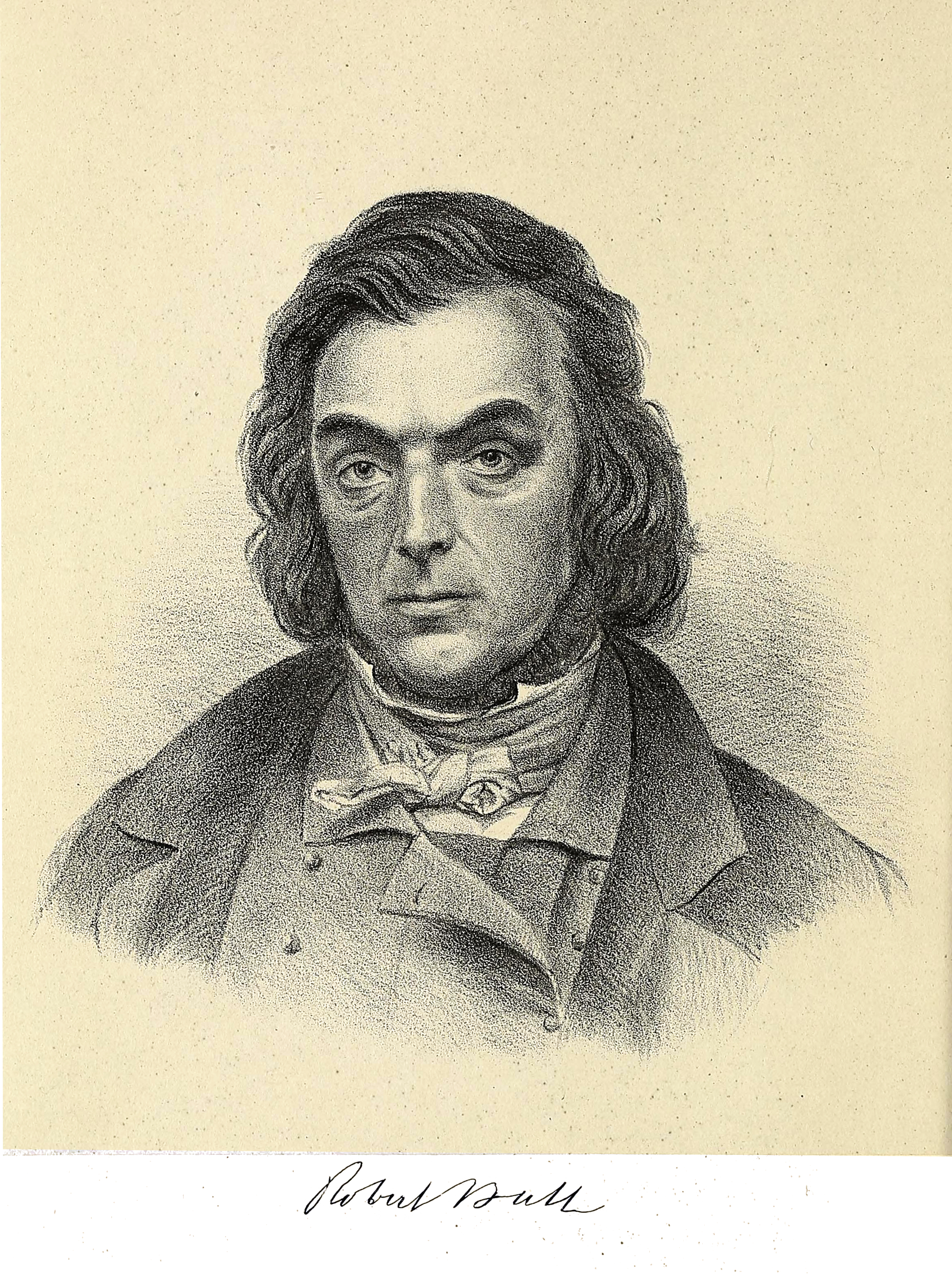
Ball in later life

On 21 September 1837 he married Amelia Gresley Hellicar, who was from Bristol. He met her at a meeting of the British Association for the Advancement of Science in Bristol the previous year. The couple had four daughters and three sons: Astronomer Royal Sir Robert Stawell Ball, Valentine Ball (1843-1895) C.B., BA, MA, LL.D., F.R.S. a geologist and naturalist, professor at Trinity College Dublin, and Sir Charles Bent Ball (1851–1916) BA, MB, M.Ch., FRCSI, a surgeon and botanist. Robert encouraged his sister Mary, gifting her with a copy of J.F. Stephens' Catalogue of British Insects in 1835.

== Works ==
Ball published just about 10 papers in all but was influential in his circle through his efforts to improve outreach and initiating public lectures, particularly at the Dublin Zoo, including many by himself. He published the work on stridulation in the Corixidae by his sister Mary, giving credit to her for the original observation. He also ensured that the collections of algae made by his sister Anne and insects by Mary went to the university museum collection.

On the museum

- (1846) First Report on the Progress of the Dublin University Museum, January 1846. Dublin.
- (1847) Second Report on the Progress of the Dublin University Museum, June 1847. Dublin.
- (1848) The Dublin University Museum, December, 1848. Dublin.
- (1853) Evidence. In Dublin University Commission, Report of Her Majesty's Commissioners appointed to inquire into the state, discipline, studies and revenues of the University of Dublin and Trinity College. Dublin. 153-169.

Scientific

- 1841. On a species of Loligo, found on the shore of Dublin Bay. Proceedings of the Royal Irish Academy, 1 (19). 362-364.
- 1842 Notes of the acetabuliferous Cephalopoda of Ireland, including two species of Rossiae. Proceedings of the Royal Irish Academy 2: 192-194.

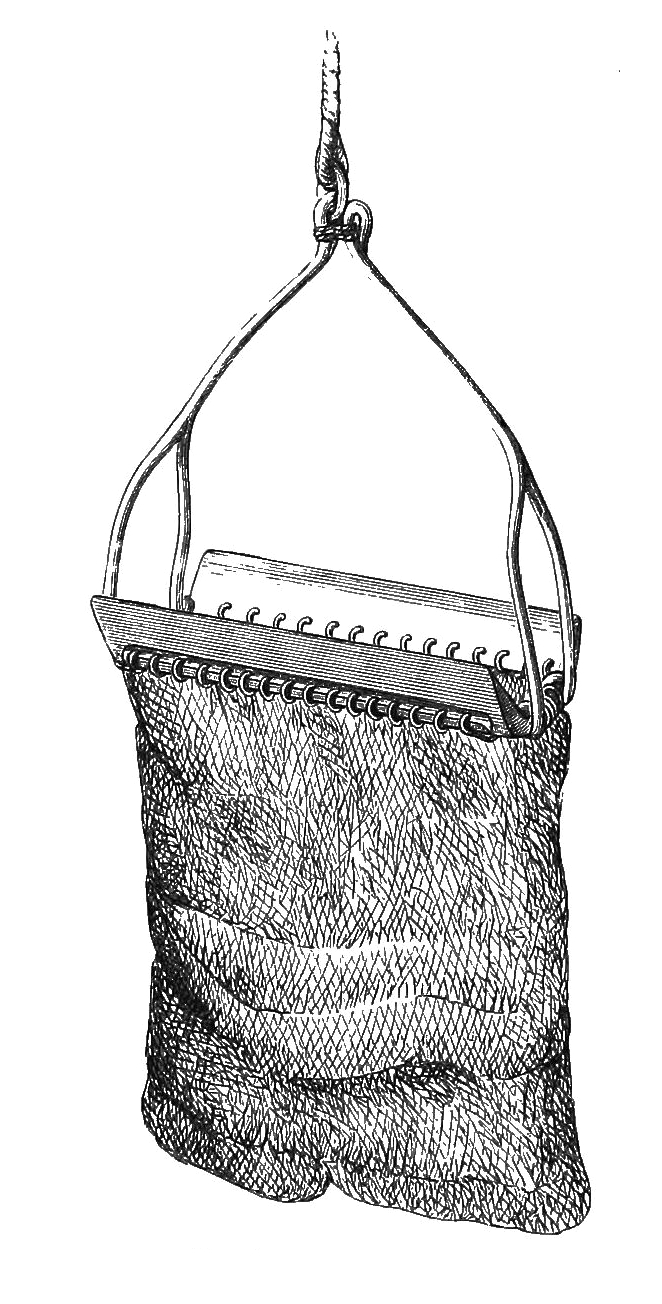
Ball's Naturalist's dredge

== Ball's dredge ==
About 1838 Robert Ball devised a dredge net to collect marine organisms. It was used all over the world, and was so apt for its purpose that it was little modified later. It is known as Ball's dredge or more generally simply "the dredge". Ball's dredge consists of a rectangular net attached to a rectangular frame much longer than high, and furnished with rods stretching from the four corners to meet at a point where they are attached to the dredge rope. It differed from the dredge net devised by Otto Friedrich Müller in the slit-like shape of the opening, which prevents much of the " washing out " suffered by the earlier pattern, and in the edges. The long edges only are fashioned as scrapers, being wider and heavier than Muller's, especially in later dredges. The short edges are of round iron bar.
