= Journal of Natural History =

- Discipline: Zoology
- Language: English
- Edited by: A. Polaszek

Publication details
- Publisher: Taylor & Francis (United Kingdom)
- Frequency: Biweekly
- Impact factor: 1.016 (2020)

Standard abbreviations
- ISO 4: J. Nat. Hist.

Indexing
- ISSN: 0022-2933 (print); 1464-5262 (web)
- LCCN: 68007383
- OCLC no.: 49668173

Links
- Journal homepage; Online access

The Journal of Natural History is a scientific journal published by Taylor & Francis focusing on entomology and zoology. The journal was established in 1841 under the name Annals and Magazine of Natural History (Ann. Mag. Nat. Hist.) and obtained its current title in 1967. The journal was formed by the merger of Loudon and Charlesworth's Magazine of Natural History (1828–1840) and the Annals of Natural History (1838–1840; previously the Magazine of Zoology and Botany, 1836–1838).

In September 1855, the Annals and Magazine of Natural History published "On the Law which has Regulated the Introduction of New Species", a paper which Alfred Russel Wallace had written while working in the state of Sarawak on the island of Borneo in February of that year. This paper gathered and enumerated general observations regarding the geographic and geologic distribution of species (biogeography). The conclusion that "Every species has come into existence coincident both in space and time with a closely allied species" has come to be known as the "Sarawak Law". The paper was hailed by Edward Blyth and shook the thinking of Charles Lyell. They both advised Charles Darwin of the paper, and though he missed its significance, Lyell's concerns about priority pressed Darwin to push ahead towards the publication of his theory of natural selection.
