= Deep-sea exploration =

Investigation of ocean conditions beyond the continental shelf

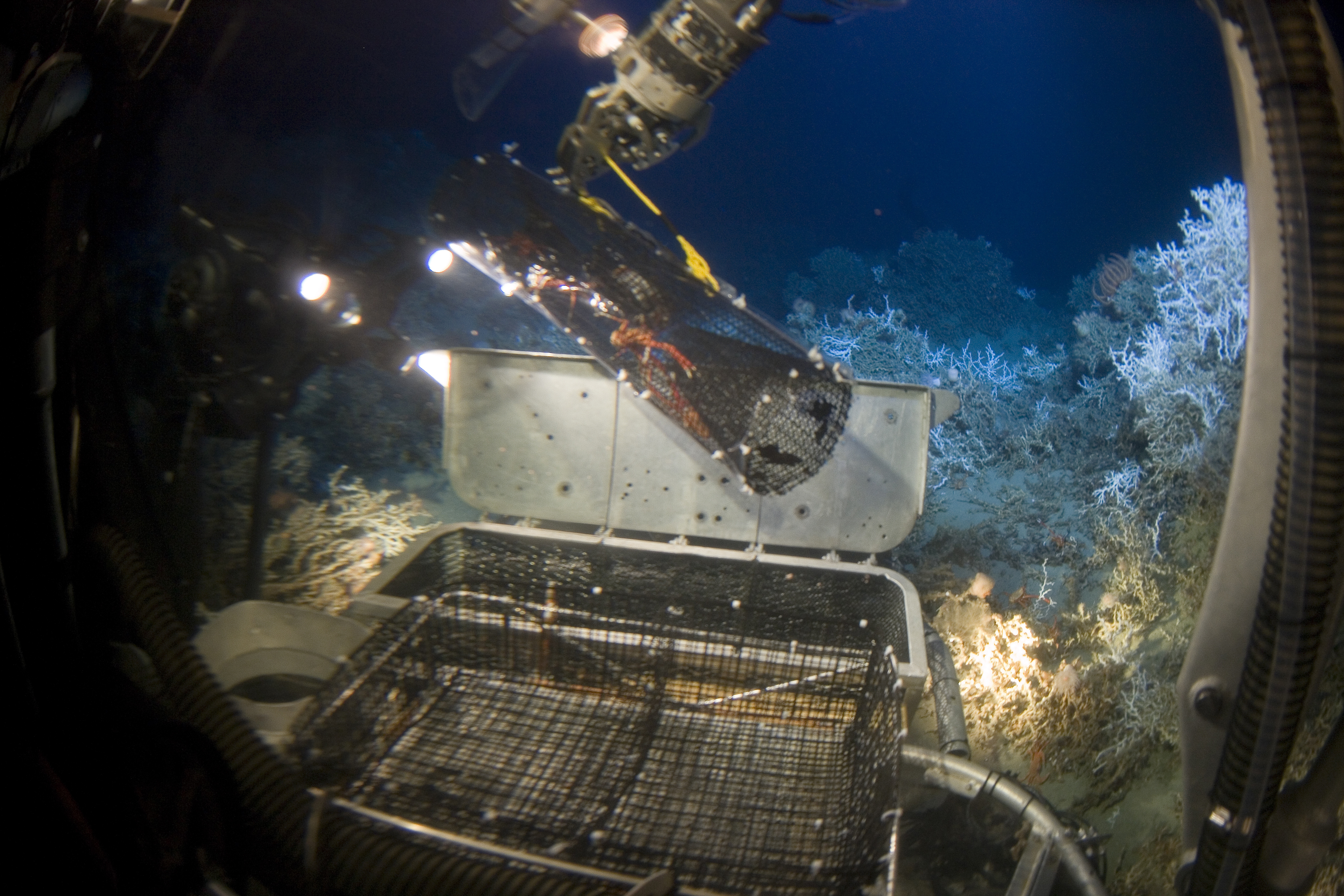
The submersible's manipulator arm collecting a crab trap containing five galatheid crabs. This is an eel trap that has been modified to better catch deep sea fauna. Life on the Edge 2005 Expedition.

Deep-sea exploration is the investigation of physical, chemical, and biological conditions in the ocean waters and sea bed beyond the continental shelf, for scientific or commercial purposes. Deep-sea exploration is an aspect of underwater exploration and is considered a relatively recent human activity compared to the other areas of geophysical research, as the deeper depths of the sea have been investigated only during comparatively recent years. The ocean depths still remain a largely unexplored part of the Earth, and form a relatively undiscovered domain.

Scientific deep-sea exploration can be said to have begun when French scientist Pierre-Simon Laplace investigated the average depth of the Atlantic Ocean by observing tidal motions registered on Brazilian and African coasts circa the late 18th or early 19th century. However, the exact date of his investigation is unknown. He calculated the depth to be 3,962 metres (12,999 ft), a value later proven quite accurate by echo-sounding measurement techniques. Later on, due to increasing demand for the installment of submarine cables, accurate measurements of the sea floor depth were required and the first investigations of the sea bottom were undertaken. The first deep-sea life forms were discovered in 1864 when Norwegian researchers Michael Sars and Georg Ossian Sars obtained a sample of a stalked crinoid at a depth of 3,109 m (10,200 ft).

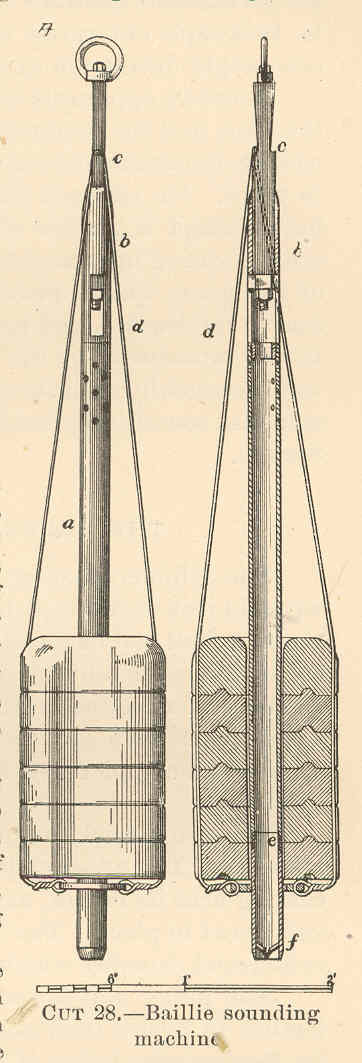
Baillie sounding machine, an early gravity core sampler used by the Challenger expedition

From 1872 to 1876, a landmark ocean study was carried out by British scientists aboard HMS Challenger, a screw corvette that was converted into a survey ship in 1872. The Challenger expedition covered 127,653 kilometres (68,927 nmi), and shipboard scientists collected hundreds of samples and hydrographic measurements, discovering more than 4,700 new species of marine life, including deep-sea organisms. They are also credited with providing the first real view of major seafloor features such as the deep ocean basins.

The first instrument used for deep-sea investigation was the sounding weight, used by British explorer Sir James Clark Ross. With this instrument, he reached a depth of 3,700 m (12,139 ft) in 1840. The Challenger expedition used similar instruments called Baillie sounding machines to extract samples from the sea bed.

In the 20th century, deep-sea exploration advanced considerably through a series of technological inventions, ranging from the sonar system, which can detect the presence of objects underwater through the use of sound, to manned deep-diving submersibles. In 1960, Jacques Piccard and United States Navy Lieutenant Donald Walsh descended in the bathyscaphe Trieste into the deepest part of the world's oceans, the Mariana Trench. On 25 March 2012, filmmaker James Cameron descended into the Mariana Trench in Deepsea Challenger, and, for the first time, filmed and sampled the bottom.

Despite these advances in deep-sea exploration, the voyage to the ocean bottom is still a challenging experience. Scientists are working to find ways to study this extreme environment from the shipboard. With more sophisticated use of fiber optics, satellites, and remote-control robots, scientists hope to, one day, explore the deep sea from a computer screen on the deck rather than out of a porthole.

== Milestones ==
The extreme conditions in the deep sea require elaborate methods and technologies to endure, which has been the main reason why its exploration has had a comparatively short history. Some important milestones of deep sea exploration are listed below:

- 1521: Ferdinand Magellan tried to measure the depth of the Pacific Ocean with a weighted line, but did not find the bottom.
- 1810–1827: Antoine Risso, an apothecary from Nice (then part of the Duchy of Savoy) published a series of papers that remained long ignored, describing and naming dozens of fish and crustaceans species collected by fishermen at depths between 600 and 1,000 m (1,969 and 3,281 ft) in the Gulf of Genoa.
- 1818: The British researcher Sir John Ross independently discovered that the deep sea is inhabited by life when catching jellyfish and worms in about 2,000 m (6,562 ft) depth with a special device.
- 1843: Edward Forbes claimed that diversity of life in the deep sea is little and decreases with increasing depth. He stated that there could be no life in waters deeper than 550 m (1,804 ft), the so-called Abyssus theory.
- 1850: Near Lofoten, Michael Sars found a rich variety of deep sea fauna in a depth of 800 m (2,625 ft), thereby refuting the Abyssus Theory.
- 1872–1876: The first systematic deep sea exploration was conducted by the Challenger expedition on board the ship HMS Challenger led by Charles Wyville Thomson. This expedition revealed that the deep sea harbours a diverse, specialized biota.
- 1890–1898: First Austrian-Hungarian deep sea expedition on board the ship SMS Pola led by Franz Steindachner in the eastern Mediterranean and the Red Sea.
- 1898–1899: First German deep sea expedition on board the ship Valdivia led by Carl Chun; found many new species from depths greater than 4,000 m (13,123 ft) in the southern Atlantic Ocean.
- 1930: William Beebe and Otis Barton were the first humans to reach the deep sea when diving in the Bathysphere, a spherical steel pressure resistant chamber. They reached a depth of 435 m (1,427 ft), where they observed jellyfish and shrimp.
- 1934: The Bathysphere reached a depth of 923 m (3,028 ft).
- 1947–1948: Swedish oceanographer Hans Petterson organised and led the Albatross expedition, which went 45,000 nautical miles (51,785 mi; 83,340 km) around the equator in 15 months. With a help of a Kullenberg piston corer the expedition for the first time brought up 20-metre-long (66 ft) sediment cores from the seafloor and performed deep-sea trawling at 7,600–7,900 m (24,934–25,919 ft) below the ocean surface.
- 1948: Otis Barton set a new record, diving to a depth of 1,370 m (4,495 ft) in the bathysphere.
- 1960: Jacques Piccard and Don Walsh reached the bottom of the Challenger Deep in the Mariana Trench, descending to a depth of 10,740 m (35,236 ft) in their deep sea vessel Trieste, where they observed fish and other deep sea organisms.
- 2012: The vessel Deepsea Challenger, piloted by James Cameron, completed the second crewed voyage and first solo mission to the bottom of the Challenger Deep.
- 2018: DSV Limiting Factor, piloted by Victor Vescovo, completed the first mission to the deepest point of the Atlantic Ocean, diving 8,375 m (27,477 ft) below the ocean surface to the base of the Puerto Rico Trench.
- 2019: DSV Limiting Factor made dives to the bottom of the South Sandwich Trench, deepest part of the Southern Ocean, the Sunda Trench in the Indian Ocean, the Horizon Deep in the Tonga Trench in the South Pacific, several dives in the Marianas Trench at Challenger Deep and Sirena Deep and in the Molloy Deep in the Arctic Ocean
- 2020: As mission specialists on board the vessel Limiting Factor Dr. Kathryn Sullivan and Vanessa O'Brien completed missions piloted by Vescovo, becoming the first women to reach the bottom of Challenger Deep at 10,925 m (35,843 ft).

== Oceanographic instrumentation ==
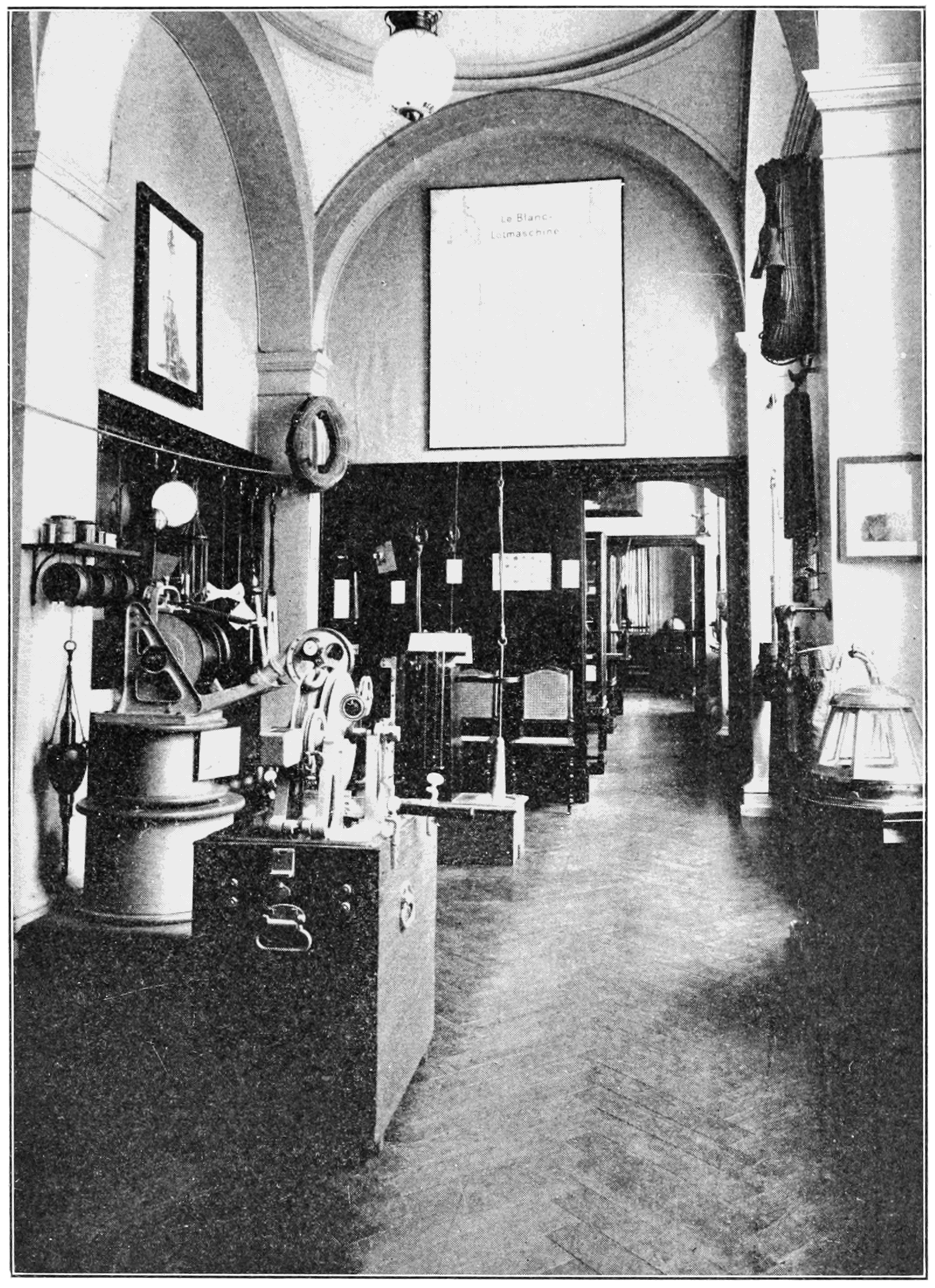
Deep sea exploration apparatus, 1910

The sounding weight, one of the first instruments used for the sea bottom investigation, was designed as a tube on the base which forced the seabed in when it hit the bottom of the ocean. British explorer Sir James Clark Ross fully employed this instrument to reach a depth of 3,700 m (12,139 ft) in 1840.

Sounding weights used on HMS Challenger were the slightly more advanced "Baillie sounding machine". The British researchers used wire-line soundings to investigate sea depths and collected hundreds of biological samples from all oceans except the Arctic. Also used on HMS Challenger were dredges and scoops, suspended on ropes, with which samples of the sediment and biological specimens of the seabed could be obtained.

A more advanced version of the sounding weight is the gravity corer. The gravity corer allows researchers to sample and study sediment layers at the bottom of oceans. The corer consists of an open-ended tube with a lead weight and a trigger mechanism that releases the corer from its suspension cable when the corer is lowered over the seabed and a small weight touches the ground. The corer falls into the seabed and penetrates it to a depth of up to 10 m (33 ft). By lifting the corer, a long, cylindrical sample is extracted in which the structure of the seabed’s layers of sediment is preserved. Recovering sediment cores allows scientists to see the presence or absence of specific fossils in the mud that may indicate climate patterns at times in the past, such as during the ice ages. Samples of deeper layers can be obtained with a corer mounted in a drill. The drilling vessel JOIDES Resolution is equipped to extract cores from depths of as much as 1,500 m (4,921 ft) below the ocean bottom. (See Ocean Drilling Program)

Echo-sounding instruments have also been widely used to determine the depth of the sea bottom since World War II. This instrument is used primarily for determining the depth of water by means of an acoustic echo. A pulse of sound sent from the ship is reflected from the sea bottom back to the ship, the interval of time between transmission and reception being proportional to the depth of the water. By registering the time lapses between outgoing and returning signals continuously on paper tape, a continuous mapping of the seabed is obtained. The majority of the ocean floor has been mapped in this way.

High-resolution video cameras, thermometers, pressure meters, and seismographs are other instruments useful for deep-sea exploration. These instruments are either lowered to the sea bottom by cables or attached to submersible buoys. Deep-sea currents can be studied by floats carrying an ultrasonic sound device so that their movements can be tracked from aboard the research vessel. These vessels are equipped with precise navigational instruments, such as satellite navigation and dynamic positioning systems that keep the vessel in a fixed position relative to a sonar beacon on the bottom of the ocean. Magnetometers were used for the first time at the Wreck of the Titanic during a 15 July 2024 expedition, in order to provide metal detection as well as recover on-site artefacts, which is a means often utilised by explorers in examining shipwrecks at such depths given their material accuracy in recognising ferromagnetic material, and are therefore often in high demand by expedition firms.

== Oceanographic submersibles ==
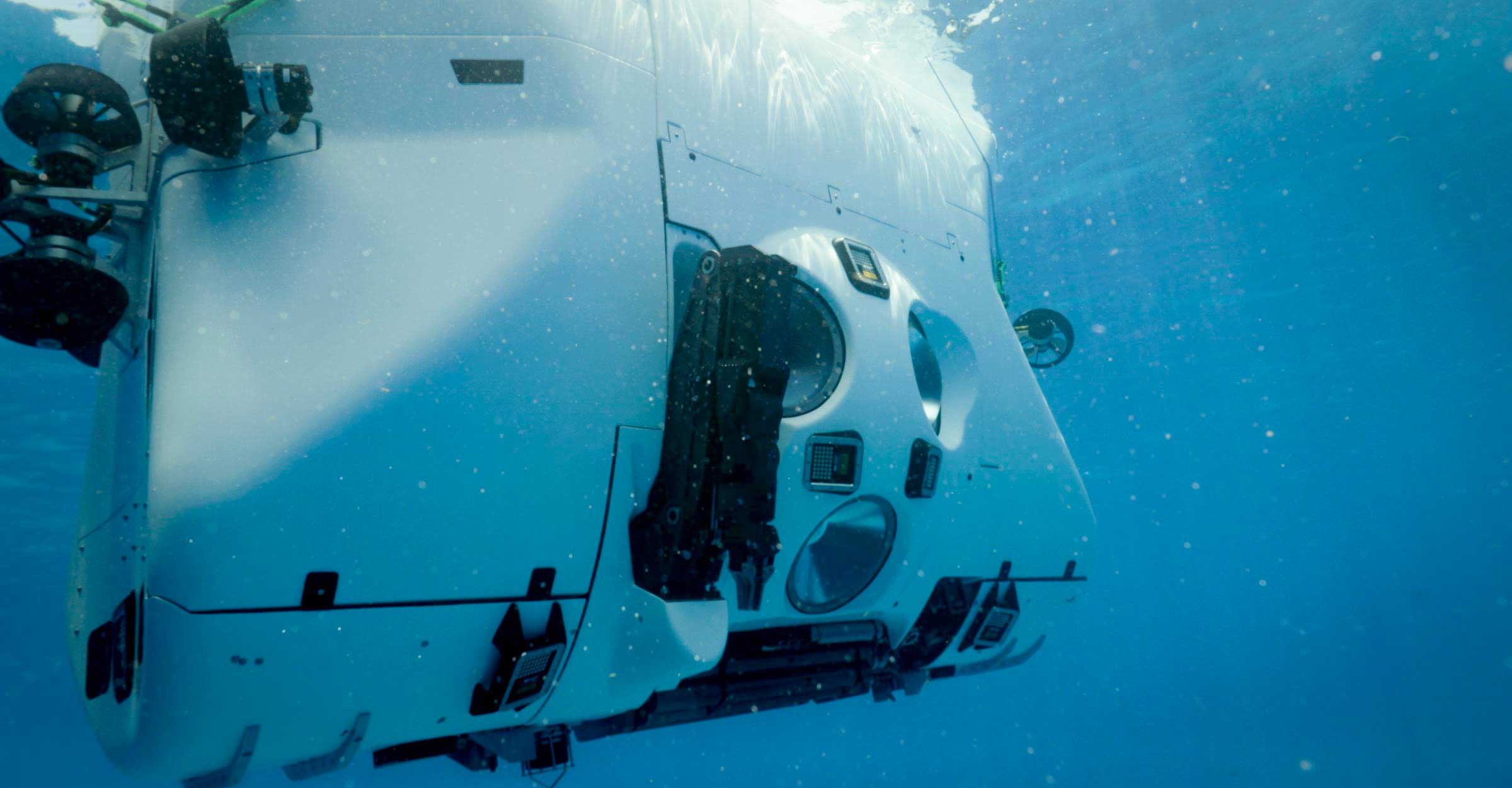
DSV Limiting Factor at the water surface

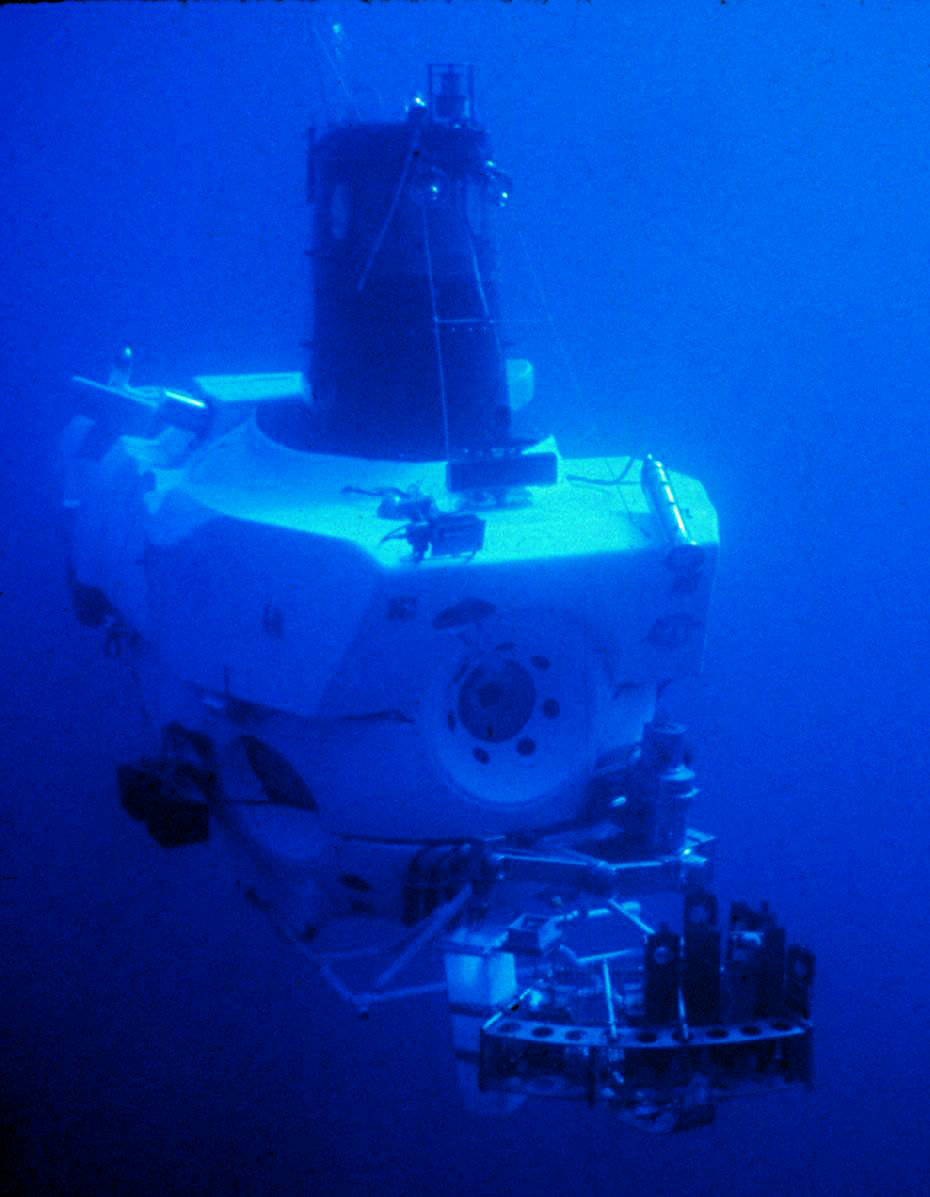
Submersible Alvin of Woods Hole Oceanographic Institution in 1978

Because of the high pressure, the depth to which a diver can descend without special equipment is limited. The deepest recorded descent made by a freediver is 253 m (830 ft) as of 2012. The scuba record is 318 m (1,043 ft) as of June 2005, and 534 metres (1,752 ft) on surface supply on the Comex Hydra 8 experimental dives in 1988.

Atmospheric diving suits isolate the diver from the ambient pressure, and allow divers to reach depths to approximately 600 m (1,969 ft). Some atmospheric suits feature thrusters that can propel the diver through the water.

To explore greater depths, deep-sea explorers must rely on specially constructed pressure resistant chambers to protect them, or explore remotely. The American explorer William Beebe, also a naturalist from Columbia University in New York, working with fellow engineer Otis Barton of Harvard University, designed the first practical bathysphere to observe marine species at depths that could not be reached by a diver. In 1930 Beebe and Barton reached a depth of 435 m (1,427 ft), and 923 m (3,028 ft) in 1934. The potential danger was that if the cable broke, the occupants could not return to the surface. During the dive, Beebe peered out of a porthole and reported his observations by telephone to Barton who was on the surface.

In 1948, Swiss physicist Auguste Piccard tested a much deeper-diving vessel he invented called the bathyscaphe, a navigable deep-sea vessel with its gasoline-filled float and suspended chamber or gondola of spherical steel. On an experimental dive in the Cape Verde Islands, his bathyscaphe successfully withstood the pressure on it at 1,402 m (4,600 ft), but its body was severely damaged by heavy waves after the dive. In 1954, with this bathyscaphe, Piccard reached a depth of 4,000 m (13,123 ft). In 1953, his son Jacques Piccard joined in building a new and improved bathyscaphe Trieste, which dived to 3,139 m (10,299 ft) in field trials. The United States Navy acquired Trieste in 1958 and equipped it with a new cabin to enable it to reach deep ocean trenches. In 1960, Jacques Piccard and United States Navy Lieutenant Donald Walsh descended in Trieste to the deepest known point on Earth - the Challenger Deep in the Mariana Trench, successfully making the deepest dive in history: 10,915 m (35,810 ft).

An increasing number of crewed submersibles are now employed around the world. For example, the American-built DSV Alvin, operated by the Woods Hole Oceanographic Institution, is a three-person submarine that can dive to about 3,600 m (11,811 ft) and is equipped with a mechanical manipulator to collect bottom samples. Alvin is designed to carry a crew of three people to depths of 4,000 m (13,123 ft). The submarine is equipped with lights, cameras, computers, and highly maneuverable robotic arms for collecting samples in the darkness of the ocean's depths. Alvin made its first test dive in 1964, and has performed more than 3,000 dives to average depths of 1,829 m (6,001 ft). Alvin has also been involved in a wide variety of research projects, such as one where giant tube worms were discovered on the Pacific Ocean floor near the Galápagos Islands.

=== Unmanned submersibles ===
Describing the operation and use of autonomous landers in deep sea research

One of the first unmanned deep sea vehicles was developed by the University of Southern California with a grant from the Allan Hancock Foundation in the early 1950s to develop a more economical method of taking photos miles under the sea with an unmanned steel high-pressure 3,000 lb (1,361 kg) sphere called a benthograph, which contained a camera and strobe light. The original benthograph built by USC was very successful in taking a series of underwater photos until it became wedged between some rocks and could not be retrieved.

Remote operated vehicles (ROVs) are also seeing increasing use in underwater exploration. These submersibles are piloted through a cable which connects to the surface ship, and can reach depths of up to 6,000 m (19,685 ft). New developments in robotics have also led to the creation of AUVs, or autonomous underwater vehicles. The robotic submarines are programmed in advance, and receive no instruction from the surface. A Hybrid ROV (HROV) combines features of both ROVs and AUV, operating independently or with a cable. Argo was used in 1985 to locate the wreck of the RMS Titanic; the smaller Jason was also used to explore the shipwreck.

=== Construction and materials ===
Deep-sea exploration vessels must operate under high external hydrostatic pressure, and most of the deep sea remains at temperatures near freezing, which may cause embrittlement of some materials. Structural geometry, material choices and construction processes are all important design factors. If the vessel is crewed, the compartments housing the occupants is almost always the limiting factor. Other parts of the vehicle such as electronics casings can be filled with lightweight yet pressure resistant syntactic foams or filled with incompressible liquids. The occupied portion, however, must remain hollow and under internal pressures suitable for humans. Since the pressures acceptable for human occupancy are so small compared to external ambient pressure at depth, the internal pressure is normally maintained at approximately surface atmospheric pressure, which simplifies the life-support systems considerably, and allows immediate egress at the surface without decompression. Unmanned vessels may have sensitive and delicate electronic equipment that must be kept dry and isolated from the external pressure. Regardless of the nature of the craft or the materials used, the pressure vessels are almost always constructed in spherical, conical, or cylindrical shapes, as these distribute the loads most efficiently to minimise stress and buckling instability.

The processing of the chosen material for constructing submersible research vehicles guides much of the rest of the construction process. For example, the Japan Agency for Marine-Earth Science and Technology (JAMSTEC) employs several Autonomous Underwater Vehicles (AUVs) with varied construction. The most commonly used metals for constructing the high-pressure vessels of these craft are wrought alloys of aluminum, steel, and titanium. Aluminum is chosen for medium-depth operations where extremely high strength is not necessary. Steel is an extremely well-understood material which can be tuned to have incredible yield strength and yield stress. It is an excellent material for resisting the extreme pressures of the sea but has a very high density that limits the size of steel pressure vessels due to weight concerns. Titanium is nearly as strong as steel and three times as light. It seems like the obvious choice to use but has several issues of its own. Firstly, it is much more costly and difficult to work with titanium, and improper processing can lead to substantial flaws. To add features such as viewports to a pressure vessel, delicate machining operations must be used, which carry a risk in titanium. The Deepsea Challenger, for example, used a sphere of steel to house its pilot. This sphere is estimated to be able to withstand 23,100 psi of hydrostatic pressure, which is roughly equivalent to an ocean depth of 52,000 feet, far deeper than Challenger Deep. Smaller titanium spheres were used to house many of the vessel’s electronics, as the smaller size lowered the risk of catastrophic failure.

Wrought metals are physically worked to create the desired shapes, and this process strengthens the metal in several ways. When wrought at colder temperatures, also known as cold working, the metal undergoes strain hardening. When wrought at high temperatures, or hot working, other effects can strengthen the metal. The elevated temperatures allow for easier working of the alloy, and the subsequent rapid decrease of the temperature by quenching locks in place the alloying elements. These elements then form precipitates, which further increase the stiffness.

== Scientific results ==
In 1974, Alvin (operated by the Woods Hole Oceanographic Institution and the Deep Sea Place Research Center), the French bathyscaphe Archimède, and the French diving saucer CYANA, assisted by support ships and Glomar Challenger, explored the great rift valley of the Mid-Atlantic Ridge, southwest of the Azores. About 5,200 photographs of the region were taken, and samples of relatively young solidified magma were found on each side of the central fissure of the rift valley, giving additional proof that the seafloor spreads at this site at a rate of about 2.5 centimetres (1.0 in) per year (see plate tectonics).

In a series of dives conducted between 1979–1980 into the Galápagos rift, off the coast of Ecuador, French, Italian, Mexican, and U.S. scientists found vents, nearly 9 m (30 ft) high and about 3.7 m (12 ft) across, discharging a mixture of hot water (up to 300 °C, 572 °F) and dissolved metals in dark, smoke-like plumes (see hydrothermal vent,). These hot springs play an important role in the formation of deposits that are enriched in copper, nickel, cadmium, chromium, and uranium.

Numerous biological samples have been collected during deep sea explorations, many of which providing findings and hypotheses new to science. For instance microbiological samples from the deep Tyrrhenian Sea collected in oceanographic campaigns of the Mediterranean Science Commission have confirmed the major contribution of marine bacteria and viruses to bathypelagic productivity and in particular the role played by autotrophic and ammonia-oxidizing Archaea in this regard.

== Deep-sea mining ==
Deep-sea exploration has gained new momentum due to increasing interest in the abundant mineral resources that are located at the depths of the ocean floor, first discovered by the exploration voyage of Challenger in 1873. Increasing interest of member states of the International Seabed Authority have led to 18 exploration contracts to be carried out in the Clarion–Clipperton fracture zone of the Pacific Ocean. The result of the exploration and associated research is the discovery of new marine species as well as microscopic microbes which may have implications towards modern medicine. Private companies have also expressed interest in these resources. Various contractors in cooperation with academic institutions have acquired 115,591 km2 of high resolution bathymetric data, 10,450 preserved biological samples for study and 3,153 line-km of seabed images helping to gain a deeper understanding of the ocean floor and its ecosystem.

== See also ==
- Census of Marine Life – 10 year international marine biological program
- NEPTUNE – Underwater ocean observatory
- Ocean Drilling Program – Marine research program between 1985–2003
