= Hayter Peak =

Mountain in Heard Island, Australia

Hayter Peak (53°1′S 73°20′E) is a peak, 565 meters (1,850 ft) high, standing 400 meters west of Mount Olsen along the back of the Laurens Peninsula and at the northwest end of Heard Island. The peak was first surveyed in 1948 by the Australian National Antarctic Research Expeditions, and named by them for Alfred J. Hayter, a warrant officer on the expedition ship HMAS Labuan (L3501).
