= Azoic hypothesis =

Superseded scientific theory

The Azoic hypothesis (sometimes referred to as the Abyssus theory) is a superseded scientific theory proposed by Edward Forbes in 1843, stating that the abundance and variety of marine life decreased with increasing depth and, by extrapolation of his own measurements, Forbes calculated that marine life would cease to exist below 300 fathoms (1,800 ft; 550 m).

== Overview ==
The theory was based upon Forbes' findings aboard HMS Beacon (1832), a survey ship to which he had been appointed naturalist by the ship's commander Captain Thomas Graves. With Forbes aboard, HMS Beacon set sail around the Aegean Sea on 17 April 1841, from Malta. It was at this point that Forbes began to take dredging samples at various depths of the ocean, he observed that samples from greater depths displayed a narrower diversity of creatures which were generally smaller in size.

Forbes reported his findings from the Aegean Sea in his 1843 report to the British Association entitled Report on the Mollusca and Radiata of the Aegean Sea. His findings were widely accepted by the scientific community and were bolstered by other scientific figures of the time. David Page (1814–1879), a respected geologist, reinforced the theory by stating that "according to experiment, water at the depth of 1000 feet is compressed 1/340th of its own bulk; and at this rate of compression we know that at great depths animal and vegetable life as known to us cannot possibly exist – the extreme depressions of seas being thus, like the extreme elevations of the land, barren and lifeless solitudes."

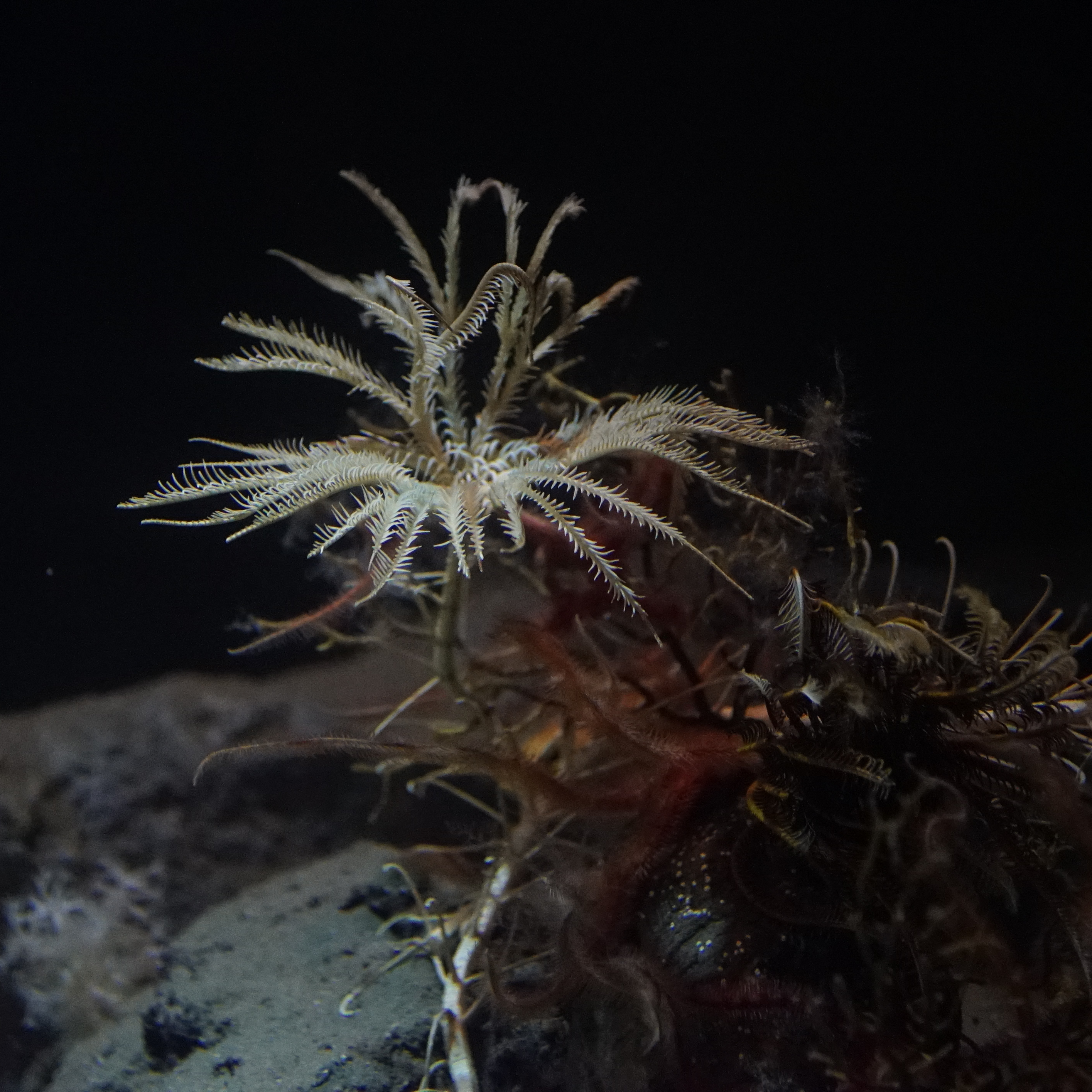
Crinoids have been found at depths of up to 4,900 fathoms (29,400 ft; 9,000 m), far deeper than the maximum depth of Forbes's theory

The theory was not disproven until the late 1860s when biologist Michael Sars, Professor of Zoology at Christiania (now Oslo) University, discovered life at a depth greater than 300 fathoms. Sars listed 427 animal species which had been found along the Norwegian coast at a depth of 450 fathoms, and gave a description of a crinoid Rhizocrinus lofotensis which his son had recovered from a depth of 300 fathoms in Lofoten. In 1869, Charles Wyville Thomson dredged marine life from a depth of 2,345 fathoms (14,070 ft; 4,289 m), finally dispelling Forbes' azoic theory.

In light of this evidence, the Azoic hypothesis would come to be seen as a false hypothesis and give way to vastly increased efforts in deep-sea exploration and associated marine life. Since being discredited, the theory has been referenced widely in popular culture and alluded to in documentaries that explore and showcase deep-sea marine life.
