= Macey Cone =

Macey Cone (52°59′S 73°15′E) is a small hill, 125 metres (410 ft) high, which marks the remnants of an extinct volcanic cone surmounting the lava cliffs at the northwest end of Laurens Peninsula, about 0.6 nautical miles (1.1 km) northeast of Cape Laurens at the northwest end of Heard Island. The feature was surveyed in 1948 by the Australian National Antarctic Research Expeditions, who named it for L.E. Macey, a senior radio operator with the expedition.
