= Gilchrist Aiguilles =

Mountain range on Heard Island

Gilchrist Aiguilles (53°1′S 73°20′E) is a series of sharp peaks close south of Mount Olsen on Laurens Peninsula, Heard Island.

Surveyed by ANARE (Australian National Antarctic Research Expeditions) in 1948. Named by Antarctic Names Committee of Australia (ANCA) for Dr. A.R. Gilchrist, ANARE medical officer on Heard Island in 1948 and 1963.
