= Mount Olsen =

Mountain on Heard Island

Mount Olsen (53°1′S 73°20′E) is a snow-covered peak (635 m) standing 0.2 nautical miles (0.4 km) east of Hayter Peak on Laurens Peninsula, in the northwest part of Heard Island.

The feature appears to have been roughly charted on an 1860 sketch map compiled by Captain H.C. Chester, an American sealer operating in the area during this period.

It was surveyed in 1948 by ANARE (Australian National Antarctic Research Expeditions), who named it after Bjarne Olsen, first mate on the whale catcher Kidalkey which visited the island in January 1929.

It is close to and north of the Gilchrist Aiguilles.
