= Thomas Graves (naturalist) =

Thomas Graves (1802 – 28 August 1856) was an officer of the Royal Navy and naturalist who worked extensively as a surveyor in the Mediterranean.

== Life ==
Admiralty Chart No 53 Lough Neagh surveyed and sounded by Lieut. Thomas Graves, Published 1835

Thomas Graves was born in Belfast in 1802 and entered the Navy in 1816. In 1827 he was promoted to lieutenant in HMS Adventure, under the command of Philip Parker King surveying in South America, including the Strait of Magellan. A survey of Lough Neagh under the Right Honourable the Lords Commissioners of the Admiralty followed and was prosecuted in 1831 to 1832. Survey work in the Mediterranean began in 1836 when as lieutenant-commander he was given charge of his own ship, HMS Mastiff. His next Mediterranean command was in 1841 on HMS Beacon. Thomas Abel Brimage Spratt was serving officer on both ships and on the Beacon he was joined by Edward Forbes and William Thompson.

Early in 1841 his friend Captain Graves, of H.M. surveying ship, the Beacon, then laid up at Malta, paid a visit to Belfast. Acting in conformity with that devotion to science by which he had been ever distinguished. Captain Graves took measures to obtain from the Admiralty, for Mr. Edward Forbes—the late (alas ! that we should have to speak of him as the late) eminent Professor of Natural History in the University of Edinburgh—the honorary appointment of Naturalist to his vessel, then about to proceed to the Aegean. A survey of the Island of Candia was at that time in contemplation. On his arrival in Belfast, Captain Graves kindly invited Mr. Thompson to join the party, and succeeded in inducing him to do so, as a most welcome guest.

Forbes converted every one on board, officers and men alike, into ardent naturalists. They dredged successfully at a greater depth (230 fathoms) than anyone had done before and Forbes later defined, in the Aegean, eight zones of depth characterised by peculiar assemblages of animals. Graves was also interested in ancient ruins, and some of the (more than a hundred) charts that resulted from his surveys were notable for showing illustrations of historic sites, some of which no longer exist. In 1849 he published a description of the Island of Skyros, based on his survey work.

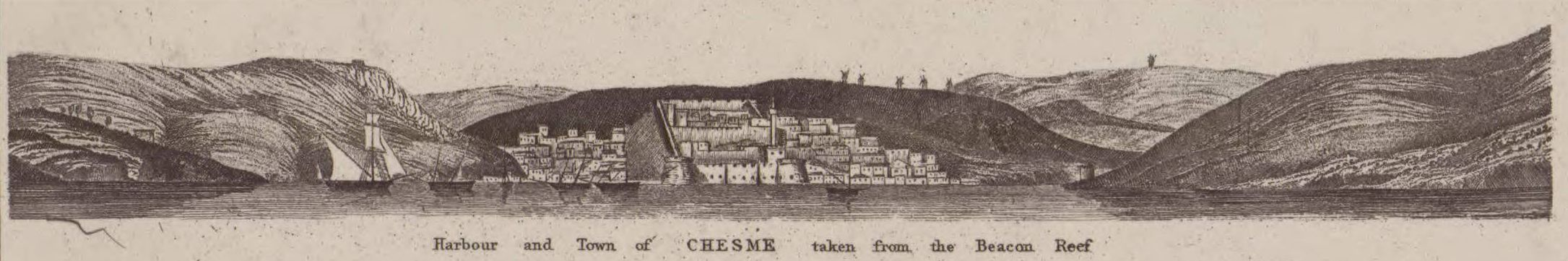

A view of the Harbour and Town of Çeşme, Turkey, Surveyed by Graves in 1837 (from Admiralty Chart No 1635)

After some months of surveying and dredging amongst the Isles of Greece, the Beacon was ordered to the coast of Lycia for the purpose of conveying to England the carved marbles and inscriptions found in the ruins of Xanthus by Sir Charles Fellows.

His next tour of duty was as captain of HMS Ceylon between 1846 and 1847, where he became reacquainted with Robert Templeton and then he returned to the Mediterranean as captain of HMS Volage. In 1853 he was made Superintendent of Ports at Malta. Graves died in Malta on 28 August 1856, from a wound inflicted by a Maltese boatman. The boatman, Giuseppe Meli, was later tried for Graves's murder, and convicted on the lesser charge of "wilful severe bodily harm".

== Species named to honour Graves ==
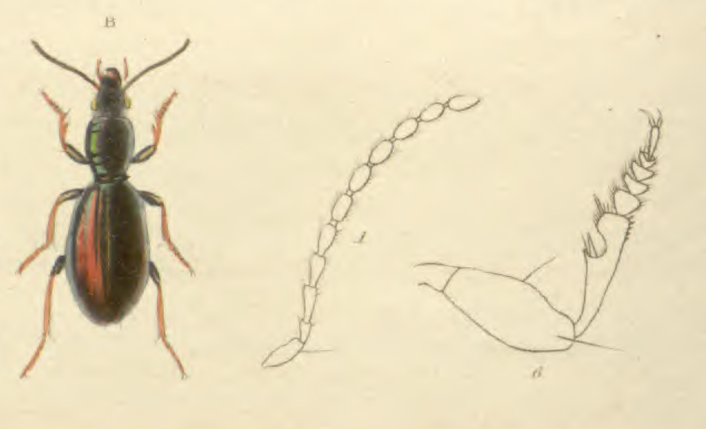
Cascellius gravesi, a beetle from P.P. King's survey of the Straits of Magellan

- Pompilus gravesi, in the order Hymenoptera, described by Alexander Henry Haliday.
- Trochus gravesi, a sea snail, a synonym for Jujubinus striatus.
- Cascellius gravesi, a Beetle (Order: Coleoptera), named by John Curtis

== Societies ==
Thomas Graves R.N. was a Member of the Belfast Natural History Society and an Associate Royal Geographical Society.

== See also ==
- O'Byrne, William Richard (1849). "Graves, Thomas" . A Naval Biographical Dictionary. Vol. 8.6. London: John Murray. p. 424.
