= Cape Laurens =

Cape on Heard Island in the Indian Ocean

Cape Laurens (52°59′S 73°15′E) is a cape which marks the northwestern extremity of Laurens Peninsula and Heard Island. The name was probably applied by Captain Franklin F. Smith, of the American bark Laurens, who visited Heard Island in 1855–56 and who, with Captain Erasmus Darwin Rogers, initiated sealing operations and longtime American sealer occupation of Heard Island. The name appears on a chart by the British expedition under George Nares, which visited the island in HMS Challenger in 1874 and utilized the names then in use by the sealers.
