= David Forbes (mineralogist) =

Manx mineralogist, metallurgist, and chemist

David Forbes FRS (6 September 1828 – 5 December 1876) was a Manx mineralogist, metallurgist, and chemist.

== Life ==
Forbes was born in Douglas, Isle of Man, the brother of Edward Forbes, and received his early education there and at Brentwood in Essex. When he was fourteen he had already acquired a knowledge of chemistry. This subject he studied at the University of Edinburgh, and he was still young when he was appointed superintendent of the mining and metallurgical works at Espedal in Norway. Subsequently, he became a partner in the firm of Evans & Askin, nickel-smelters, of Birmingham, and in that capacity during the years 1857-1860 he visited Chile, Bolivia and Peru. Besides reports for the Iron and Steel Institute, of which, during the last years of his life, he was foreign secretary, he wrote upwards of 50 papers on scientific subjects, among which are the following: The Action of Sulphurets on Metallic Silicates at High Temperatures; The Relations of the Silurian and Metamorphic Rocks of the south of Norway; The Causes producing Foliation in Rocks; The Chemical Composition of the Silurian and Cambrian Limestones; The Geology of Bolivia and Southern Peru and The Mineralogy of Chile.

His observations on the geology of South America were given in a masterly essay, and these and subsequent researches threw much light on igneous and metamorphic phenomena and on the resulting changes in rock formations. He also contributed important articles on chemical geology to the Chemical News and Geological Magazine (1867 and 1868). In England he was a pioneer in microscopic petrology. He was elected F.R.S. in 1858. He died in London and is buried in Kensal Green Cemetery, London.

His collection of books and mineralogical specimens were bought by Owens College, Manchester: the books have remained in the library (now the John Rylands University Library) and the specimens in the Manchester Museum.
