= Edward Forbes =

Manx naturalist (1815–1854)

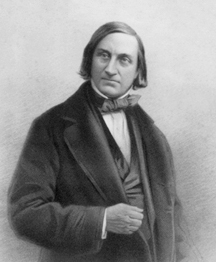
- Born: 12 February 1815; Douglas, Isle of Man
- Died: 18 November 1854 (aged 39); Wardie, Edinburgh
- Education: University of Edinburgh
- Known for: Azoic hypothesis
- Scientific career
- Fields: Natural history
- Workplaces: Geological Society of London; King's College London; Geological Survey of Great Britain; Royal School of Mines; University of Edinburgh
- Author abbrev. (botany): E.Forbes
- Author abbrev. (zoology): Forbes

Edward Forbes FRS, FGS (12 February 1815 – 18 November 1854) was a Manx naturalist. In 1846, he proposed that the distributions of montane plants and animals had been compressed downslope, and some oceanic islands connected to the mainland, during the recent ice age. This mechanism, which was the first natural explanation to explain the distributions of the same species on now-isolated islands and mountain tops, was discovered independently by Charles Darwin, who credited Forbes with the idea. He also incorrectly deduced the so-called azoic hypothesis, that life under the sea would decline to the point that no life forms could exist below a certain depth.

== Early years ==
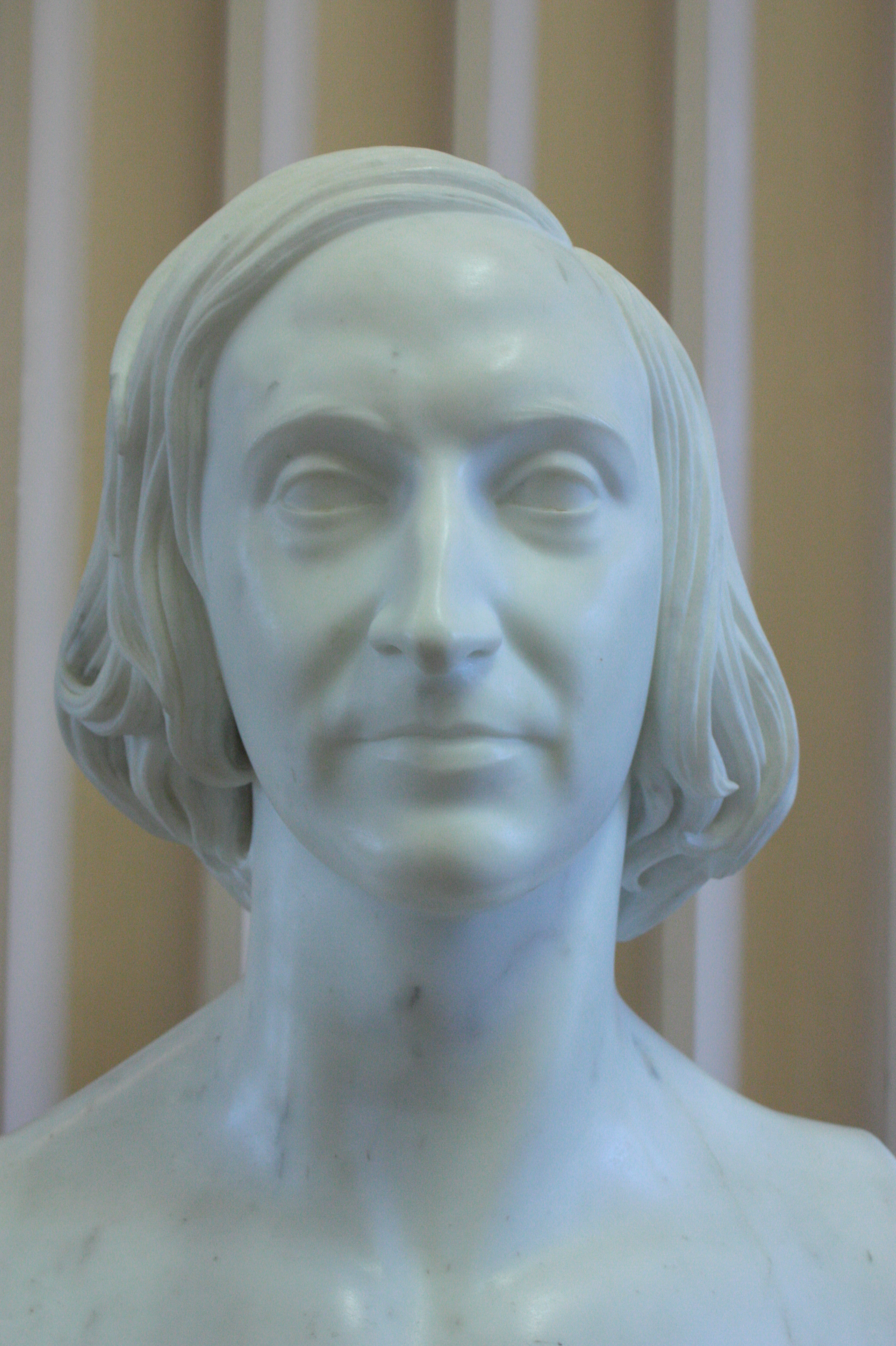
Bust of Edward Forbes by Sir John Steell

Forbes was born at Douglas in the Isle of Man. His father, Edward Forbes Snr., was a well-to-do banker who established Forbes Bank from the banking firm of Wulff and Forbes which opened in 1826. The bank's premises were situated on the site of where Douglas Railway Station now stands.

As a child, Forbes was very interested in collecting insects, shells, minerals, fossils, and plants. Due to poor health, he was unable to attend school from his 5th through his 11th years. In 1828, he started attending the Athole House Academy in Douglas.

In June 1831, Forbes moved to London to study drawing but was not admitted by the Royal Academy. However, having given up on art as a profession, he trained privately and moved back to Douglas. In later years, Forbes used his artistic abilities to create humorous drawings for his publications.

In November 1832, Forbes matriculated as a medical student in the University of Edinburgh attending the lectures of Robert Jameson and Robert Knox while also being active in student societies. In 1832, he studied the natural history of the Isle of Man. Forbes's brother David was a notable mineralogist.

== Travels ==
In 1833, Forbes travelled to Norway to study its botanical resources. His findings were published in Loudon's Magazine of Natural History for 1835–1836. The British Association funded his studies based on dredging in the Irish Sea for biological specimens. In 1835, he travelled in France, Switzerland and Germany to study their natural histories.

In 1836, Forbes abandoned his medical studies and moved to Paris, where he attended the lectures at the Jardin des Plantes on natural history, comparative anatomy, geology and mineralogy. In April 1837, Forbes traveled to Algiers to gather material for a paper on land and freshwater Mollusca. The paper was published in the Annals of Natural History, vol. ii. p. 250. He remained in Edinburgh, paid for by his father.

In 1838, Forbes published his first volume, Malacologia Monensis, a synopsis of the mollusk species native to the Isle of Man. During the summer of 1838 he visited the Duchy of Styria (now part of Austria and Slovenia) and Carniola in Slovenia to gather botanical specimens.

== Scholarly years ==
=== Marine biology ===
In 1838, Forbes presented a paper to the British Association at Newcastle on the distribution of terrestrial Pulmonata in Europe. He was then commissioned to prepare a survey on pulmonata in the British Isles. In 1841, Forbes published his History of British star-fishes, embodying extensive observations and containing 120 illustrations, all designed by Forbes.

On 17 April 1841, Forbes and naturalist William Thompson, joined at Malta HM surveying ship Beacon, to which he had been appointed naturalist by her commander Captain Thomas Graves (1802–1856). From April 1841 until October 1842, Forbes investigated the botany, zoology and geology of the Mediterranean region.

In 1843, Forbes presented a Report on the Mollusca and Radiata of the Aegean Sea, to the British Association. In the report, he discussed the influence of climate and of the nature and depth of the sea bottom upon marine life. He divided the Aegean region into eight biological zones. In his azoic hypothesis, Forbes stated that the sea regions below 300 fathom were entirely devoid of life. This hypothesis was disproved 25 years later.

In 1847, Forbes published Travels in Lycia with Lieut. T. A. B. Spratt. In 1848, he published his monograph on jellyfish, the British Naked-eyed Medusae (Ray Society).

In 1852, Forbes published the fourth and concluding volume of Forbes and S. Hanley's History of British Mollusca He also published his Monograph of the Echinodermata of the British Tertiaries (Palaeontographical Soc.).

=== Posts in London ===
In 1842, financial pressures forced Forbes to take the curatorship of the museum of the Geological Society of London. In 1843, he also became a professor botany at King's College London.

In November 1844, Forbes resigned the curatorship and became palaeontologist to the Geological Survey of Great Britain. Trilobite leading authority John William Salter was appointed on the staff of the Geological Survey and worked under Edward Forbes until 1854. Salter replaced Forbes as palaeontologist to the survey and gave his chief attention to the Palaeozoic fossils, spending much time in Wales and the border counties.

On 26 August 1848, Forbes married Emily Marianne Ashworth, the daughter of General Sir Charles Ashworth.

=== Botanical studies ===
In 1846, Forbes published in the Memoirs of the Geological Survey his important essay On the Connection between the distribution of the existing Fauna and Flora of the British Isles, and the Geological Changes which have affected their Area, especially during the epoch of the Northern Drift.

In this essay, Forbes divided the plants of Great Britain into five geographic groups and compared them to other regions in Europe:

- The West and Southwest Irish group, related to flora from Northern Spain
- The Southeast Irish and Southwest English group, related to flora of the Channel Islands and nearby coastal France
- The Southeast English group, characterized by species from the Northern French coast
- The mountain summits group, related to Scandinavian flora
- A general or Germanic flora group

Forbes theorized that the majority of British terrestrial animals and flowering plants migrated there over land bridges before, during and after the ice age. His theory was later discredited. (see C Reid's Origin of the British Flora, 1899).

In 1851 Forbes was professor of natural history to the Royal School of Mines.

In 1852 Forbes submitted an abstract to the 22nd Meeting of the British Association for the Advancement of Science in Belfast. He described the fossil plant Cyclopteris hyberinca, now Archaeopteris hybernica (E.Forbs) Stur. This is the type species of the genus Archaeopteris (Dawson) Sturr. The genus is often incorrectly attributed to John William Dawson (1871), but correctly attributed to Dionýs Štúr (1875).

=== T. H. Huxley ===
Forbes served as an important mentor to the young biologist Thomas Henry Huxley. During Huxley's 1846 to 1850 voyage on HMS Rattlesnake to Northern Australia, Huxley relayed news of his discoveries back to Forbes in the United Kingdom, who then published them.

Forbes provided Huxley with introductions to influential people, wrote a favorable review of Huxley's work, and helped his admission to the Royal Society (FRS) at age 26.

=== Illustrations ===
Forbes's scientific illustrations have been said to be anthropomorphic, often just hiding a human form even when depicting an invertebrate.

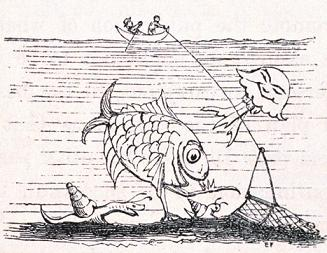
Frontispiece to Forbes's Natural History of the European Seas (Forbes's initials are in the lower right of this cartoon depicting deep sea dredging for marine fauna)

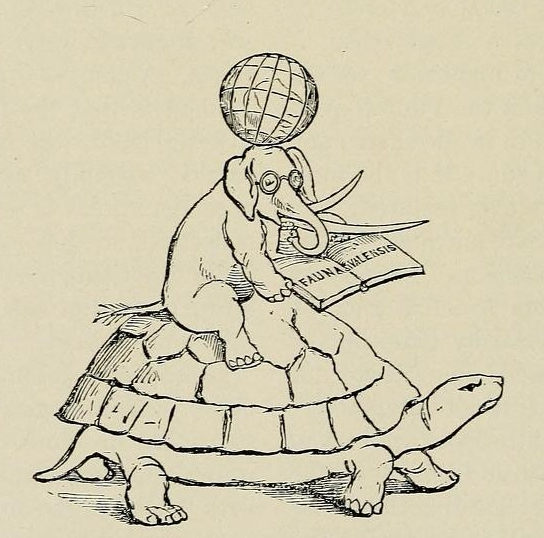
Indian cosmogony and Fauna Sivalensis, cartoon by Forbes in the notebook of Hugh Falconer

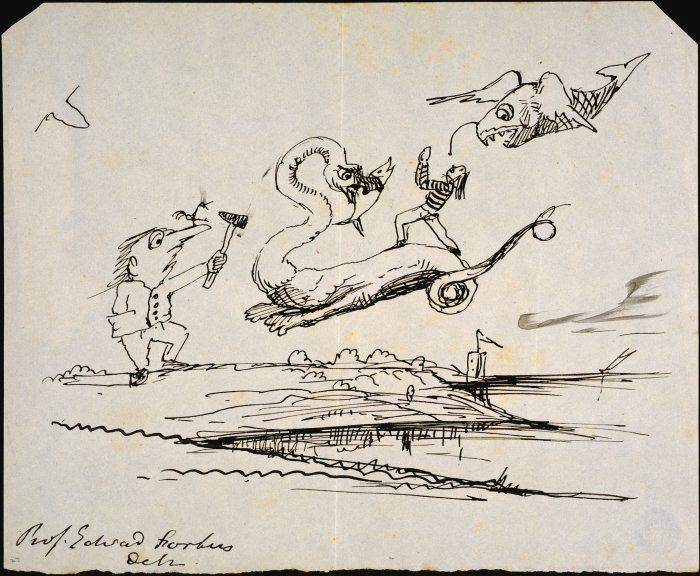
Drawing by Forbes of geologist Gideon Mantell engaged in battle with flying dinosaurs on the English coastline, c. 1830s

== Final years ==
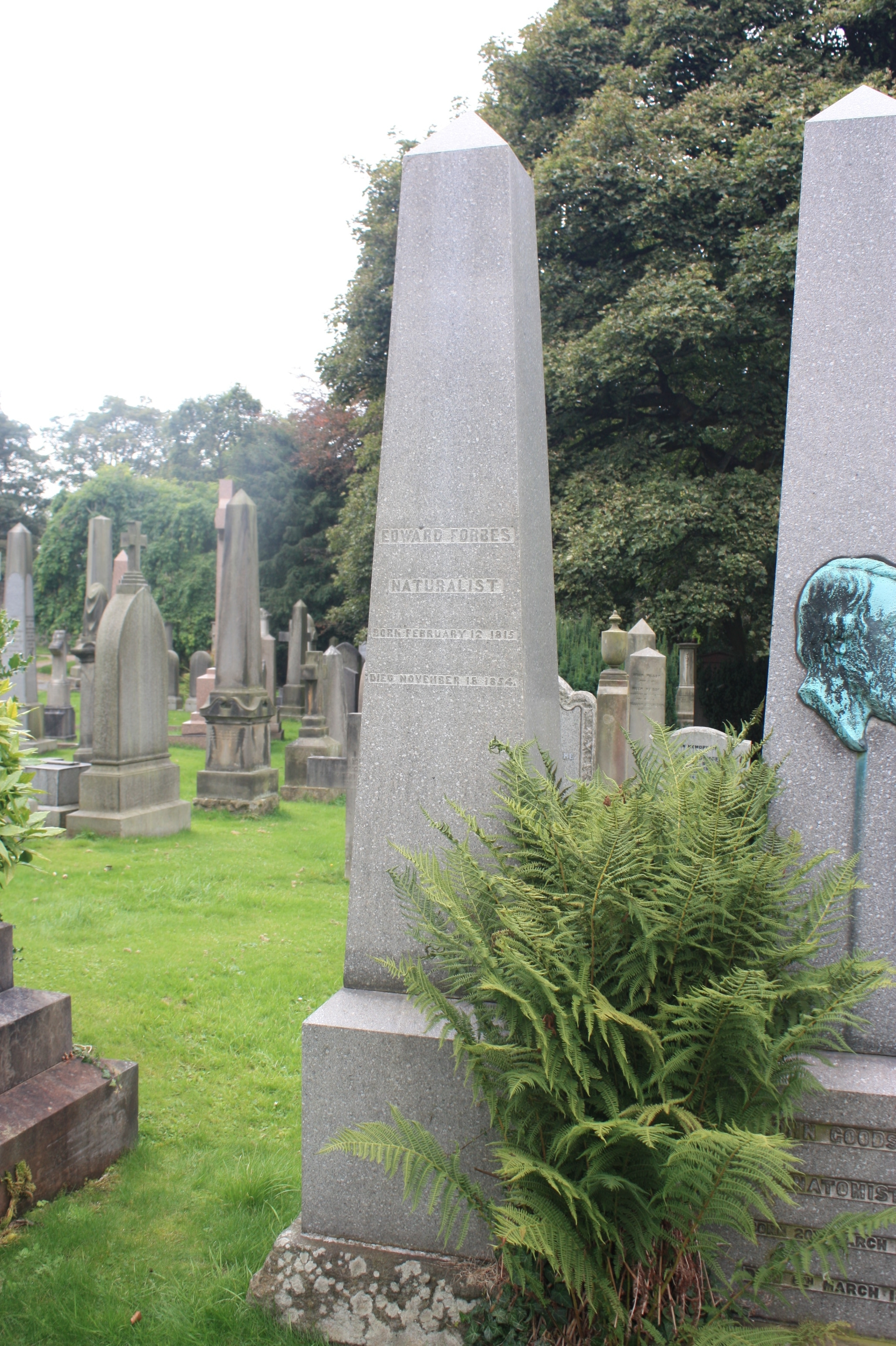
Edward Forbes's grave in Dean Cemetery in Edinburgh

In 1853 Forbes became president of the Geological Society of London. In 1854, he was appointed professor of natural history at the University of Edinburgh, a long sought goal. During his later years, Forbes found more time in between lecturing and writing to order his stores of biological information.

In the summer of 1854, Forbes lectured at Edinburgh and in September served as president of the geological section at the Liverpool meeting of the British Science Association. He served briefly as Professor of Natural History in succession to Prof Robert Jameson.

In November 1854, soon after the start of winter classes at Edinburgh, Forbes became ill. He died at Wardie Parish, near Edinburgh, on 18 November 1854. He was interred at the Dean Cemetery in Edinburgh.

In 1859, a former student of Forbes; James Hector dedicated Mount Forbes in what is now Banff National Park in Alberta, Canada to his memory.

The following Forbes works were issued posthumously:

- On the Tertiary Fluviomarine Formation of the Isle of Wight (Geol. Survey), edited by RAC Godwin-Austen (1856)
- The Natural History of the European Seas, edited and continued by RAC Godwin-Austen (1859).

Forbes's widow provided papers to George Wilson to write up the memoirs of Forbes. Wilson however died in 1859 and his sister then passed on the papers to Archibald Geikie who had met Forbes only twice. Forbes's widow married Major Yelverton in 1858 and forbade Geikie to work on the memoirs, seeking back all the papers. Forbes's brother however wished that Geikie finish the book as did the publisher Alexander Macmillan. In 1860, it was found that Yelverton had earlier married Maria Teresa Longworth and the separation had not been made with a witness. Yelverton was accused of bigamy and Teresa Longworth wrote about her plight in a book Martyrs to Circumstance. Mrs Forbes had two sons by Yelverton and with the case being in the limelight, she had no time to apply pressure on Geikie. Geikie however had to exercise considerable diplomacy while writing the biography as Forbes had claimed that he had been sufficiently remunerated by the School of Mines.

== See also ==
- European and American voyages of scientific exploration
- "The New Museum Idea"
