= Underwater exploration =

Investigating or traveling around underwater for the purpose of discovery

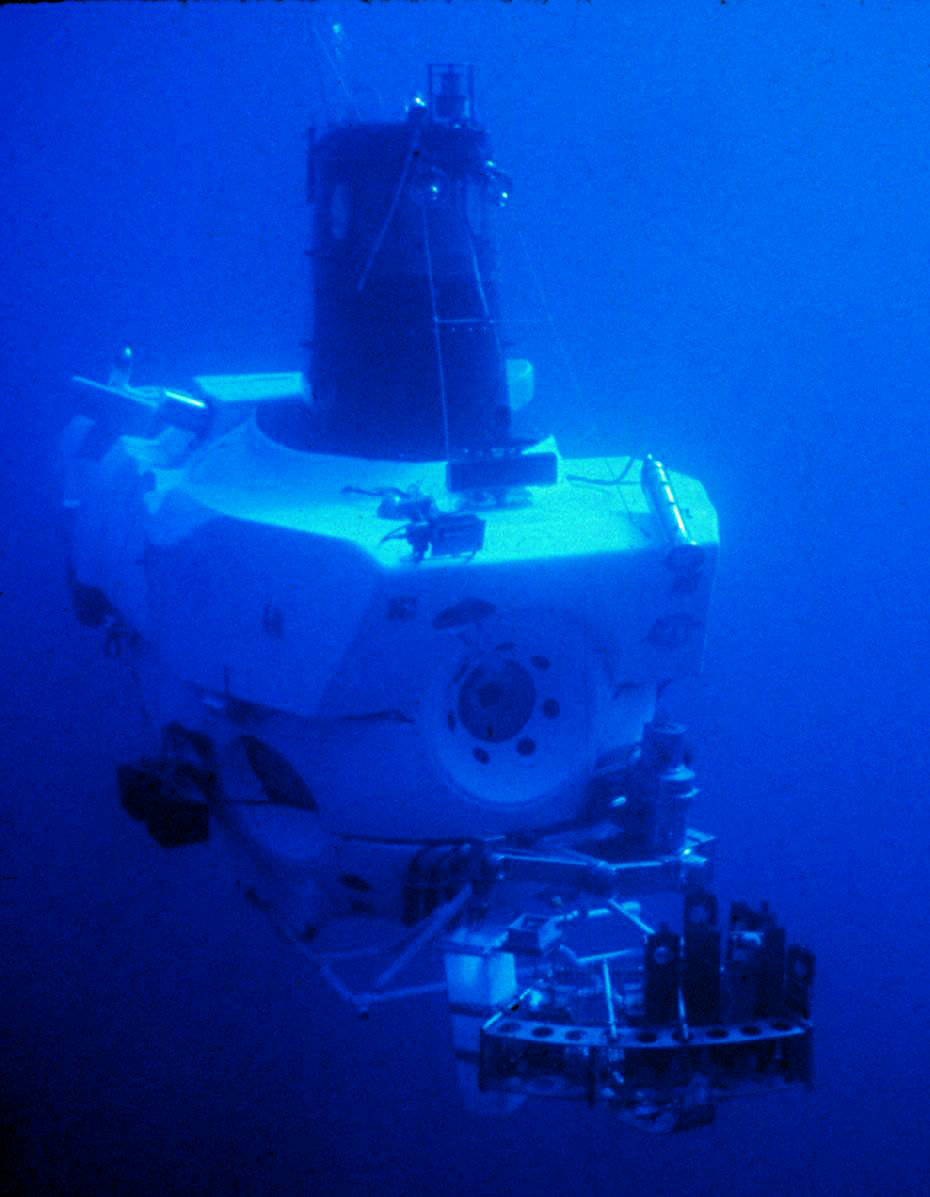
DSV Alvin, a crewed submersible, much used for underwater exploration

Underwater exploration is the exploration of any underwater environment, either by direct observation by the explorer, or by remote observation and measurement under the direction of the investigators. Systematic, targeted exploration is the most effective method to increase understanding of the ocean and other underwater regions, so they can be effectively managed, conserved, regulated, and their resources discovered, accessed, and used. Less than 10% of the ocean has been mapped in any detail, less has been visually observed, and the total diversity of life and distribution of populations is similarly obscure.

Types of exploration include investigation of the form and extent of the body of water or part thereof, investigation of the geological characteristics of the seabed and freshwater equivalents, and investigation of the geological structure, strata, and sediments underlying the body of water, investigation of the physical and ecological characteristics of the body of water and its containing geographical features, discovery and investigation of shipwrecks and archeological sites, and direct and remote visual observation of what is there.

The oceans can be divided into deep ocean and coastal waters. Inland waters are mostly fresh, and consist of rivers, lakes and ground water, some of which is in accessible caves.

Underwater exploration is largely a recent development, as it relies heavily on fairly advanced technology over almost all of the relevant territory.

== Scope ==
Exploration is the process of exploring, which has been defined as (amongst other possible meanings):

- To examine or investigate something systematically.
- To travel somewhere in search of discovery.
- To (seek) experience first hand.
- To wander without any particular aim or purpose.

According to the definition. this does not necessarily require the explorer to be present at the point of investigation, so exploration of the underwater environment by remotely operated equipment, remote measurement, and autonomous devices programmed to explore the underwater environment is included. Surveys of the underwater environment, particularly geographical surveys, are also considered to be underwater exploration in a broad sense, as they are a form of systematic investigation for information not yet known in the desired detail.

Systematic investigation is the realm of science, both professional and amateur, particularly when findings are published in some way for the benefit of the wider community. Some results of systematic exploration are kept hidden from the general public for commercial and political reasons.

To travel in search of discovery is a luxury that most people and organisations cannot afford. This form of exploration is largely the domain of the wealthy and the dedicated. When financial backing occurs, the investigations tend to become systematic and targeted.

To seek experience first hand and to wander without any particular aim or purpose is recreation, and the discoveries from this aspect of exploration are likely to be personal, limited, and repetitive, as various people explore the same environment at different times. Discovery by this route tends to be published only when something obviously unusual is found, and is likely to be published as news.

== Objectives ==
The scope of underwater exploration includes the distribution and variety of marine and aquatic life, measurement of the geographical distribution of the chemical and physical properties, including movement of the water, and the geophysical, geological and topographical features of the Earth's crust where it is covered by water.

Systematic, targeted exploration is the most effective method to increase understanding of the ocean and other underwater regions, so they can be effectively managed, conserved, regulated, and their resources discovered, accessed, and used. The ocean covers approximately 70% of Earth's surface and has a critical role in supporting life on the planet but knowledge and understanding of the ocean remains limited due to difficulty and cost of access.

The distinction between exploration, survey, and other research is somewhat blurred, and one way of looking at it is to consider the baseline surveys and research as exploration, as previously unknown information is gathered. Updating and refining the data is less exploratory in nature, but may still be exploration for the people involved, in the sense that the experience is new to them.

== Status ==
=== Oceans ===
According to NOAA, as of January 2023: "More than eighty percent of our ocean is unmapped, unobserved, and unexplored." Less than 10% of the ocean, including about 35% of the ocean and coastal waters of the United States, have been mapped in any detail using sonar technology. According to GEBCO 2019 data, less than 18% of the deep ocean bed has been mapped using direct measurement and about 50% of coastal waters were not yet surveyed.

Most of the data used to create seabed maps are approximate depths derived from satellite gravity measurements and sea surface heights which are affected by the shape and mass distribution of the seabed. This method of approximation only provides low resolution information on large topographical features, and can miss significant features.

=== Subterranean waters ===
The extent of flooded caves is largely known as a result of underwater exploration and survey of those caves by divers. ROV and AUV technology is starting to be used in larger and deeper caves. Data collected is often shared and may be stored on databases to help optimise the effectiveness of such surveys, and make the information generally available.

Underwater cave mapping is complicated by a lack of access to the surface for GPS positions, darkness, with short line-of-sight, and limited visibility, which complicate optical measurement. The usual methods for survey and mapping of underwater caves are dead reckoning and direct measurements of distance, compass direction and depth, by scuba divers. Hand-held sonar may be used for distance measurement where available.

== Types of underwater exploration ==
- Investigation of the form and extent of the body of water or part thereof. (oceanography)
  - Remote acoustic and satellite sensing, radar altimeters
  - Sonar, high resolution with multibeam
  - Direct measurement by divers of cave and reef structure using depth gauge, compass, clinometer and surveyor's tape, hand held sonar, and other instruments where applicable.
- Investigation of the geological characteristics of the seabed and freshwater equivalents, and through-ground investigation of the geological structure, strata, and sediments.
- Investigation of the physical and ecological characteristics of the body of water and its containing geographical features.
  - Identification and recording of numbers and distribution of biological specimens
  - Collection of biological samples by divers, grabs, nets, dredges, manned and unmanned submersibles
  - Infra-red and microwave radiometers for sea surface temperature measurement
  - Bottom sampling: Grabs, dredges, gravity core sampler, piston corer, hydraulic piston corer core drill
  - Measurement and recording of the physical and chemical characteristics if the water
- Discovery and investigation of shipwrecks and archeological sites
  - Magnetometer, multibeam sonar
- Direct and remote visual observation
  - Divers and crewed observation submersibles, remotely operated underwater vehicles and autonomous underwater vehicles, video and still photography.

== Regions of the underwater environment ==
The oceans can be divided into deep ocean and coastal waters. Inland waters are mostly fresh, and consist of rivers, lakes and ground water, some of which is in accessible caves.

=== Deep-sea ===
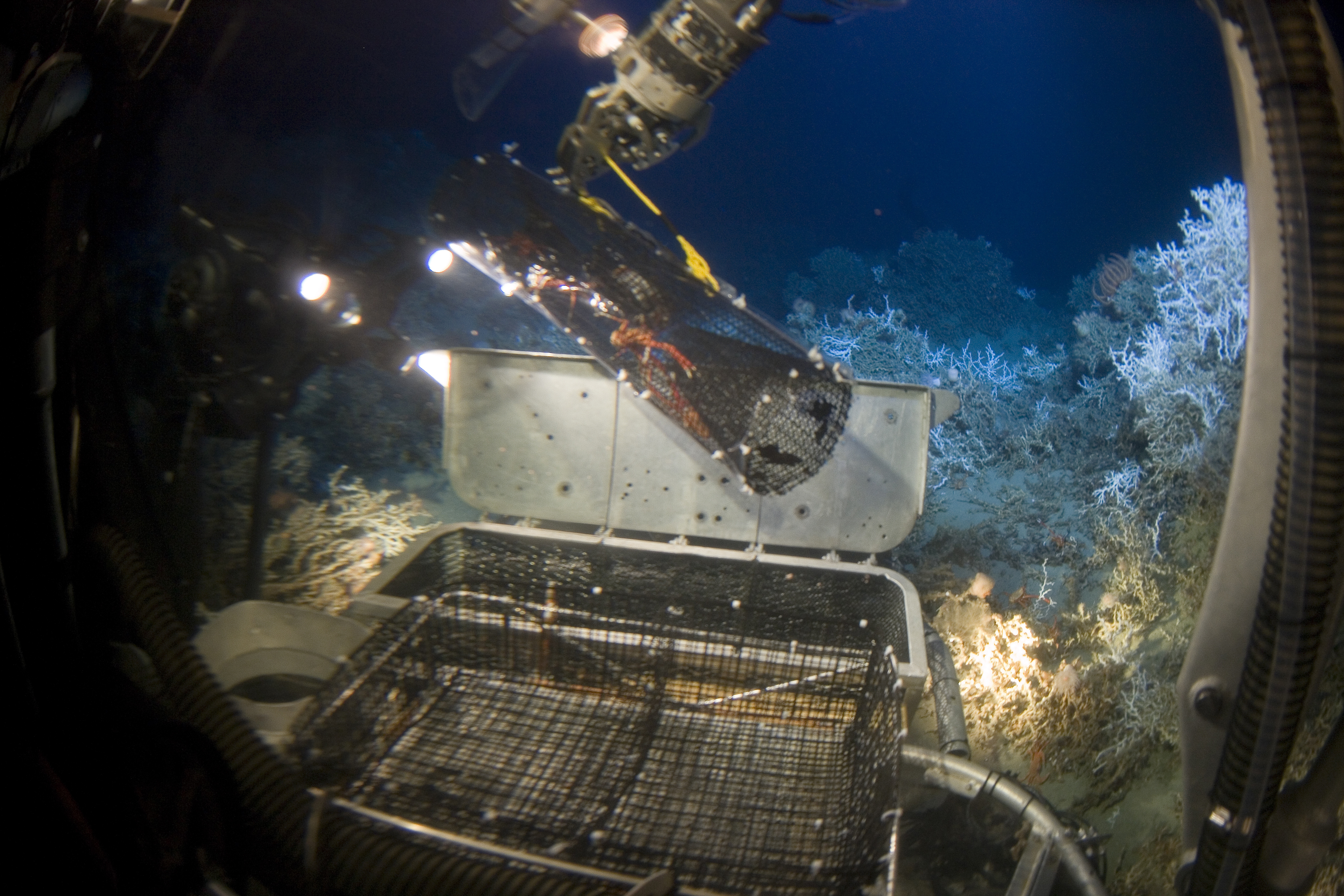
The submersible's manipulator arm collecting a crab trap containing five galatheid crabs. This is an eel trap that has been modified to better catch deep sea fauna. Life on the Edge 2005 Expedition.

Deep-sea exploration is the investigation of physical, chemical, and biological conditions on the sea bed, and water column beyond the continental shelf for scientific, commercial or other purposes. Deep-sea exploration is considered a relatively recent human activity compared to the other areas of geophysical research, as the depths of the sea have been investigated only during comparatively recent years. The ocean depths still remain a largely unexplored part of the Earth, and form a relatively undiscovered domain.

In general, modern scientific deep-sea exploration can be said to have begun when French scientist Pierre-Simon de Laplace investigated the average depth of the Atlantic Ocean by observing tidal motions registered on Brazilian and African coasts. He calculated the depth to be 3,962 metres (12,999 ft), a value later proven quite accurate by echo-sounding measurement techniques. Later on, due to increasing demand for the installment of submarine cables, accurate measurements of the sea floor depth were required and the first investigations of the sea bottom were undertaken. The first deep-sea life forms were discovered in 1864 when Norwegian Michael Sars obtained a sample of a stalked crinoid at a depth of 3,109 m (10,200 ft).

=== Coastal waters ===
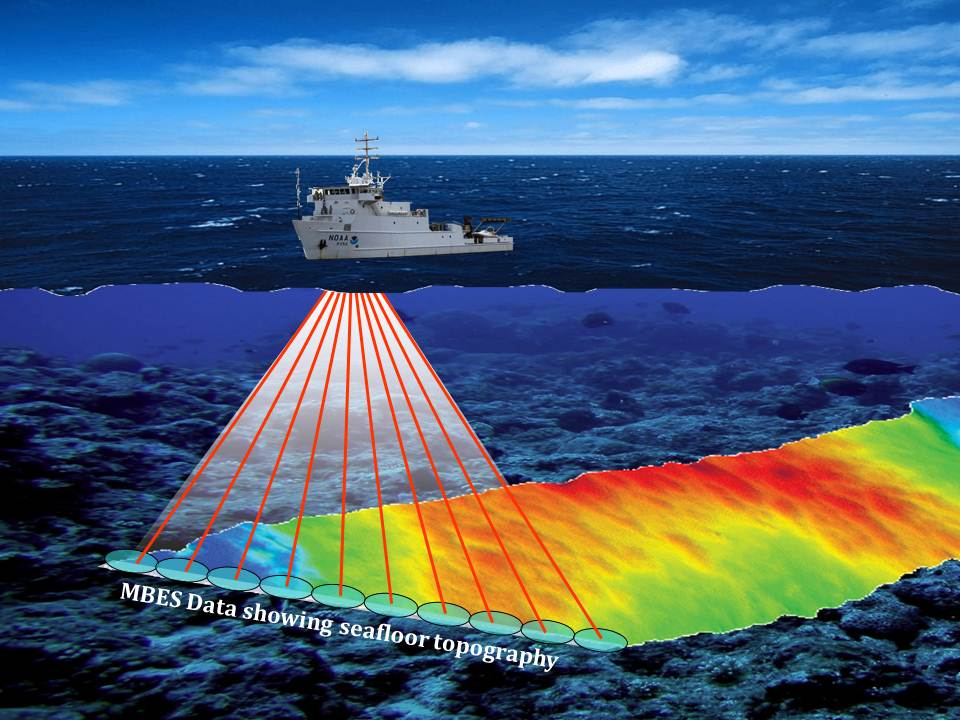
Multibeam sonar bathymetry is an accurate and efficient way of mapping waters of moderate depth.

Coastal waters and waters of the continental shelf have been explored more systematically than deeper waters, since they are to a large extent within the exclusive economic zone of adjoining countries, and are relatively accessible.

- Relatively shallow, seldom more than 200 m, so generally accessible to ambient pressure diving, though special procedures may be necessary for most offshore diving.
  - A small part of inshore coastal waters is shallower than 50 m, making it reasonably easily accessible to divers.
- Most is accessible to surface vessels, ROUVs and AUVs. Very shallow areas of heavy reef may be relatively inaccessible to vehicles of any kind, particularly in high energy zones (heavy swell, surge, surf, tidal and other currents), but may be occasionally be accessible to Lidar.
- Very large in extent.
- Economically and strategically important for navigation.
- Relatively extensively and intensively surveyed. Extent and approximate depths are mostly known. Detailed topography is being systematically surveyed in some places. According to GEBCO data, about 50% of coastal waters were not yet surveyed as of 2019.

=== Lakes and rivers ===
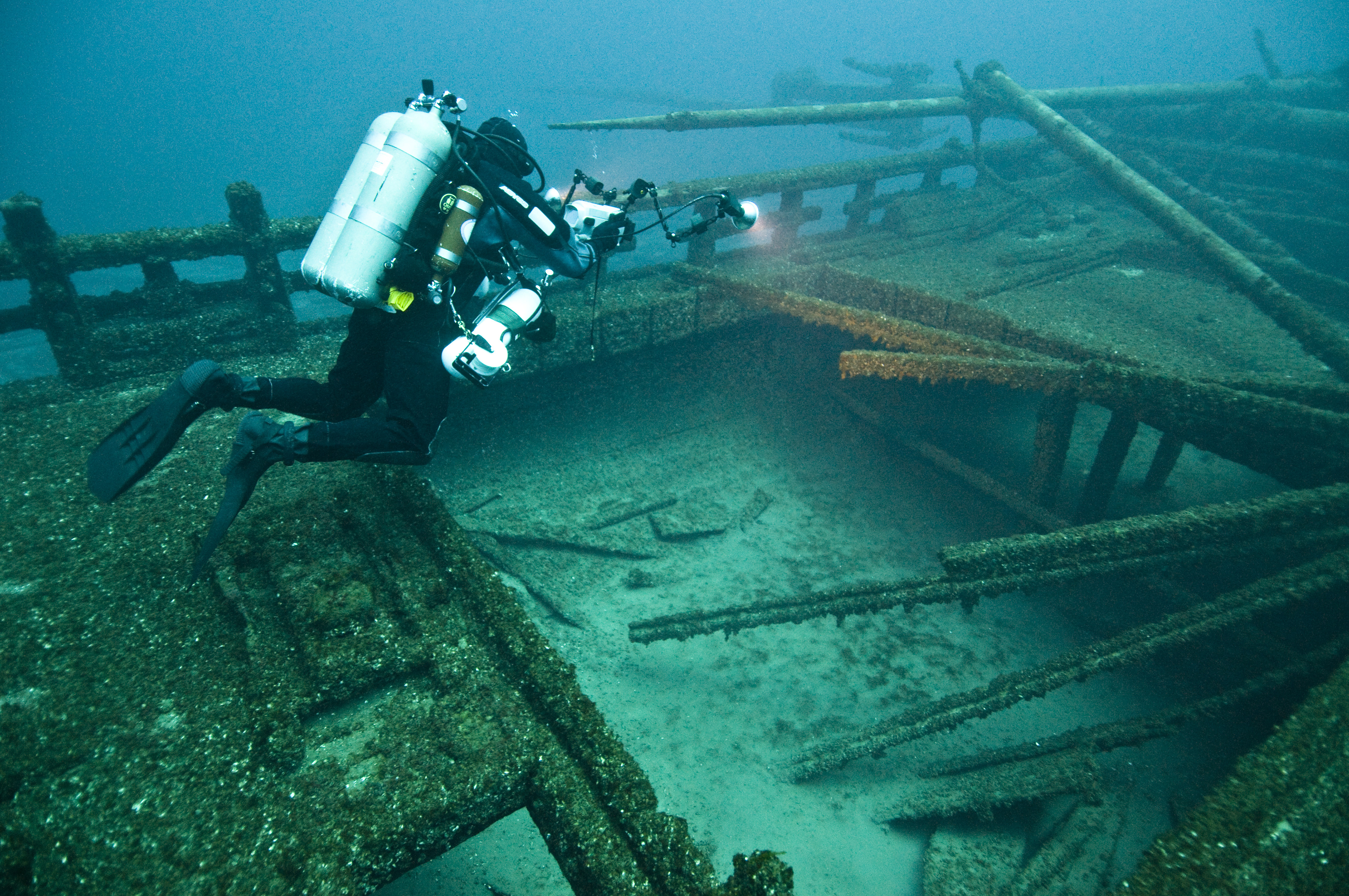
Wreck of the Audubon in upper Lake Huron

Inland waters. Mostly, but not exclusively fresh water.

The exploration of lakes is done in much the same way as exploration of coastal waters, and is often simplified by relatively small water movement, and shallow depths, though depths can easily extend beyond the range for ambient pressure diving. Visibility ranges between the best, nearing the theoretical maximum for water, and the worst, effectively zero, or measurable in millimeters.

Rivers have the complication of flow, which can range from sluggish to rapid and extremely turbulent, but are relatively shallow.

Many lakes and rivers are relatively easily accessible, others are in inaccessible places.

=== Caves ===
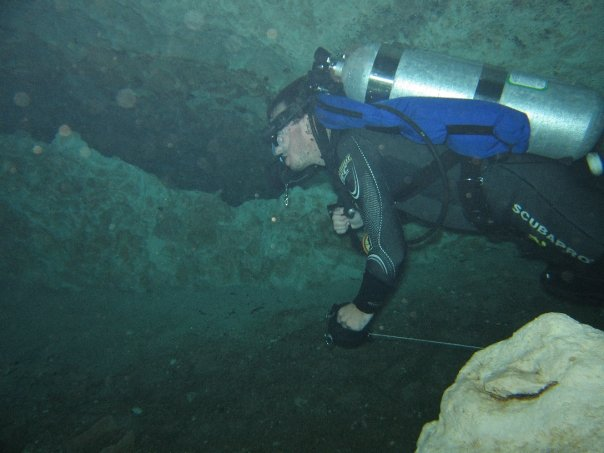
A cave diver running a reel with guide line into the overhead environment

The underwater environment in flooded caves is a relatively difficult and dangerous environment for exploration. There is a lack of natural light, limited line of sight, a general lack of free surface, and often very restricted space. The water can also be quite deep, and may have a strong flow. Cave-diving is underwater diving in fresh or seawater-filled caves. It may be done as an extreme sport, a way of exploring flooded caves for scientific investigation, or for the search for and recovery of other cave users. The equipment used varies depending on the circumstances, and ranges from breath hold to surface supplied, but almost all cave-diving is done using scuba equipment which gives the diver greater range and autonomy, but with a limited breathing gas supply, often in specialised configurations with redundancies such as sidemount or backmounted twinset. Remotely operated vehicles and autonomous underwater vehicles are also used for the exploration of flooded caves, as they do not risk human life and have a far greater operating depth range.

Underwater cave mapping is complicated by both a lack of access to the surface for GPS positions, darkness, with short line-of-sight, and limited visibility, which complicate optical measurement. Altitude/depth is relatively simple as accurate depth measurement is available to divers in the form of decompression computers, which log a depth/time record of reasonable accuracy and are available for instantaneous readout at any point, and depth can be referenced to the altitude at the surface. Vertical dimensions can be directly measured or calculated as differences in depth.

Surface coordinates can be collected via GPS and remote sensing, with varying degrees of precision and accuracy depending on the type of entrance. In some caves the water surface is in view of GPS satellites, in others it is a considerable distance along a complex route from the nearest open air. Three dimensional models of varying accuracy and detail can be created by processing measurements collected by whatever methods were available. These can be used in virtual reality models. The usual methods for survey and mapping of underwater caves are dead reckoning and direct measurements of distance, compass direction and depth, by diving teams of two or three scuba divers, who record azimuth of the cave line, measurements of height, width, depth, and slope at intervals along the line, generally using a permanent guide line as a reference baseline, and take photographic records of features and objects of interest. Data are collected on wet-notes and by digital photography. Where the depth or other constraints prevent divers from exploring in person, tethered and untethered remotely operated underwater vehicles (ROUVs) have been used effectively, using sonar technology to scan and map the surroundings, and video to record the appearance.

Features, artifacts, remains, and other objects of interest are recorded in situ as effectively as possible, generally by photography.

== Modes of exploration ==
Unknown or poorly known parts of the underwater environment may be explored directly by human observers, or measured and recorded by instruments. Direct measurements and remote measurements are used to suit circumstances. Direct observation is often used investigating new territory, and it is not yet known what to expect, or what instrumentation may be most useful, while remote measurements tend to be faster and where possible, produce useful results sooner and at lower cost, but are more limited in what they can observe.

=== Direct measurements ===
Direct measurements and observations of underwater objects and water properties may be done from a surface platform, by instruments deployed from a surface platform, by divers, from crewed submersibles, ROUVs, or AUVs. Direct observation is mostly used when remote observation is impracticable, impossible, or when accuracy requirements dictate. Most water properties other than velocity and surface temperature, such as temperature at depth, salinity, density, transparency, solute composition and particulate load require direct measurement, which may be done in situ or by recovering samples and testing them in the laboratory.

- Buoys
- Water column samplers
- bottom samplers
- Biological specimen collection and recording

==== Surface platforms ====
Surface platforms are commonly used as a base on which to mount, or from which to deploy instrumentation, which may be immediately recovered, or left to record data and recovered later.

==== Underwater diving ====
Divers are limited in mobility and range, and very limited by depth, but can interact directly with the environment which gives them great flexibility and precision of interaction, but are not inherently efficient for precise measurement of the broader environment, for which they need tools and recording equipment. Exploration by divers generally falls into two main categories: Exploration of flooded caves by dedicated cave divers, who map their progress and survey the caves, generally exploring in the meaning of seeking knowledge in places where it is not available by other means, and exploration of recreational dive sites, as a personal entertainment of visiting places not known to themselves and wandering around in the hope of serendipitous discovery. There are also a few recreational divers who systematically investigate and sometimes survey relatively unknown areas.

==== Crewed submersibles ====
Crewed submersibles have a much larger depth and lateral range than divers, but are less dexterous at precision manipulation and handling delicate materials and organisms. The presence of an operator with a direct view of the environment makes them logistically flexible, and plans can be changed on the fly to take advantage of serendipitous discoveries. Crewed submersibles allow personal exploration of otherwise inaccessible ocean depths, and can perform a variety of observation, sampling and measurement tasks.

==== Remotely operated and autonomous underwater vehicles ====
An autonomous underwater vehicle (AUV) is a robot that travels underwater without requiring continuous input from an operator. AUVs constitute part of a larger group of undersea systems known as unmanned underwater vehicles, a classification that includes non-autonomous remotely operated underwater vehicles (ROVs) – controlled and powered from the surface by an operator/pilot via an umbilical or using remote control. Underwater gliders are a subclass of AUVs.

A remotely operated underwater vehicle (technically ROUV or just ROV) is a (usually) tethered underwater mobile device, that is unoccupied, usually highly maneuverable, and operated by a crew, either aboard a support vessel, floating platform or on proximate land. They are generally, but not necessarily, linked to a host ship by a neutrally buoyant tether or, often when working in rough conditions or in deeper water, a load-carrying umbilical cable is used along with a tether management system (TMS). The TMS is either a garage-like device which contains the ROV during lowering through the splash zone or, on larger work-class ROVs, a separate assembly mounted on top of the ROV. The purpose of the TMS is to lengthen and shorten the tether so the effect of cable drag where there are underwater currents is minimized. The umbilical cable is an armored cable that contains a group of electrical conductors and fiber optics that carry electric power, video, and data signals between the operator and the TMS. Where used, the TMS then relays the signals and power for the ROV down the tether cable. Once at the ROV, the electric power is distributed between the components of the ROV. In high-power applications, most of the electric power drives a high-power electric motor which drives a hydraulic pump. The hydraulic system is then used for propulsion and to power equipment such as torque tools and manipulator arms where electric motors would be too difficult to implement underwater. Most ROVs are equipped with at least a video camera and lights. Additional equipment is commonly added to expand the vehicle's capabilities. These may include sonars, magnetometers, a still camera, a manipulator or cutting arm, water samplers, and instruments that measure water clarity, water temperature, water density, sound velocity, light penetration, and temperature.

=== Remote sensing ===
Remote sensing is usually more efficient for tasks covering large areas, such as bottom surface profiling, reflection seismology or measuring sea surface temperature over wide areas, and is generally used where the technology is available. Remote sensing is usually automated to some extent, and signal processing and data storage and analysis may also be automated. The remote sensing platform is often a surface vessel, but may also be a crewed submersible, ROV, AUV, aircraft of satellite. On occasion remote sensors have been carried by divers.

==== Techniques and technologies ====
Water depth measurable by lidar depends on the clarity of the water and the absorption of the wavelength used. Water is most transparent to green and blue light, so these will penetrate deepest in clean water. Blue-green light of 532 nm produced by frequency doubled solid-state IR laser output is the standard for airborne bathymetry. This light can penetrate water but pulse strength attenuates exponentially with distance traveled through the water. The surface reflection makes water shallower than about 0.9 m difficult to resolve, and absorption limits the maximum depth. Turbidity causes scattering and has a signifincant role in determining the maximum depth that can be resolved in most situations, and dissolved pigments can increase absorption depending on wavelength. Bathymetric lidar is most useful in the 0 to 10 m depth range in coastal mapping. On average in fairly clear coastal seawater lidar can penetrate to about 7 m, and in turbid water up to about 3 m. An average value is for the green laser light to penetrate water about 1.5 to 2 times Secchi depth. Water temperature and salinity have an effect on the refractive index which has a small effect on the depth calculation.

The ICESat-2 satellite has a laser altimeter intended for measuring the height of ice, but it was found that underwater reflections were also being recorded along shallow coastal zones. This has allowed areas where it is too shallow for most vessels to safely access to be bathymetrically mapped. The potential depth that ICESat-2's Advanced Topographic Laser Altimeter System (ATLASA) can reach is 38 m in optimum conditions.

A magnetometer is an instrument that measures magnetic field or magnetic dipole moment. They are widely used for measuring the Earth's magnetic field, in geophysical surveys, to detect magnetic anomalies of various types, and to find iron and steel shipwrecks.

Radar altimetry measures altitude above the terrain beneath an aircraft or spacecraft by timing how long it takes radio waves to travel to ground, reflect, and return to the craft. This type of altimeter provides the distance between the antenna and the ground or water surface directly below it. The variation of height of the sea surface can be interpreted to provide information on the profile of the seabed and information on the water above it.

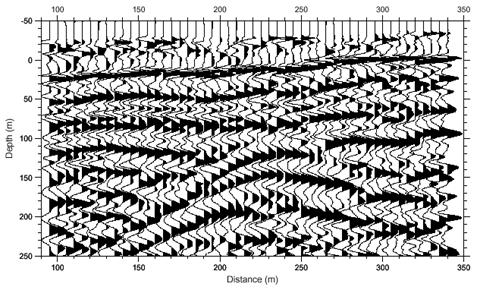
Seismic reflection data

Reflection seismology uses the principles of seismology to estimate the properties of the Earth's subsurface from reflected seismic waves, which are mechanical waves of low frequency acoustic energy. The method requires a controlled seismic source of energy, such as a specialized air gun or a seismic vibrator. Reflection seismology is similar in principle to sonar, but is useful in seabed structure where sonar frequencies cannot penetrate. Passive seismology can detect phenomena from tectonic movement to variation in wave strength in the open ocean.

Gravimetry is the measurement of the strength of a gravitational field. Gravimetry may be used when either the magnitude of a gravitational field or the properties of matter responsible for its creation are of interest. Gravimetric data have been found particularly useful for planning higher resolution sonar surveys.

Sonar is the most effective technology for underwater surveying, as sound propagates through water with less loss than electromagnetic energy, reflects well at a phase interface, can be produced at a wide range of frequencies with varying applications, and can be directionally focused with some precision, but the transducers must be in the water – sound does not propagate well through a gas-liquid or liquid-solid interface. Three main applications are used: single beam echo sounding is generally used for depth measurement below the vessel, side-scan sonar produces images showing the shape of underwater objects well, but is not very accurate for depth measurement, and multibeam echosounders provide fairly accurate three dimensional positions for a swath of points spread across the track of the transducer array.

Underwater photography, including photogrammetry and underwater videography.

=== Platforms ===
Undersea exploration is usually conducted from a platform, such as a ship, buoy, aircraft, or satellite. A seaborne surface platform may be used as a base to deploy divers, crewed submersibles ROUVs and AUVs, or may be directly equipped with remote sensors. Aircraft and satellites may carry remote senors with a longer range and wider view.

== Discoveries ==
Scientists estimate that the ocean contains between 700,000 and 1 million living species (excluding most microorganisms, of which there are estimated to be millions more), most of which are yet to be found and described.

== History ==
The 1872–76 Challenger expedition was the first major multidisciplinary undersea survey, which had the primary goal of discovering deep-sea life using dredging and nets, and also made physical, oceanographic, and chemical measurements of the oceanic environment.

Work on mapping the ocean bed accelerated after World War II, when sonar technology made faster depth measurement possible.

The first comprehensive map of the world ocean bottom was published in 1977 by geologists Marie Tharp and Bruce Heezen of Lamont Geological Laboratory at Columbia University in New York, in a collaboration that lasted from the 1950s into the 1970s. In the 1980s, William Haxby used satellite measurements to provide more information, using gravity field data to provide a low resolution map of the global seafloor.

The mass distribution of the seabed topography affects the local gravity sufficiently for satellite radar altimetry to record variations of sea surface height, which can be used to calculate the approximate underwater geomorphology. The map created in 2014 using this data revealed large numbers of previously unknown seamounts, and has roughly twice the resolution of the previous map created 20 years earlier. Data was used from the European Space Agency's (ESA) CryoSat-2 satellite and NASA's Jason-1 satellite.

The First World Ocean Assessment of 2015 showed that the ocean is important for the climate and support of life on the whole planet, and that critical ocean systems are under threat, making the exploration and mapping of the ocean a key environmental goal to facilitate understanding of the dynamics of ocean systems and the changes that are occurring.

By 2017 only about 6% of the ocean floor had been mapped. The United Nations Ocean Conference of that year challenged nations to complete that map and by 2020 the coverage had increased to about 20%.

In June 2022, the US formally joined the Seabed 2030 project, along with a number of other countries. At that time 23.4% of the seabed had been mapped, which included an increase of 10.1 million square kilometers of new bathymetric data from 2022, contributed by a diverse group of participants, including national governments, private companies, academic institutions and philanthropic partners.

== Organisations, programs and projects ==
- Global initiatives.
  - An international collaboration between the General Bathymetric Chart of the Oceans (GEBCO) and the Nippon Foundation (NF), to collect all available bathymetric data to produce a definitive map of the world ocean floor by 2030, called the Nippon Foundation-GEBCO Seabed 2030 Project, was launched at the United Nations Ocean Conference in New York on 6 June 2017. It is aligned with the UN's Sustainable Development Goal#14 to conserve and make sustainable use of marine resources and the oceans. Seabed 2030 is gathering depth data, identifying the unmapped areas, and working with the ocean mapping community to coordinate cartographic work. It is sponsored by the International Hydrographic Organization (IHO) and the Intergovernmental Oceanographic Commission (IOC).
  - United Nations Decade of Ocean Science 2030 Agenda for Sustainable Development Goals
  - Paris Agreement under the United Nations Framework Convention on Climate Change
  - Sendai Framework for Disaster Risk Reduction 2015-2030
  - Crowdsourced data: In 2014 the International Hydrographic Organization (IHO) started a project to gather crowdsourced bathymetry from vessels engaged in routine maritime operations and using standard navigation instruments to update and supplement more rigorous scientific bathymetric coverage. Most ships have the capacity to measure and digitally record the depth in coastal waters, and some are capable of taking useful measurements in deeper water. These data would be stored in the IHO Data Centre for Digital Bathymetry (DCDB) as received, and the end users would be responsible for deciding if and how to use them.
  - The Census of Marine Life was a 10-year, US $650 million scientific initiative, involving a global network of researchers in more than 80 nations, engaged to assess and explain the diversity, distribution, and abundance of life in the oceans. The world's first comprehensive Census of Marine Life — past, present, and future — was released in 2010 in London. Initially supported by funding from the Alfred P. Sloan Foundation, the project was successful in generating many times that initial investment in additional support and substantially increased the baselines of knowledge in often underexplored ocean realms, as well as engaging over 2,700 different researchers for the first time in a global collaborative community united in a common goal, and has been described as "one of the largest scientific collaborations ever conducted".
- NOAA Ocean Exploration is a US federal program tasked with exploring the deep ocean.
- Woodville Karst Plain Project
- National Speleological Society Cave Diving Section
- Quintana Roo Speleological Survey

== See also ==
- Bathymetry – Study of underwater depth of lake or ocean floors
- Cave Divers Association of Australia – Australian cave diving organisation
- Cave Diving Group – UK based cave diver training and certification agency
- Deep-sea exploration – Investigation of ocean conditions beyond the continental shelf
- General Bathymetric Chart of the Oceans – Publicly available bathymetric chart of the world's oceans
- List of underwater explorers – Professional and amateur explorers who have personally explored the underwater environment and contributed towards expanding the knowledge and understanding of that environment.
- Oceanography – Scientific study of the ocean
- Limnology – Science of inland aquatic ecosystems
- RISE project – 1979 international marine research project
- Satellite geodesy – Measurement of the Earth using satellites
- Speleology – Science of cave and karst systems
- Underwater archaeology – Study of human activity via evidence found underwater
- Wreck diving – Recreational diving on wrecks
