= HMS Challenger (1858) =

Pearl-class corvette and research vessel

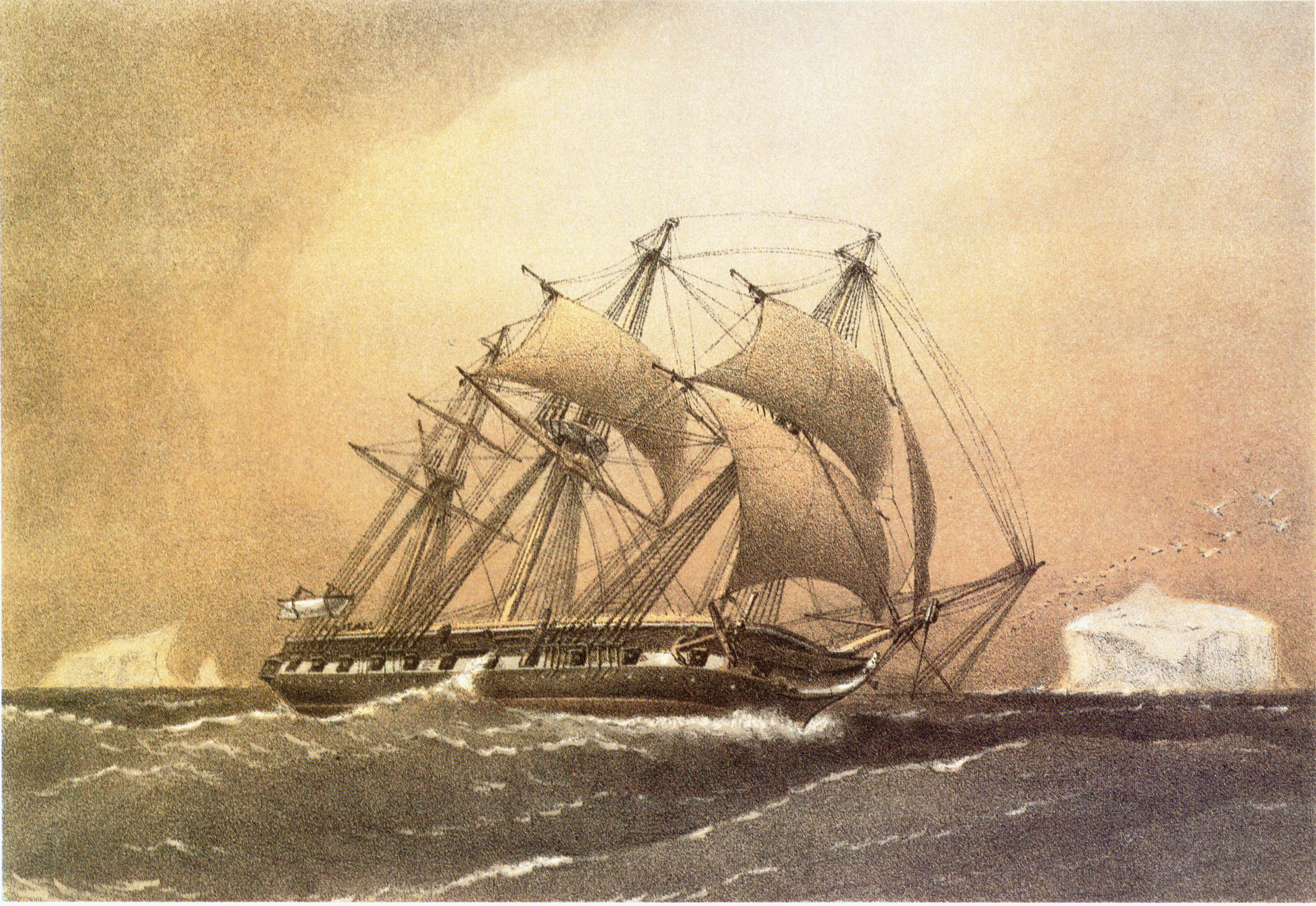
- Painting of Challenger by William Frederick Mitchell

History

United Kingdom
- Name: Challenger
- Builder: Woolwich Dockyard
- Launched: 13 February 1858
- Decommissioned: Chatham Dockyard, 1878
- Fate: Broken for scrap, 1921

General characteristics
- Class & type: Pearl-class corvette
- Displacement: 2,137 long tons (2,171 t)
- Tons burthen: 1465 bm
- Length: 225 ft 3 in (68.66 m) oa; 200 ft (61 m) (gundeck)
- Beam: 40 ft 4 in (12.29 m)
- Draught: 17 ft 4 in (5.28 m) (forward); 18 ft 10 in (5.74 m) (aft)
- Depth of hold: 23 ft 11 in (7.29 m)
- Installed power: 400 nominal horsepower; 1,450 ihp (1,080 kW)
- Propulsion: 2-cylinder trunk engine; Single screw
- Sail plan: Full-rigged ship
- Speed: 10.7 knots (19.8 km/h) (under steam)
- Armament: 20 × 8-inch (42 cwt) muzzle-loading smoothbore cannons on broadside trucks; 2 × 68 pdr (95 cwt)

HMS Scout, a sister ship of Challenger

HMS Challenger was a Pearl-class corvette of the Royal Navy, launched on 13 February 1858 at Woolwich Dockyard. She carried the first global marine survey, organised by the Royal Society in the 1870s.

As part of the North America and West Indies Station, she took part in naval operations during the Second French intervention in Mexico, including the occupation of Veracruz, in 1862. She was assigned as the flagship of Australia Station in 1866, undertaking a punitive expedition in Fiji before leaving the station four years later.

The Royal Society of London obtained the use of Challenger from the Royal Navy in 1872 and modified the ship to undertake the first global marine research expedition: the Challenger expedition (1872–1876). She carried a complement of 243, comprising officers (including commander George Nares), scientists (with Charles Wyville Thomson the chief scientific supervisor) and sailors, when she embarked on the 68,890-nautical-mile (127,580 km) journey.

The United States Space Shuttle Challenger was named after the ship. Her figurehead is on display in the foyer of the National Oceanography Centre, Southampton.

== 1873–1876: Grand tour ==
The Challenger expedition, which embarked from Portsmouth, England on 21 December 1872, was a grand tour of the world covering 68,890 nautical miles (127,580 km) organized by the Royal Society in collaboration with the University of Edinburgh. British scientist Charles Thomson led a large scientific team which accompanied the crew.

- Captains: George Nares (1873 and 1874) and Frank Tourle Thomson (1874 to 1876)
- Naturalists: Charles Wyville Thomson (1830–1882), Henry Nottidge Moseley (1844–1891) and Rudolf von Willemoes-Suhm (1847–1875)
- Oceanographers: John Young Buchanan (1844–1925) and John Murray (1841–1914)

To enable her to probe the depths, all but two of Challenger's guns had been removed and her spars reduced to make more space available for scientific instruments. Laboratories, extra cabins and a special dredging platform were installed as well.

She was loaded with specimen jars, ethanol for preserving samples acquired, microscopes and other chemical apparatus, trawls, dredges, thermometers, water sampling bottles, sounding leads and devices to collect sediment from the sea bed and great lengths of rope with which to suspend the equipment into the ocean depths. In all she was supplied with 181 miles (291 km) of Italian hemp for sounding, trawling and dredging. Challenger's crew was the first to sound the deepest part of the ocean, which was thereafter named the Challenger Deep.

Notable publications include: C.W. Thomson, Report on the scientific results of the voyage of HMS Challenger during the years 1873–76... prepared under the superintendence of the late Sir C. Wyville Thomson,... and now of John Murray,... (fifty volumes, London, 1880–1895); H.N. Moseley, Notes by a naturalist on the Challenger (1879); W.J.J. Spry, The cruise of the Challenger (1876).

== Later service and decommissioning ==
She was commissioned as a HM Coastguard and Royal Naval Reserve training ship at the Harwich Dockyard in July 1876. In 1878, Challenger went through an overhaul by the Chief Constructor at Chatham Dockyard with a view to converting the vessel into a training ship for boys of the Royal Navy. She was found suitable and was intended to take the place of HMS Eurydice which sank off the Isle of Wight on 24 March 1878.

The Admiralty did not go ahead with the conversion and she remained in reserve until 1883, when she was converted into a receiving hulk in the River Medway, where she stayed until she was sold to J B Garnham on 6 January 1921 and broken up for her copper bottom that same year. Only her figurehead now remains, kept at the National Oceanography Centre, Southampton.

== See also ==
- European and American voyages of scientific exploration
