= Marine biology dredge =

Scientific sampling equipment

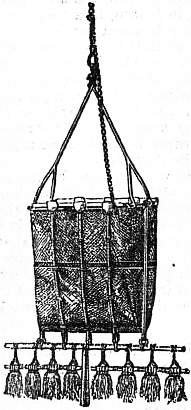
A shallow-water dredge from the 1870s Challenger expedition

The marine biology dredge is used to sample organisms living on a rocky bottom or burrowing within the smooth muddy ocean floor, known as the benthic zone. The dredge is pulled by a boat and operates at any depth on a cable or line, generally with a hydraulic winch. The dredge digs into the ocean floor and brings the organisms to the surface where they are caught in a net that either follows behind or is a part of the digging apparatus.

Early dredging samplers did not have a closing device, and many organisms were washed out. This led to a mistaken impression that the deep seabed lacked species diversity, as theorised by Edward Forbes in his Azoic hypothesis. Later samplers devised by Howard L. Sanders and the epibenthic sled designed by Robert Hessler showed that the deep seabed is sometimes rich in soft-bottom benthic species.

== History ==
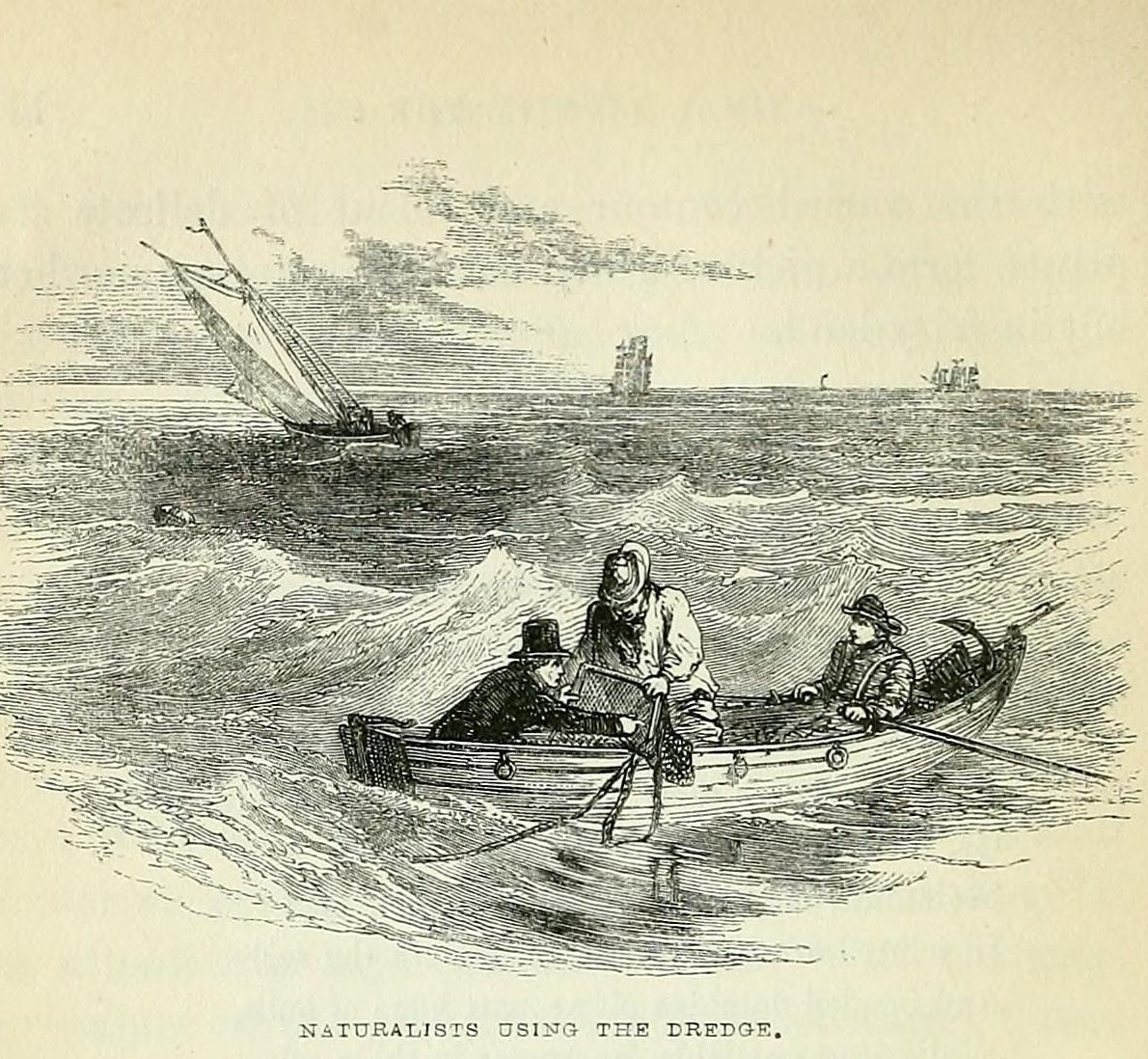
"Naturalists using the dredge", a plate from William Henry Harvey's The Seaside Book

The first marine biology dredge was designed by Otto Friedrich Müller and in 1830 the results of two dredging expeditions undertaken by Henri Milne-Edwards and his friend Jean Victoire Audouin during 1826 and 1828 in the neighbourhood of Granville were published. This was remarkable for clearly distinguishing the marine fauna of that portion of the French coast into four zones.

Müller's design was modified by the Dublin naturalist Robert Ball in 1838. At the Birmingham meeting of the British Association for the Advancement of Science in 1839, a committee was appointed for dredging research, with a view to the investigation of the marine zoology of Great Britain, the illustration of the geographical distribution of marine animals, and the more accurate determination of the fossils of the Pliocene period. The committee was led by Edward Forbes. Later annual reports of the association contained communications from the English, Scottish and Irish branches of the committee, and in 1850 Forbes submitted his first general report on British marine zoology. Ball's dredge was still in use in 1910.

In the 20th century the anchor-dredge was developed to sample deep burrowing animals. It is not towed but digs in, and is released, in the manner of an anchor.

The wide variety of dredges and other benthic sampling equipment makes site comparison difficult.

== Gallery ==
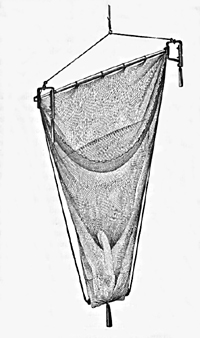
Deep-water dredge from the Challenger expedition

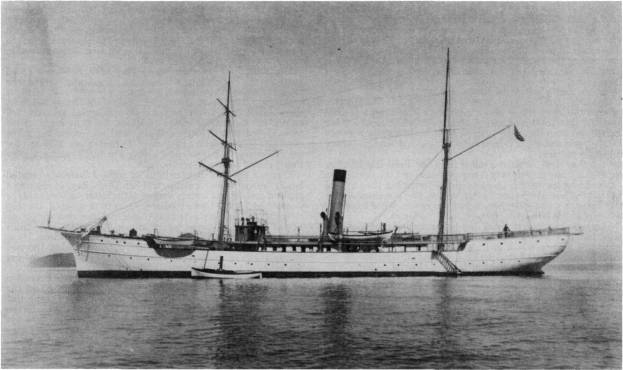
USS Albatross – dredges were an important research tool on this marine research vessel

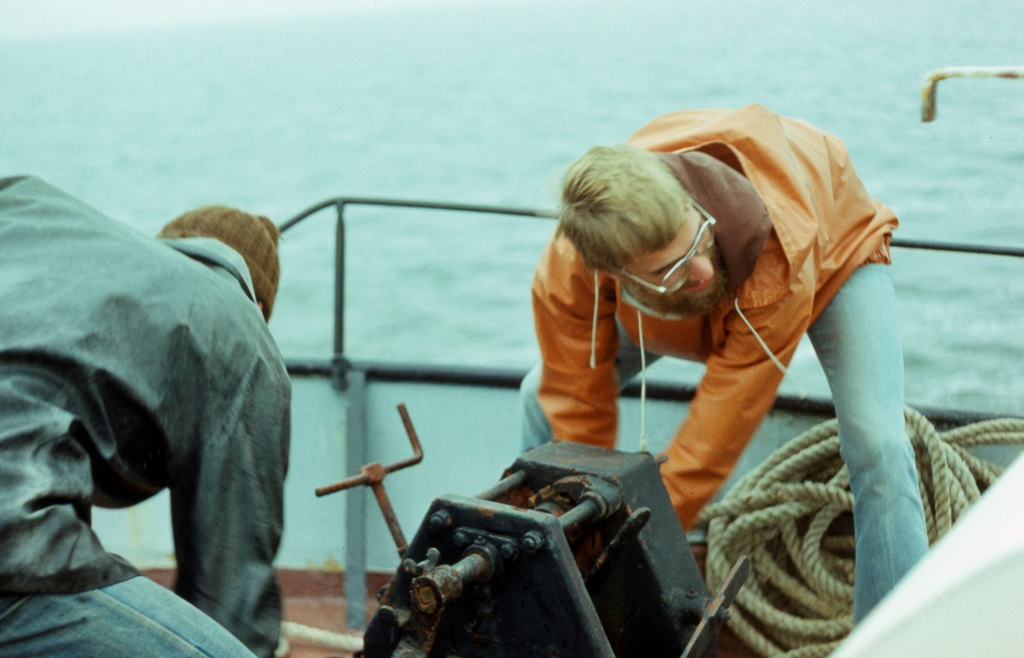
Marine ecologists aboard a research ship and next to a dredge winch

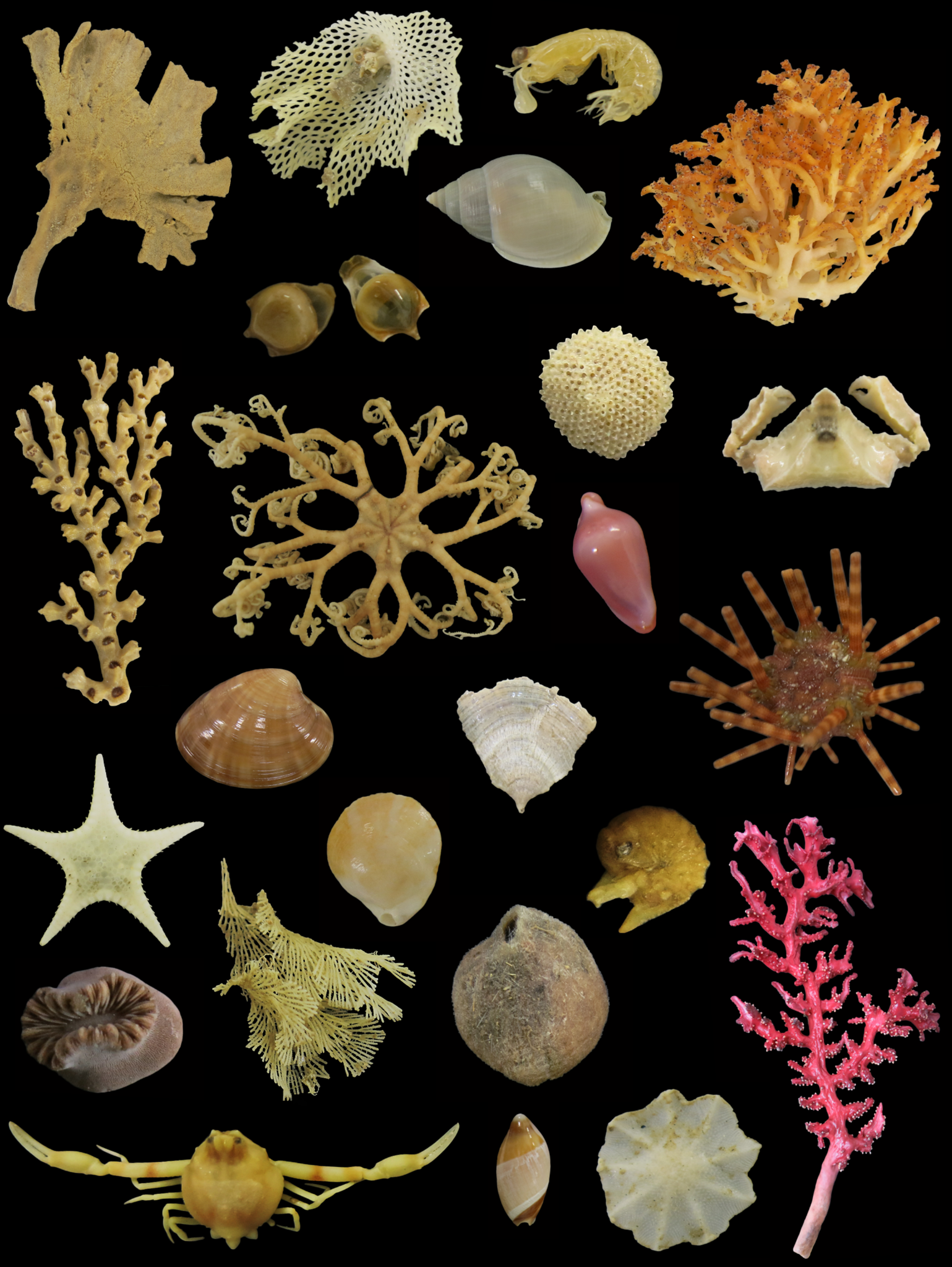
Specimens of benthic invertebrates collected via dredge sampling during research expeditions in the Indian Ocean

== See also ==
- Fishing dredge
