= Laurens Peninsula =

Peninsula on Heard Island in the Indian Ocean

Laurens Peninsula (53°0′S 73°18′E) is a rugged peninsula surmounted by several ice-covered peaks that forms the northwestern part of Heard Island in the southern Indian Ocean. The name was applied by the Australian National Antarctic Research Expedition following their survey in 1948. It derives from the existing name Cape Laurens, applied for the northwestern extremity of this peninsula after the American bark Laurens which, under Captain Franklin F. Smith, visited Heard Island in 1855–56 and assisted in initiating sealing operations there.

A small hill called Macey Cone sits at the northwest end of the peninsula. It is connected to the main island by the Fidelia Isthmus, although new channels are increasingly separating the two areas.
