= HMS Meteor (1823) =

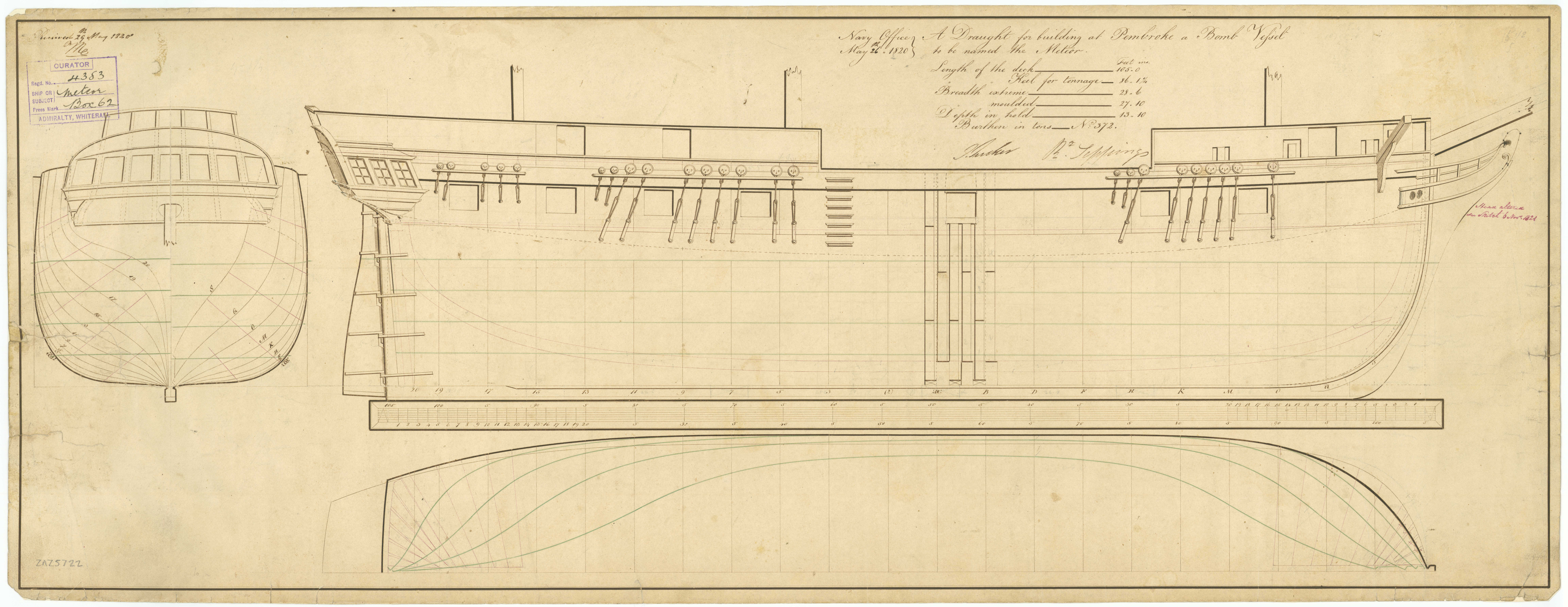
- Meteor

History

United Kingdom
- Name: Meteor
- Ordered: 18 May 1819
- Builder: Pembroke Dockyard
- Laid down: May 1820
- Launched: 25 June 1823
- Completed: 17 June 1824
- Renamed: As Beacon, June 1832
- Reclassified: As survey ship, July 1832
- Fate: Sold, 17 August 1846

General characteristics
- Class & type: Hecla-class bomb vessel
- Tons burthen: 378 bm
- Length: 106 ft (32.3 m) (gundeck); 87 ft 1 in (26.5 m) (keel)
- Beam: 28 ft 11 in (8.8 m)
- Draught: 10 ft 9 in (3.3 m)
- Depth: 13 ft 10 in (4.2 m)
- Complement: 67
- Armament: 2 × 6-pdr cannon; 8–10 × 24-pdr carronades; 1 × 10 in (254 mm) mortar; 1 × 13 in (330 mm) mortar

HMS Meteor was a Hecla-class bomb vessel built for the Royal Navy during the 1820s. In July 1832 she was renamed Beacon and reclassified as a survey ship, and was sold in 1846.

== Description ==
Meteor had a length at the gundeck of 106 feet (32.3 m) and 87 feet 1 inch (26.5 m) at the keel. She had a beam of 28 feet 11 inches (8.8 m), a draught of about 10 feet 9 inches (3.3 m) and a depth of hold of 13 feet 10 inches (4.2 m). The ship's tonnage was 378 tons burthen. The Hecla class was armed with two 6-pounder cannon, eight or ten 24-pounder carronades and two mortars, one 10 inches (254 mm) and the other 13 inches (330 mm) in size. The ships had a crew of 67 officers and ratings.

== Construction and career ==
Meteor, the third ship of her name to serve in the Royal Navy, was ordered on 18 May 1819, laid down in May 1820 at Pembroke Dockyard, Wales, and launched on 25 June 1823. She was completed for sea on 17 June 1824 at Plymouth Dockyard.
