= List of botanical gardens in Ireland =

Botanical gardens in Ireland have collections consisting entirely of Ireland native and endemic species; most have a collection that include plants from around the world. There are botanical gardens and arboreta in all states and territories of Ireland, most are administered by local governments, some are privately owned.

- Belfast Botanic Gardens, Belfast
- National Botanic Gardens, Glasnevin, Dublin
- National Botanic Gardens, Kilmacurragh, County Wicklow
