= Ninian Niven =

Scottish horticulturist and landscape gardener

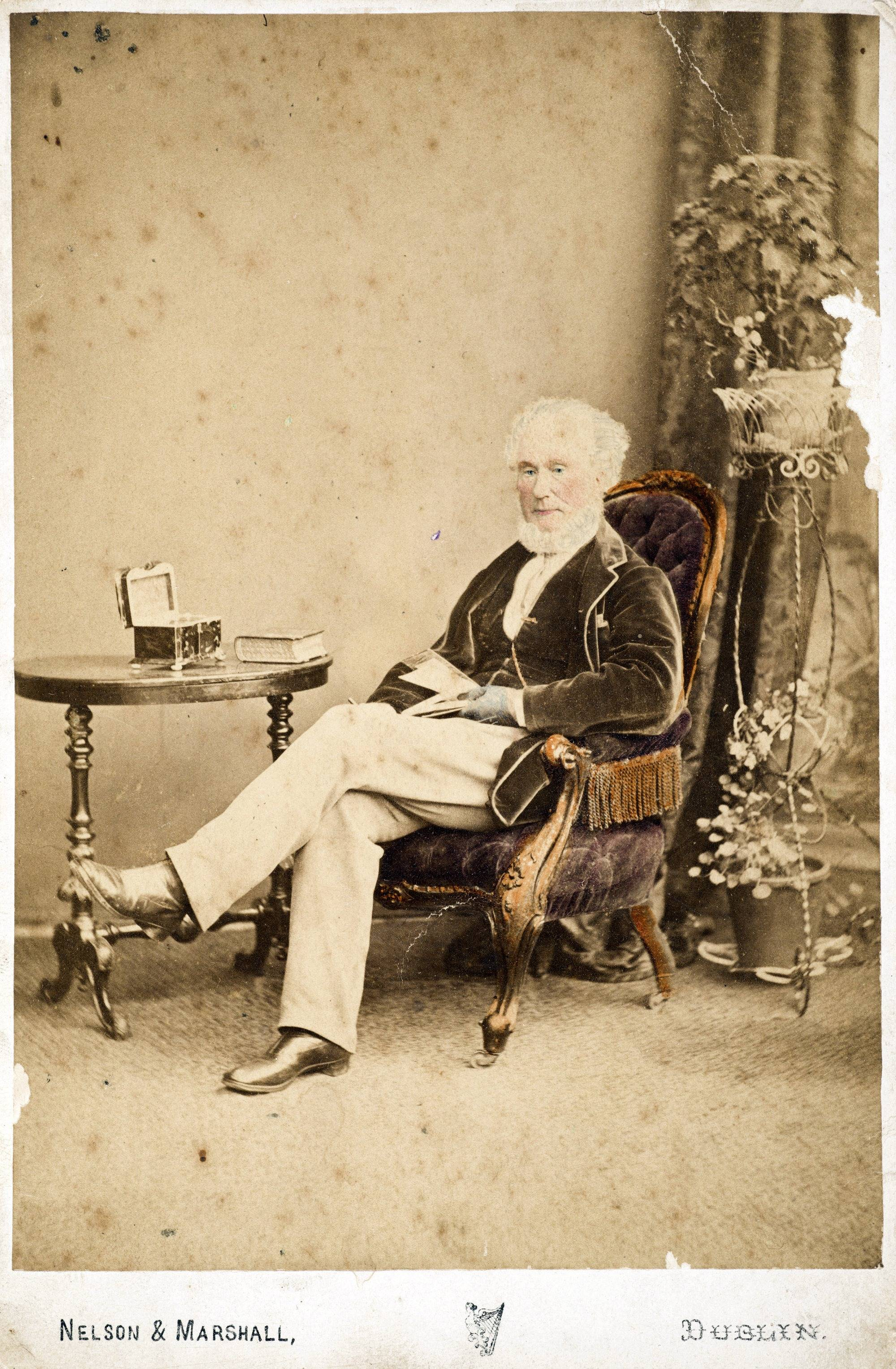
- Born: 1799; Kelvingrove, Glasgow, Scotland
- Died: 18 February 1879 (aged 79–80); Drumcondra, Dublin, Ireland

Ninian Niven (1799 – 18 February 1879) was a Scottish horticulturist and landscape gardener.

== Early life and family ==
Ninian Niven was born in 1799 in Kelvingrove, Glasgow. His father, also Ninian Niven, was a gardener at Keir House near Stirling, and travelled to the Cape of Good Hope twice collecting plants for George Hibbert and the Empress Josephine of France. Niven was schooled in Glasgow, and was apprenticed as a gardener at Bothwell Castle under Thomas Butler. He planned to become a plant collector, and studied plant drawing and painting after his apprenticeship. He returned to Bothwell for a time, and in 1822 he moved to Belladrum House, Inverness-shire.

Niven married Agnes Craig. One son, Francis Wilson, emigrated to Victoria, Australia and became a printer. Another son, James Craig (1828–1881), was a gardener in Belfast Botanic Gardens from 1843 and Kew Gardens from 1846, and went on to become curator of Hull Botanic Garden in 1855.

== Career ==
Niven was invited to take up the position of head gardener of the grounds of the official residence of the chief secretary for Ireland in the Phoenix Park, Dublin in 1827. Over the course of 8 years he developed his landscaping skills and remodelled the garden. In March 1834 he became the curator of the Botanic Gardens, Glasnevin. Here he concentrated his efforts on expanding the plant collection, as well as restoring and improving the layout of the neglected gardens. In 1838 he published his Visitor's companion to the Botanic Gardens. Four years after his appointment, visitor numbers had risen from 7,000 a year to over 20,000. He also established the first horticultural training courses at the gardens, which are still a feature of the gardens' work.

He resigned from the Botanic Gardens in October 1838, and established the Garden Farm nursery in Clonturk Lodge, Drumcondra, Dublin. This nursery specialised in vines and fruit trees. Niven also ran horticultural courses from his home at Sandycourt, Drumcondra. As a landscape designer, he designed the gardens of many Irish country houses, influenced by his visit to France in the 1830s. In the Phoenix Park alone he designed the gardens of the viceregal lodge, chief secretary's lodge, and under-secretary's lodge as well as the People's Garden there. He also designed the Iveagh Gardens for the great exhibition of 1865, and Hilton Park, Clones, County Monaghan in 1870. He also drew and painted plants for publication such as the Botanist.

Niven was an active member of the Royal Horticultural Society, serving as secretary from 1847 to 1853. He was also an associate of the Linnean Society. He wrote a number of articles for gardening periodicals. He won a silver medal from the Royal Dublin Society in 1835 for an essay on the potato crop failure. During the Great Famine, he published a pamphlet, The potato epidemic and its probable consequences, in the form of an open letter to Augustus FitzGerald, 3rd Duke of Leinster. He mistakenly attributed the cause of the potato disease to atmospheric conditions, unlike David Moore, who correctly deduced the cause of the blight. In 1869 he published a volume of poems, Redemption thoughts.

He worked in his garden at Garden Farm until the day he died, on 18 February 1879.
