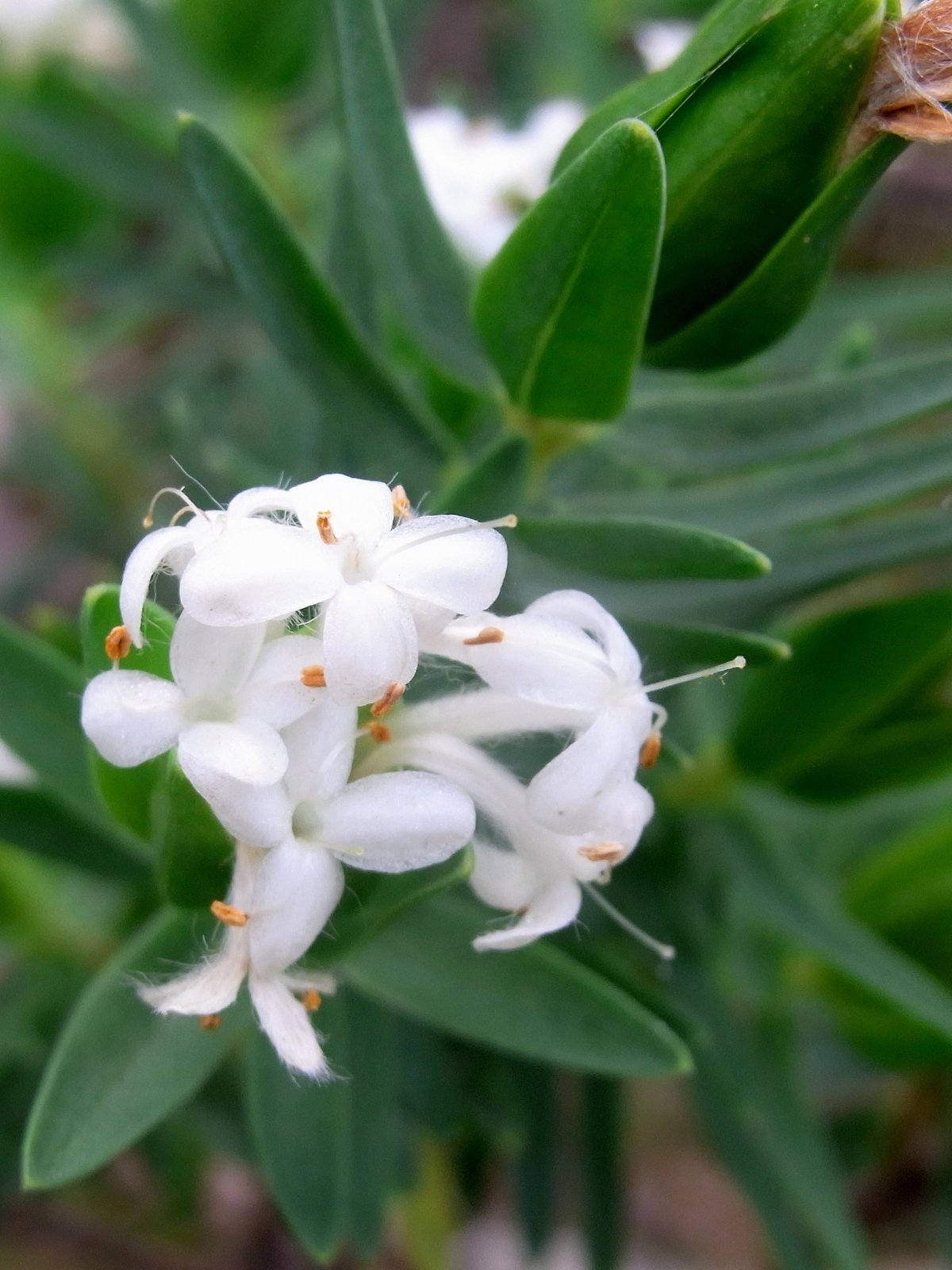

Scientific classification
- Kingdom: Plantae
- Clade: Tracheophytes
- Clade: Angiosperms
- Clade: Eudicots
- Clade: Rosids
- Order: Malvales
- Family: Thymelaeaceae
- Genus: Pimelea
- Species: P. congesta

Binomial name
- Pimelea congesta C.Moore & F.Muell.

= Pimelea congesta =

Species of flowering plant

Pimelea congesta is a species of flowering plant in the family Thymelaeaceae and is endemic to Lord Howe Island in Australia. It is a shrub with rough bark, decussate, elliptic leaves and heads of white flowers.

== Description ==
Pimelea congesta is a shrub that typically grows to a height of up to 2 m (6 ft 7 in) and has tough, red bark. The leaves are closely overlapping, decussate, elliptic or narrowly lance-shaped, mostly 10–20 mm (0.39–0.79 in) long and 4–6 mm (0.16–0.24 in) wide on a petiole about 0.5 mm (0.020 in) long. The leaves are leathery, dull pale green, and glabrous. The flowers are white and borne in heads of about 9 flowers on the ends of branchlets. The sepals are white, egg-shaped, silky-hairy on the lower part and about 2 mm (0.079 in) long, the floral cup 10–15 mm (0.39–0.59 in) long and the stamens protruding from the floral tube. Flowering occurs from mid-July to mid-October and the fruit is a brown, elliptic nut 2–3 mm (0.079–0.118 in) long.

== Taxonomy ==
Pimelea congesta was first formally described in 1872 by Charles Moore and Ferdinand von Mueller in Fragmenta Phytographiae Australiae from specimens collected by Moore on "the top of Mount Lidgbird and in other places on Lord Howe's Island". The specific epithet (congesta) refers to the congested inflorescence.

== Distribution and habitat ==
The species is endemic to Lord Howe Island where it is widespread, especially on exposed ridges. It is closely related to Pimelea longifolia of New Zealand.
