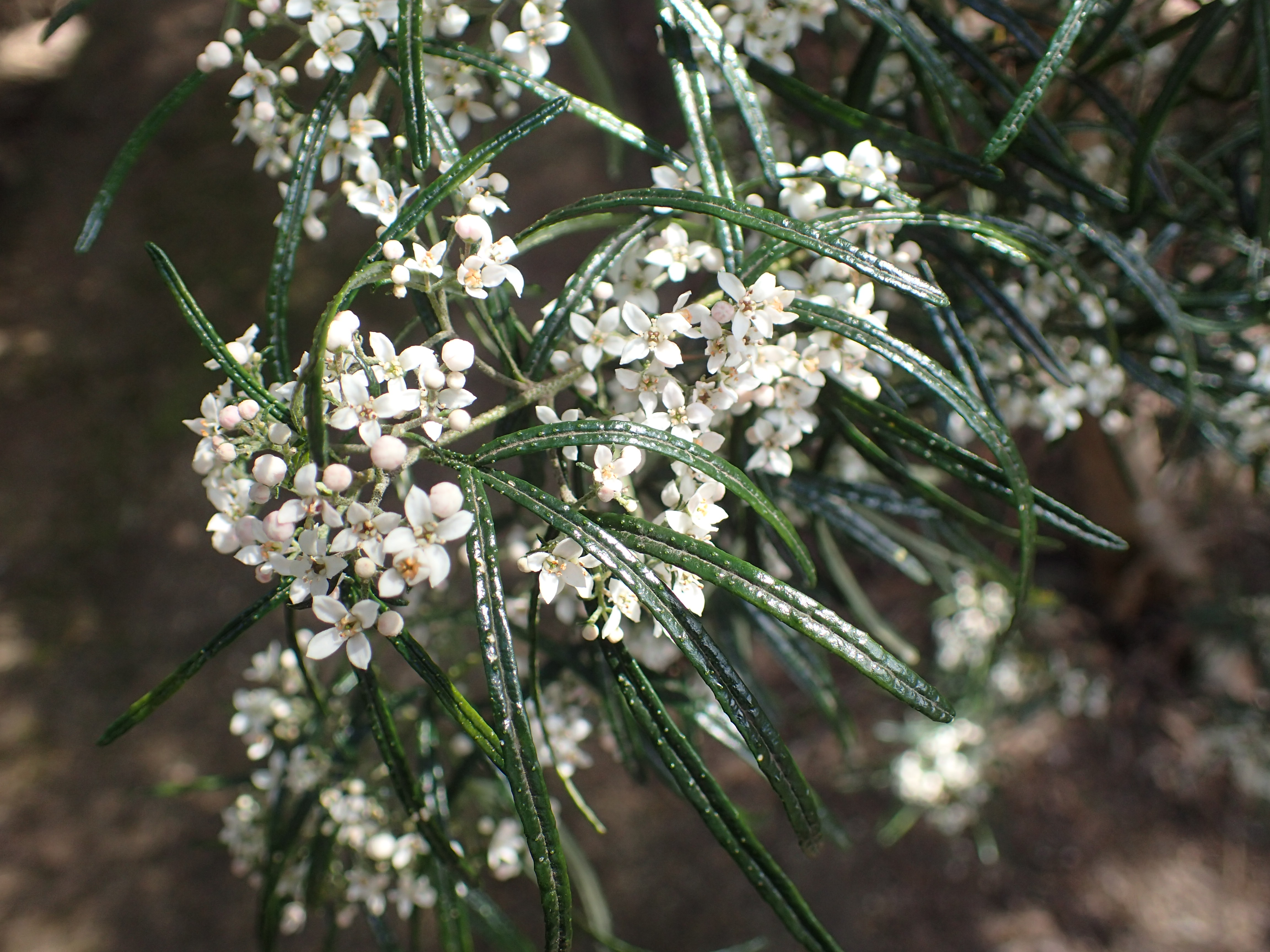
- Leaves and flowers

Conservation status
- Endangered (EPBC Act)

Scientific classification
- Kingdom: Plantae
- Clade: Tracheophytes
- Clade: Angiosperms
- Clade: Eudicots
- Clade: Rosids
- Order: Sapindales
- Family: Rutaceae
- Genus: Zieria
- Species: Z. granulata

Binomial name
- Zieria granulata C.Moore ex Benth.

= Zieria granulata =

Illawarra zieria

Species of flowering plant

Zieria granulata, commonly known as the Illawarra zieria, hill zieria or hilly zieria, is a plant in the citrus family Rutaceae and is endemic to the Illawarra region of New South Wales. It is a tall, bushy shrub distinguished by the wart-like tubercles that cover the entire plant, its linear leaflets and small white, four-petalled flowers.

== Description ==
Zieria granulata is bushy, aromatic shrub which grows to a height of about 3 m (10 ft) or as high as 6 m (20 ft) in ideal conditions. The branches are covered with warty tubercles and the youngest branches are covered with short, silky hairs. Its leaves are composed of three more or less linear leaflets, with the middle leaflet 15–40 mm (0.6–2 in) long and about 1 mm (0.04 in) wide with the other leaflets smaller. The edges of the leaflets have small teeth and are curved downwards. The upper surfaces are dull green, hairy at first while the lower surface in whitish and covered with soft hairs. Both surfaces are covered with tubercles. The leaf stalk is 3–10 mm (0.1–0.4 in) long.

The flowers are white and are arranged in groups of up to 180 flowers in leaf axils, each flower 3.5–7 mm (0.1–0.3 in) in diameter. The groups are shorter than the leaves and the flowers have four glabrous sepal lobes less than 1 mm (0.04 in) long. The four petals are 1.5–2.5 mm (0.06–0.1 in) long and in common with other zierias, there are only four stamens. Flowering occurs during spring and summer and is followed by fruit which is a dry, light brown capsule containing dark, reddish seeds about 2 mm (0.08 in) which have an ant-attracting elaiosome.

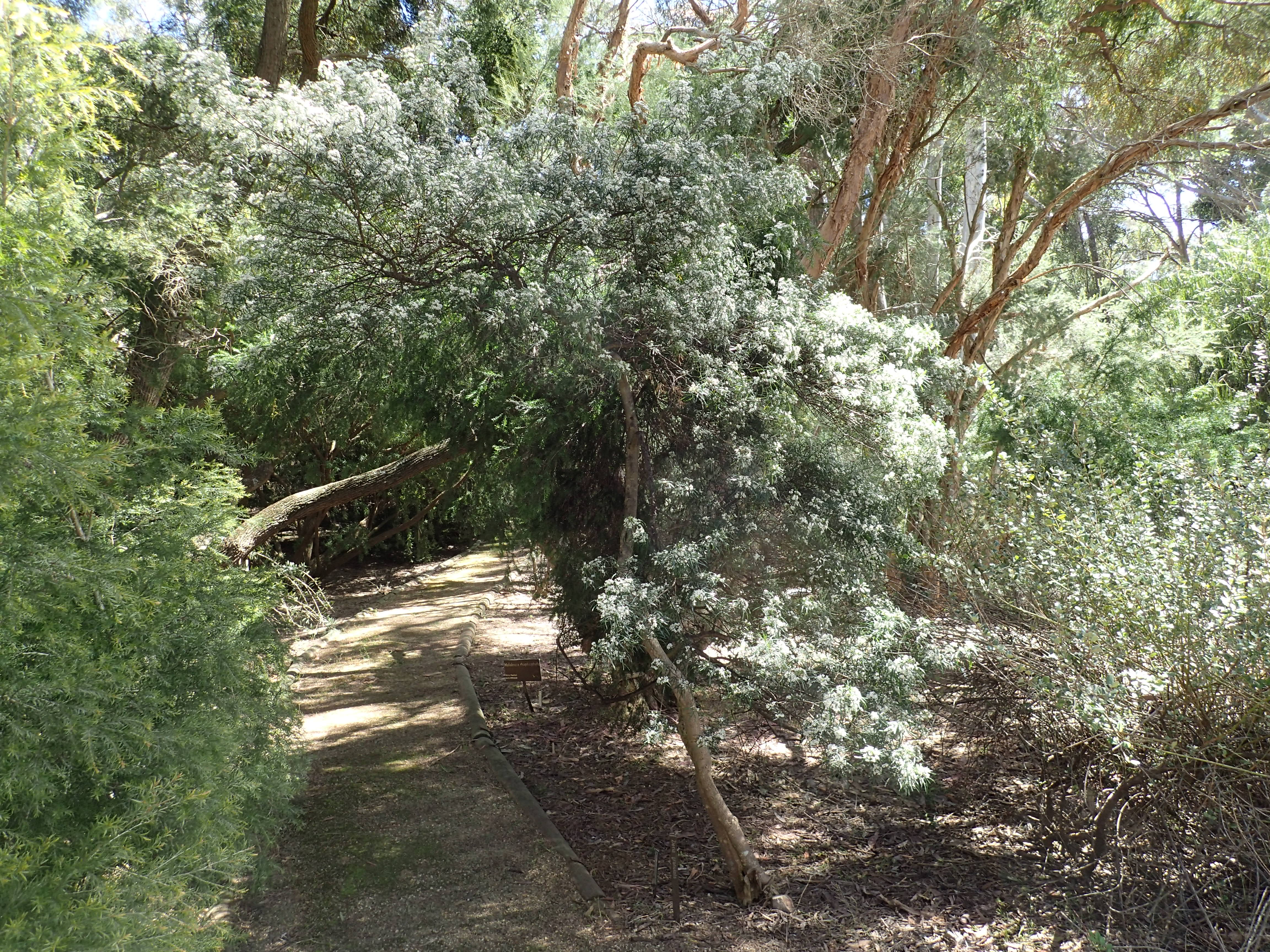
Habit in the Australian National Botanic Gardens

== Taxonomy and naming ==
Zieria granulata was first formally described in 1863 by George Bentham in Flora Australiensis, following a description by Charles Moore which had not been validly published. The specific epithet (granulata) is derived from the Latin word granum meaning "grain".

== Distribution and habitat ==
This zieria usually grows on rocky outcrops in shallow volcanic soils. It is only found in the Shoalhaven and Kiama districts on the south coast of New South Wales.

== Conservation ==
Zieria granulata is classified as "endangered" under the Commonwealth Government Environment Protection and Biodiversity Conservation Act 1999 (EPBC) Act . The main threat to its survival is loss of habitat due to land clearing, quarrying, residential development and road construction.

== Use in horticulture ==
Illawarra zieria is well known in cultivation and is hardy in well-drained soil. It prefers semi-shaded positions but will grow in full sun, is drought hardy and moderately frost hardy. Light pruning is recommended to maintain a bushy shape.
