= Swainsona cadellii =

Scientific classification
- Kingdom: Plantae
- Clade: Tracheophytes
- Clade: Angiosperms
- Clade: Eudicots
- Clade: Rosids
- Order: Fabales
- Family: Fabaceae
- Subfamily: Faboideae
- Genus: Swainsona
- Species: S. cadellii

Binomial name
- Swainsona cadellii F.Muell. ex C.Moore

Synonyms
- Swainsona cadelli C.Moore orth. var.; Swainsona greyana subsp. cadelli A.T.Lee orth. var.; Swainsona greyana subsp. cadellii (F.Muell. ex C.Moore) A.T.Lee

Species of plant endemic to Australia

Swainsona cadellii is a species of flowering plant in the family Fabaceae and is endemic to inland New South Wales. It is a shrubby perennial with imparipinnate leaves usually with 5 to 15 mostly narrowly egg-shaped leaflets, and racemes of 15 to 20 white, pink or purple flowers.

== Description ==
Swainsona cadellii is a shrubby perennial that typically grows to a height of up to 1 m (3 ft 3 in) with its stems glabrous or with a few soft hairs. Its leaves are imparipinnate, 15–50 cm (5.9–19.7 in) long with stipules usually 2–5 mm (0.079–0.197 in) long at the base. There are usually 15 to 20 mostly narrowly egg-shaped leaflets 10–20 mm (0.39–0.79 in) and 3–6 mm (0.12–0.24 in) wide. The leaflets are glabrous, or sometimes softly-hairy on the lower surface. The flowers are arranged in racemes 15–20 mm (0.59–0.79 in) long of 15 to 20, each flower on a pedicel about 5 mm (0.20 in) long. The sepals are joined at the base forming a tube about 3 mm (0.12 in) long, the sepal lobes about twice as long as the sepal tube. The petals are white, pink or purple, the standard petal 12–20 mm (0.47–0.79 in) long, the wings about 10 mm (0.39 in) long, and the keel 15 mm (0.59 in) long and 5 mm (0.20 in) deep. The fruit is an elliptic pod 25–40 mm (0.98–1.57 in) long on a stalk often more than 5 mm (0.20 in) long.

== Taxonomy and naming ==
Swainsona cadellii was first formally described in 1893 by Charles Moore in Handbook of the Flora of New South Wales from an unpublished description of Ferdinand von Mueller.

== Distribution and habitat ==
This species of swainsona grows in red sandy loam soils in woodland and grassland in the Warrumbungle Ranges and in other places on the North West Slopes of New South Wales.
