= Charles Moore (botanist) =

Australian botanist (1820–1905)

Charles E Moore
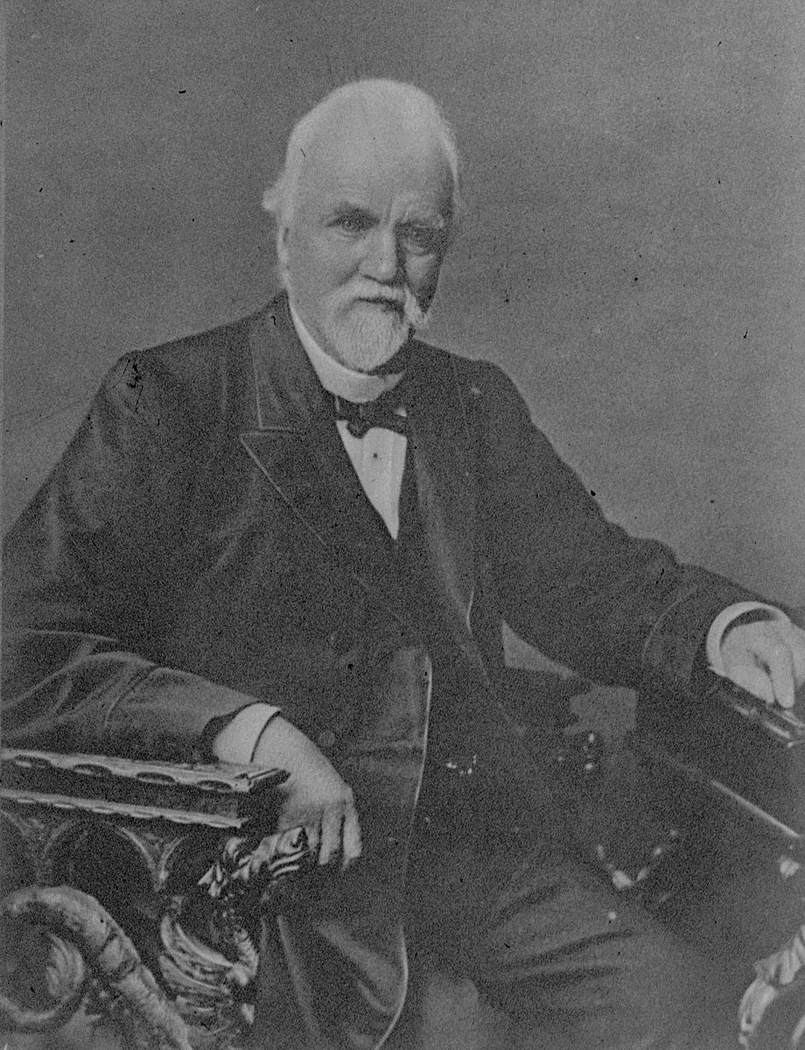
- Born: 10 May 1820; Dundee, Scotland
- Died: 30 April 1905 (aged 84); Paddington, New South Wales, Australia
- Known for: Director of the Royal Botanic Gardens, Sydney
- Scientific career
- Fields: botany
- Author abbrev. (botany): C.Moore

Charles Moore (10 May 1820 – 30 April 1905) was an Australian botanist and director of the Royal Botanic Garden, Sydney.

== Early life ==
Charles Moore was born Charles Moir in Dundee, Scotland on 10 May 1820. His parents were Charles, a gardener, and Helen Moir (née Rattray). The couple had 9 children, 7 of whom survived infancy. Moore had one sister and 5 brothers. The family changed their name to Moore in 1830, which was also sometimes spelt Muir. From age 12, Moore trained as a gardener in the Botanic Gardens of Trinity College, Dublin from 1832, having joined his brother David in Ireland after the death of their mother. He won a number of prizes while there, including the first premium in the Horticultural Society of Ireland's annual examination of journeymen gardeners in 1835.

He joined his brother in the Ordnance Survey as an assistant botanist in May 1837, and was appointed botanist of the Survey after his brother left in post in 1838, working in County Donegal. He was awarded a Templeton prize for a display of native plants at the Botanic Gardens, Belfast in 1838. He left his position at the Survey and moved to England, working in Regent's Park and from 1847 as a gardener in Kew.

== Career in Australia ==
In 1847 he was appointed a government botanist and director of the Botanic Gardens in Sydney, Australia by Earl Grey. He arrived in Sydney on 14 January 1848 and took up the position of Director of the Royal Botanic Garden, Sydney, a position he held until 5 May 1896. In this time he undertook several trips in eastern New South Wales as a plant and seed collector.

Moore began a programme to improve the gardens, which had been neglected, starting plant exchanges between the Garden and international botanical institutions and other donors. As his brother, David, was the director of the Botanic Gardens in Glasnevin, Dublin, there was a large volume of specimens exchanged between the two Gardens. He studied the native flora of Australia, while also researching the economic possibilities which led him to establishing a library and added a lecture theatre. He also founded a herbarium and a medicinal plant garden. In 1850, he collected specimens from New Hebrides, Solomon Islands and New Caledonia. Changes in the governance of the Gardens led to antagonism with some of the other staff and management. There was an unsuccessful campaign to remove him from his post, and to have his title downgraded from director to curator.

He amassed a collection of Australian timber specimens from his visits to the Blue Mountains in 1857, and the Richmond and Clarence Rivers in 1861. This collection was displayed at the 1862 London exhibition, and formed the basis for his A catalogue of northern timbers. He was a member of a number of societies both in New South Wales and London. In 1876 he was a commissioner for the Philadelphia and Melbourne exhibitions, and served as a trustees for several parks in Sydney. He did not enjoy writing, but he published two books A census of the plants of New South Wales (1884) and the Handbook of the flora of New South Wales (1893).

He visited Lord Howe Island in 1869, and attended the Botanical Congress and the International Horticultural Exhibition in Florence in 1874. In 1879, he landscaped the grounds of the Garden Palace, built for the Sydney International Exhibition. He was involved in the dismissal of Captain Richard Ramsay Armstrong in 1882. In 1883, he had J.C. Dunlop and his wife removed from the Gardens for displaying "uxorious affection". Dunlop successfully sued Moore, but the decision was reversed by the colonial secretary, Alexander Stuart.

== Death and legacy ==
After his retirement in 1896, he visited Dublin, travelling to the Gardens at Glasnevin. His nephew, Frederick William Moore, was curator at the time. Moore's wife, Elizabeth Bennett (née Edwards), died on 10 October 1891. Moore died on 20 April 1905 in Sydney, leaving an estate worth over £5,300. He is buried in Rookwood cemetery. Nineteen species were named after him by Ferdinand von Mueller.
