= Walter Wade (botanist) =

Irish physician and botanist

- Born: c. 1740; Dublin, Ireland
- Died: 12 July 1825; His home, 42 Dorset Street, Dublin

Walter Wade, MD (c.1740 - 12 July 1825) was an Irish physician and botanist. He was the first professor of botany at the National Botanic Gardens of Ireland.

== Early life and family ==
Walter Wade was born around 1740 in Dublin. His father, John Wade (died 1799), was an apothecary and chemist. His mother was Katherine Wade. John Wade proposed the foundation of a pharmacy in Dublin in 1767 which would dispense medicines to the poor. Sanctioned by the King and Queen's College of Physicians in Ireland (K&QCPI) and funded by the Dublin Society, the Chymical Elaboratory and Dispensary for the Poor at 66 Capel Street was the first pharmacy in Ireland.

Wade is thought to have studied at a French university as his uncle did, Walter Wade (fl. 1735–68). Walter Wade graduated from the University of Rheims (1735) with a degree in medicine. He went on to establish himself as a man-midwife in Dublin at 13 Bolton Street, and went on to lecture in midwifery at K&QCPI. Walter Wade may have been apprenticed to a surgeon in Dublin.

On 20 April 1781 (By License, Rev. Gore Wood), Walter Wade married Mary Chambers (1733/4–1831). Chambers was a Quaker and was expelled for marrying a non-quaker.

== Career ==
By 1776, Wade had established his practice in surgery and midwifery, first at Bolton Street, and later at his father's pharmacy on Capel Street. On 25 July 1777 a testimonial was signed by 10 of Dublin's most prominent physicians stating that Wade should receive a 'Diploma to Practice physick' because of the 'certain proofs of [his] capacity, skill and attention in his attendance on many persons committed to his care in the medical line' or had 'reason to believe him a person of medical experience'. Later, on 27 June 1786, he was conferred with the degree of doctor of medicine by the University of St Andrews, and in October 1786 was examined at K&QCPI and admitted as a licentiate.

Aylmer Bourke Lambert in a letter to (Sir) James Edward Smith states that through Wade's exertions a grant of £300 was obtained to establish the botanic garden at Dublin, and that he intended to publish a work entitled Flora Dublinensis. Undated folio sheets of this proposed work exist, with plates, under the title Floræ Dublinensis Specimen, but it was never carried out. This unrealised book was based on Flora Londinensis by William Curtis, and remained unpublished due to financial difficulties. Despite the manuscript not being published, Wade gave public lectures on botany in 1789 from his home on Capel Street, and in 1792 he was appointed lecturer on Botany at the Royal College of Surgeons in Ireland. He was later appointed founding professor of botany in 1804, remaining in that post until his death in 1825.

In 1792, he was elected an honorary member of the Dublin Society for Improving Husbandry, Manufactures and the Useful Arts, going on to present his manuscript, Catalogus systematicus plantarum indigenarum in Comitatu Dublinensi inventarum, to the Society. This work, dedicated to John Foster, is in Latin (275 pages 8vo), arranged on the Linnæan system, with carefully verified localities and indexes of the Latin, English, and Irish names. The sedges and cryptogamic plants were reserved for a second part, which was never published. Lady Kane, in her anonymous Irish Flora (Dublin, 1833), says of this work (preface, p. vii) that it was "the first that appeared in Ireland under a systematic arrangement", and that its author "may be justly considered as the first who diffused a general taste for botany in this country".

Wade was the first Irish botanist to study native Irish grasses, and in 1795 he presented his manuscript to the Society which listed the 41 species of grass he identified, along with dried specimens. Wade visited various parts of Ireland in search of plants in 1796.

It is thought that Wade was a member of the Dublin Society of United Irishmen in the 1790s. He was also a member of the Grand Master's Lodge of the Irish Freemasons and in 1793 was appointed deputy grand master of the Grand Lodge of Ireland, resigning in 1799. He was a member of the choral group, the Hibernian Catch Club.

== National Botanic Gardens ==
Wade submitted a petition to the Irish house of commons in 1790 which called for the foundation of a botanical garden in Dublin, which was passed under the Dublin Society act (1790). In 1795, land was purchased at Glasnevin for the Botanic Gardens, with Wade taking up the position of professor and lecturer in botany in 1796. He was also tasked with arranging the new gardens. Creating the original design, Wade travelled to gardens and nurseries in England to procure plants, and received many rare specimens and seeds as gifts from across Europe. After the opening of the gardens in 1800, the first catalogue was published in 1818, which is attributed to Wade. From 1802, Wade lived in the residence at the new gardens. He gave lectures from 1802 to 1823 which were open to the general public and free. The Duke of Bedford, the lord lieutenant of Ireland, attended his lectures in 1806. He also oversaw the establishment of a library at Glasnevin, which predates the library at Kew Gardens by 50 years. In 1801, he recorded the American pipewort, Eriocaulon aquaticum, in Ireland for the first time in Connemara.

== Later life and death ==
Wade noted that he gave 82 lectures at Leinster House and the Gardens in 1819, with the summer lectures attended by 2,554 people. He did also note his disappointment with the neglect of the Gardens, low attendance at lectures, and the lack of interest from the Dublin Society. He was criticised by The Lancet columnist, Erinensis, while others felt he was "deficient" in practical botany.

He was elected an associate of the Linnean Society in 1792, a Member of the Royal Irish Academy and a Fellow of the Royal Society in 1811.

Wade died on 12 July 1825 at his house on 42 Dorset Street, Dublin. The Public Record Office of Northern Ireland holds letters between Wade and John Foster in the Foster–Massereene papers.

== Selected publications ==
- Syllabus . . . of lectures on botany, and its connexion with agriculture, rural economy and the useful arts (Dublin, 1802)
- Catalogus systematicus rariorum in Comitatu Gallovidiae, praecipue Cunnemara, inventarum (Dublin, 1802)
- Plantae rariores in Hibernia inventae (Dublin, 1804)
- Quercus or oaks (Dublin, 1809)
- Salices (Dublin, 1811)

The standard author abbreviation Wade is used to indicate this person as the author when citing a botanical name.
