= Iveagh Gardens =

National park in Dublin, Ireland

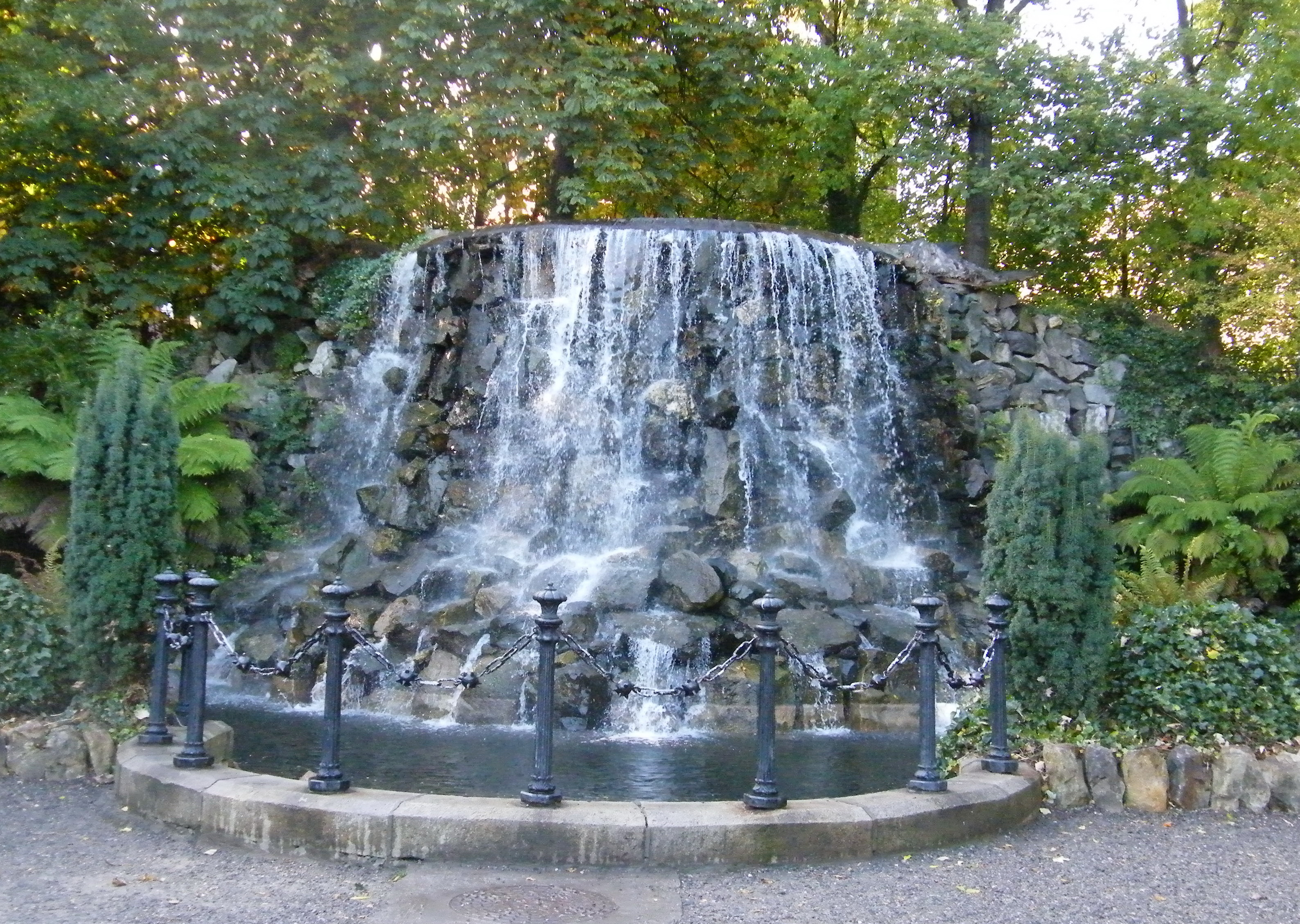
- Waterfall in Iveagh Gardens

- Location within Dublin Location within Ireland
- Type: Municipal
- Location: Dublin
- Coordinates: 53.336°N 6.262°W
- Area: 8.5 acres (3.44 ha)
- Created: 1865
- Operator: Office of Public Works
- Open: all Year
- Website: iveaghgardens.ie

The Iveagh Gardens (/ˈaɪviː/; Irish: Gairdíní Uí Eachach) is a public park located between Clonmel Street and Upper Hatch Street, near the National Concert Hall in Dublin, Ireland. It is a national, as opposed to a municipal park, and designated as a National Historic Property. The gardens are almost completely surrounded by buildings making them less noticeable and somewhat difficult to locate, unlike other green spaces in Dublin.

== History ==
The site of the gardens was shown in 1756 as Leeson's Fields after Joseph Leeson, 1st Earl of Milltown.

=== Clonmell Lawns ===
In the late 18th century Lord Milltown leased the land to John Hatch, the principal developer of Harcourt and Hatch Streets. Hatch sold it to The 1st Earl of Clonmell (also known as "Copper-Faced Jack") as his private gardens. The gardens then became known as "Clonmell Lawns" Located on Harcourt Street is Clonmell House that faces on to Clonmell Street which leads into the Iveagh Gardens. A subterranean passage brought the Earl from his house to the gardens without him having to walk over the street. The Wide Streets Commission had planned for Clonmell Street to run through what is now the gardens thereby linking Harcourt Street to the then newly constructed Earlsfort Terrace. However, this passage was not located during archaeological monitoring conducted during the construction of the LUAS.

=== Coburg Gardens ===
When the 1st Earl died in 1798, his son the 2nd Earl (then aged 14 years old) inherited the estate including Clonmell Gardens. The estate was sold in 1810 and the gardens were opened for public use around 1817 and renamed "Coburg Gardens" after the royal family of Saxe-Coburg. Entrance to the park was from the south side of St Stephen's Green, the "Royal Horse Bazaar".

The Coburg Gardens provided the setting for a major riot in August 1835, during which several Orangemen were badly injured. By 1860 the gardens had fallen into disrepair being used as a site for grazing sheep and dumping waste.

=== Dublin Exhibition Palace and Winter Garden ===
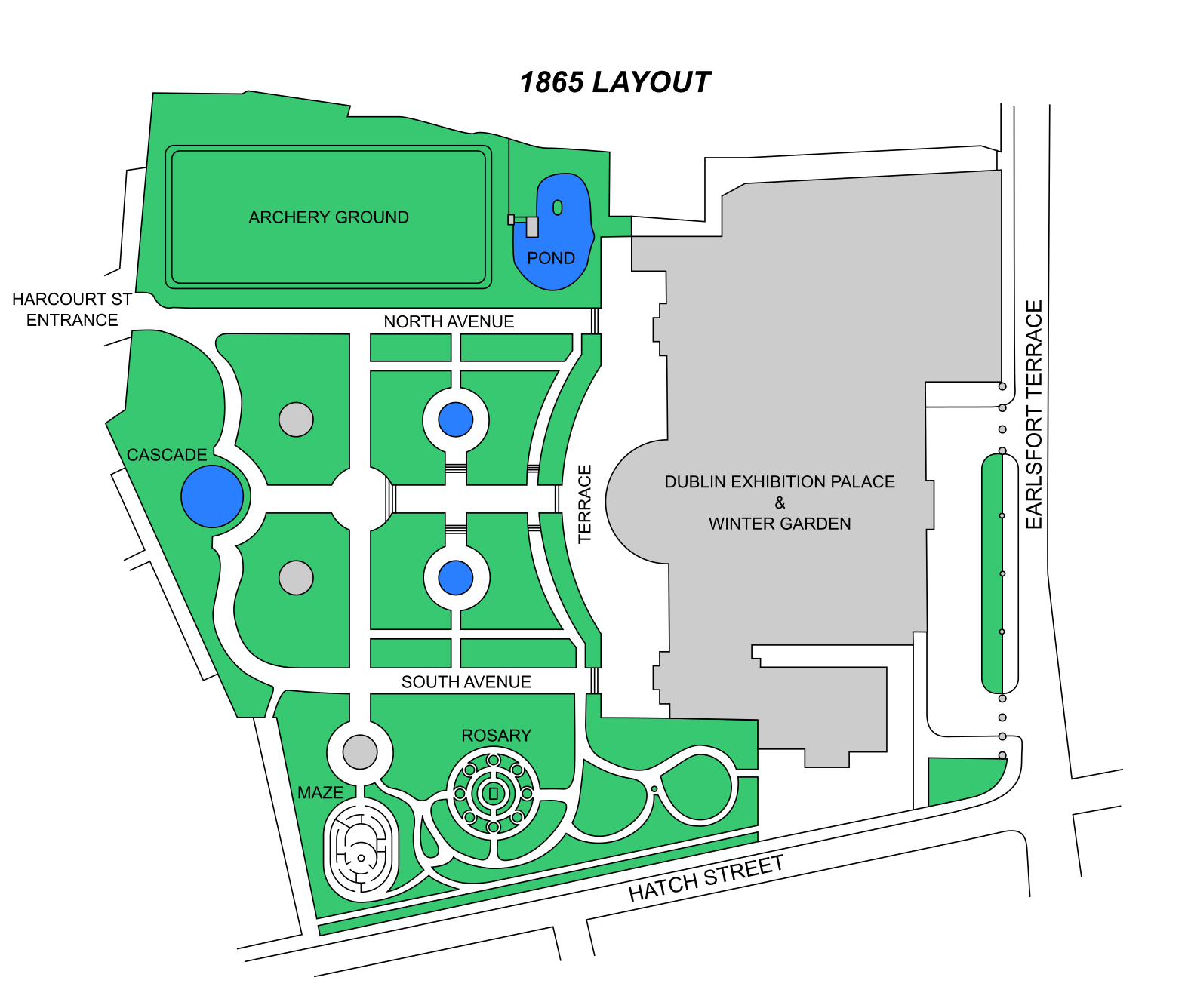
Plan of the Dublin Exhibition Palace and Winter Garden

In 1862, Sir Benjamin Lee Guinness co-founded the Dublin Exhibition Palace and Winter Garden Company (Limited), with the intention of "providing a permanent exhibition of Irish arts and manufactures and also reading rooms, flower gardens, and a gas-lit winter garden, for public enjoyment" modeled on the Crystal Palace of Sydenham. He sold the 17-acre site to the company for the price he had paid for it. The site was selected as the location for the Dublin Exhibition Palace and Winter Garden, which was officially opened by H.R.H. Albert Edward, Prince of Wales, on 9 May 1865.

=== Reversion to private ownership by the Guinness family ===
In 1870, Sir Benjamin Lee's sons, Edward Cecil Guinness (later Lord Iveagh) and Arthur Edward Guinness (later Lord Ardilaun), re-acquired the buildings and grounds from the Dublin Exhibition Palace Company. In 1872, the site was used for an Exhibition of Irish arts and manufactures, however, this was not a success and the gardens reverted to private ownership. The Winter Gardens were sold in 1882 and removed to England. In 1883, Edward Cecil Guinness sold the exhibition buildings to the Commissioners of Public Works to be adapted to house the new Royal University, and the gardens remained the property of the Guinness family. The buildings were further adapted after the creation of University College Dublin (UCD), in 1908 and in 1918, the present façade to Earlsfort Terrace was erected to the designs of Rudolph Maximilian Butler.

=== Gift to the Irish nation ===
Éamon de Valera, who was then both Taoiseach and also chancellor of University College Dublin, initiated inquiries with The 2nd Earl of Iveagh as to whether he would sell Iveagh House and the gardens complex to the Irish state. On 8 June 1937, this request was declined. However, on 4 May 1939 Lord Iveagh wrote to Éamon de Valera offering the Iveagh complex by way of gift to the nation. Lord Iveagh had been concerned as to the future use of the site, and specified in his letter of offer to Éamon de Valera that the Iveagh Gardens remain "unbuilt on", as a "lung" for Dublin. On 17 May 1939 this gift was accepted by the Government and Éamon de Valera wrote to Rupert, Lord Iveagh. In 1941, the Gardens were re-united with the college buildings of Earlsfort Terrace. However, there is, as of 2020, no public access to the former college buildings which are now buildings of the National Concert Hall and the planned children's science museum, Experimentation Station.

With the growth of student numbers at the university buildings, consideration was given in 1961 to building on the Iveagh Gardens. However, this did not occur and the university moved instead to Belfield, thereby saving the gardens.

=== Management by the Office of Public Works ===
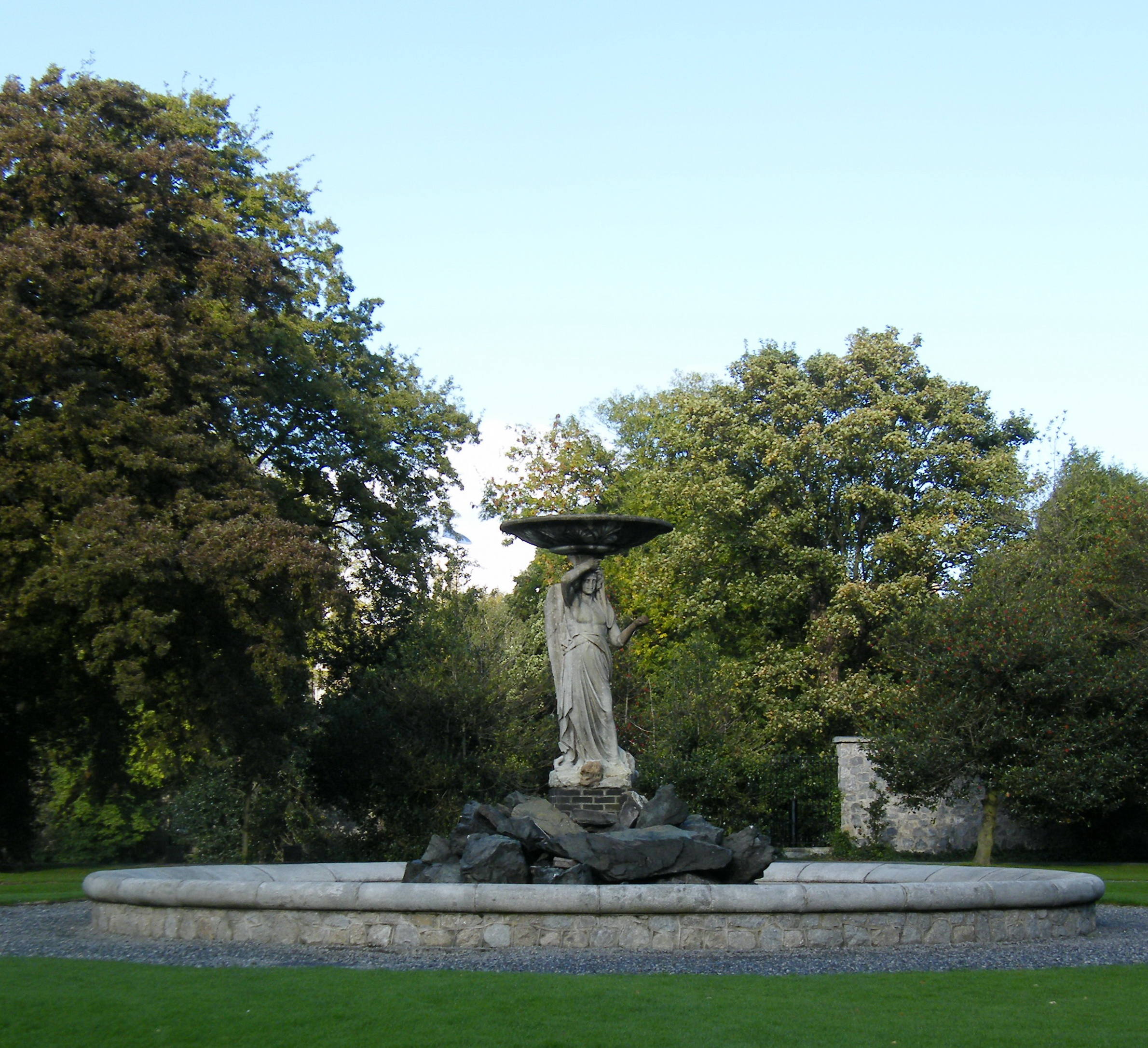
Statue in Gardens

In 1991 the gardens were placed under the management of The Office of Public Works. The OPW brief was under six distinct headings:

- to conserve and restore a unique city-centre park, which has remained largely unaltered since its layout by the landscape architect Ninian Niven;
- to improve public accessibility by constructing a new entrance from Hatch Street;
- to focus attention on one of Ireland's most influential landscape architects and horticulturists, Ninian Niven, by conserving one of his few surviving landscape creations;
- to conserve the internal and perimeter vegetation to screen out adjacent office blocks and buildings;
- to highlight the large range of landscape features for public enjoyment and landscape appreciation; and
- to restore these gardens creating a major tourist attraction offering a unique landscape not available in other city parks and gardens in Dublin.

A major restoration of the gardens to return them to their original state commenced in 1992 and they opened again to the public in 1992. The waterfall or cascade was allocated IR£200,000 in 1996 for its restoration.

In 2003, a new entrance was added to the Gardens from Upper Hatch Street.

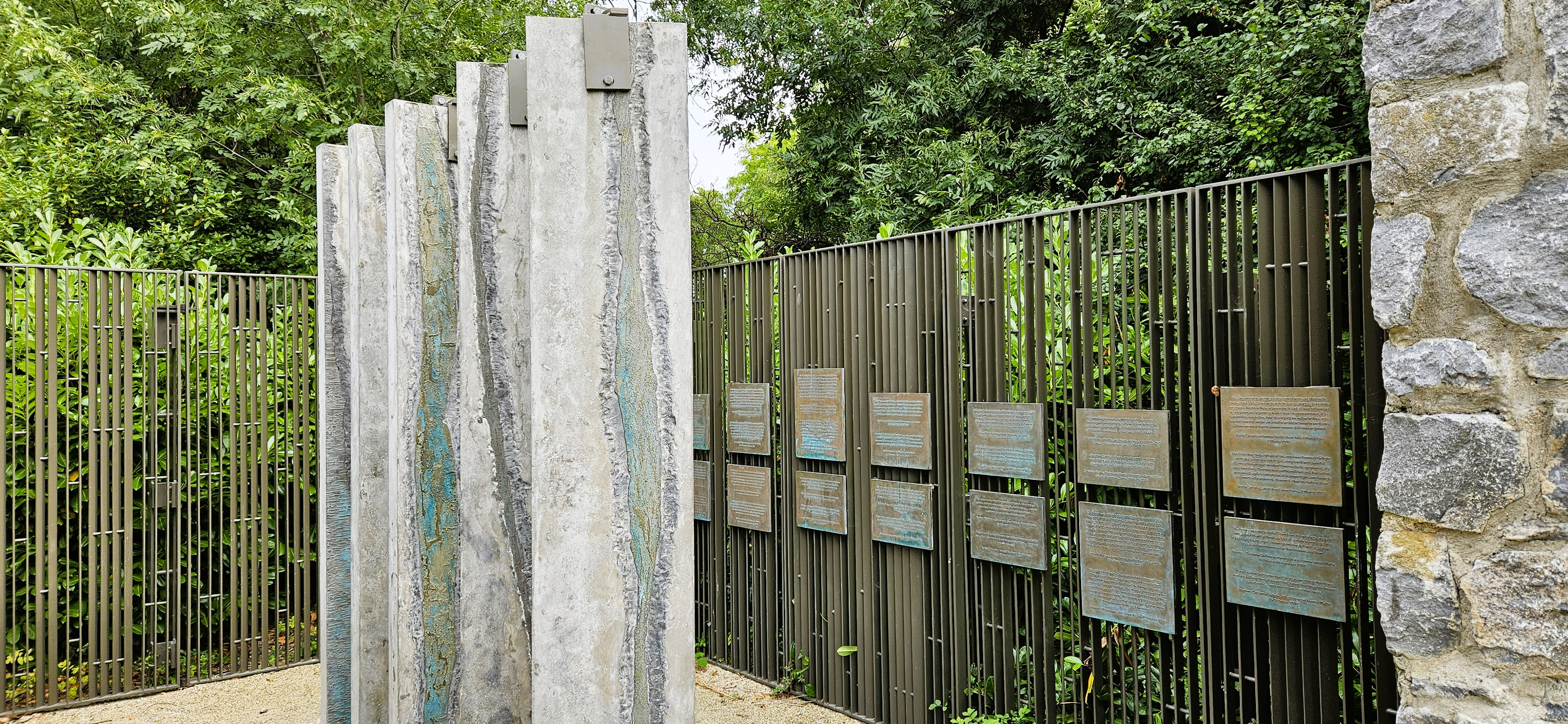
Memorial to Human Rights Defenders

On 9 December 2020, the Memorial to Human Rights Defenders was inaugurated by Minister for Foreign Affairs, Simon Coveney T.D.

== Design ==
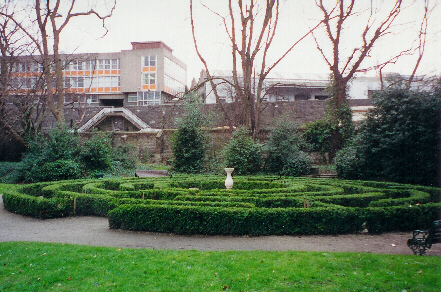
Iveagh Garden Maze

The gardens in their present form were designed by Ninian Niven, in 1865, as an intermediate design between the 'French Formal' and the 'English Landscape' styles.

=== Key features ===
- A large sunken lawn located near the Earlsfort Terrace entrance is one of only two purpose-built archery fields in Ireland. At its eastern end was a pond and boating tower. The tower now stands inside the boundary wall of Iveagh House. Beneath this lawn lie the remains of an elephant from Dublin Zoo, which was buried there in 1922.
- The cascade, or waterfall, flows over an immense rockery, with rocks from each of Ireland's 32 counties. The cascade uses recycled water today but originally used water from the Grand Canal.
- The maze, which is a miniature copy of London's Hampton Court Maze.
- The gardens host a number of damaged and broken classical statues of gods and naiads including one of Neptune and Venus.
