= National Botanic Gardens, Kilmacurragh =

Garden and arboretum in County Wicklow, Ireland

- Garraithe Náisiúnta na Lus Cill Mochura
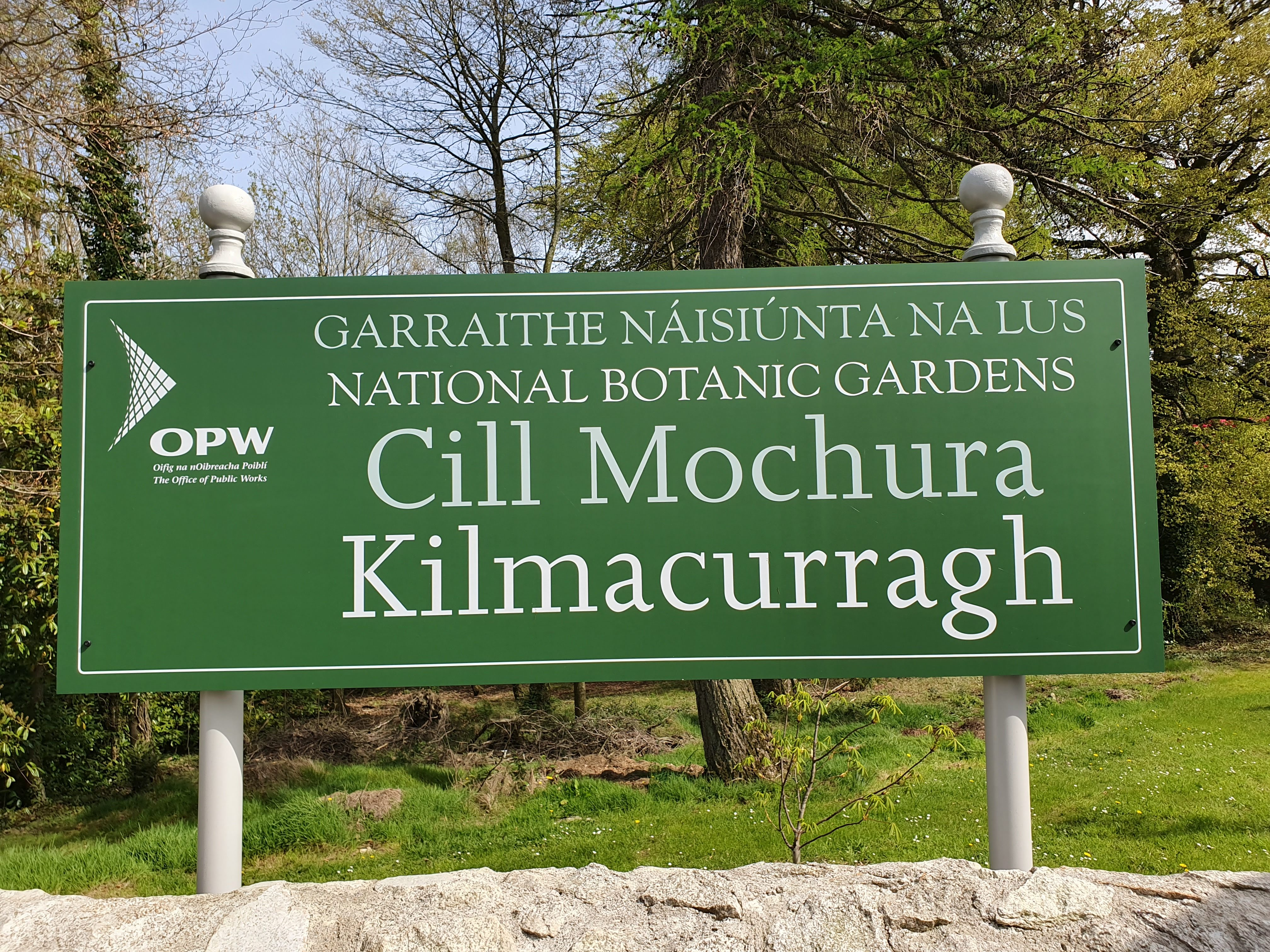
- Interactive map of National Botanic Gardens, Kilmacurragh
- Type: Botanic Garden
- Location: Kilmacurragh, Wicklow
- Coordinates: 52.929327°N 6.147796°W
- Area: 21.04 ha (52.0 acres)
- Created: 1712
- Operator: Office of Public Works
- Status: Open all year
- Website: www.botanicgardens.ie/kilmacurragh

The National Botanic Gardens, Kilmacurragh (Irish: Garraithe Náisiúnta na Lus, Cill Mochura) is a garden and arboretum outside Wicklow Town, County Wicklow, Ireland. It is a satellite of the main National Botanic Gardens located in Glasnevin, County Dublin. The 52 acre gardens are situated 5 km from exit 18 on the M11 motorway.

The gardens were founded in 1712 as part of the Acton family estate who owned the land until 1940. Today, the gardens are in State ownership through the Office of Public Works. They were acquired in 1976 by the Land commissioner and day-to-day management transferred to National Botanic Gardens in 1996.

== Earlier History ==
The story of Kilmacurragh stretches back beyond the establishment of the gardens to early Christian times when Saint Mochorog established a hermitage in the 7th century. A lake, part of which remains as a small pond, once existed as a fishing pond for a monastery that stood where the remains of the Acton family home stand today. This monastery was dissolved by Henry VII and the lands gifted to Thomas Acton I in lieu of wages.

Thomas Acton II (1655-1750) tore down the remaining monastery buildings in 1697 and used the stone to build the centrepiece Queen Anne style house. This house was one of the first unfortified houses of the time in County Wicklow and, while today it is in ruins, it is one of the few remaining early panelled houses in Ireland.

Thomas Acton III (1742-1817) inherited the estate in 1779 and decided to change the name of the estate from Kilmacurra to West Aston in 1750. When Thomas Acton IV inherited the Estate in 1854, he reverted his grandfathers name change and changed the estate’s name to Kilmacurragh, misspelling the original Kilmacurra.

Thomas Acton IV and his sister Jane Acton were behind establishment of the current gardens. By the time they inherited the estate, it was over 150 years old, they quickly set about modernising it. The subscribing to plant hunting expeditions and utilising contacts in botanical gardens and nurseries around the globe to acquire exotic seeds for the gardens. The gardens were the showpiece of the rare Irish Queen Anne style house, the home of the Acton family.

The Rhododendron walks were developed through a friendship with David Moore the curator of the National Botanic Garden's at Glasnevin. This led to Kilmacurragh becoming the home to the national rhododendron collection.

Further Kilmacurragh, whose acidic brown soil, low rainfall and mild winters, become the home of many specimens that were struggling or failing at Glasnevin. Many of the species grown in the gardens are so rare that they may be the only one or two of their kind in Europe or even the Northern Hemisphere.

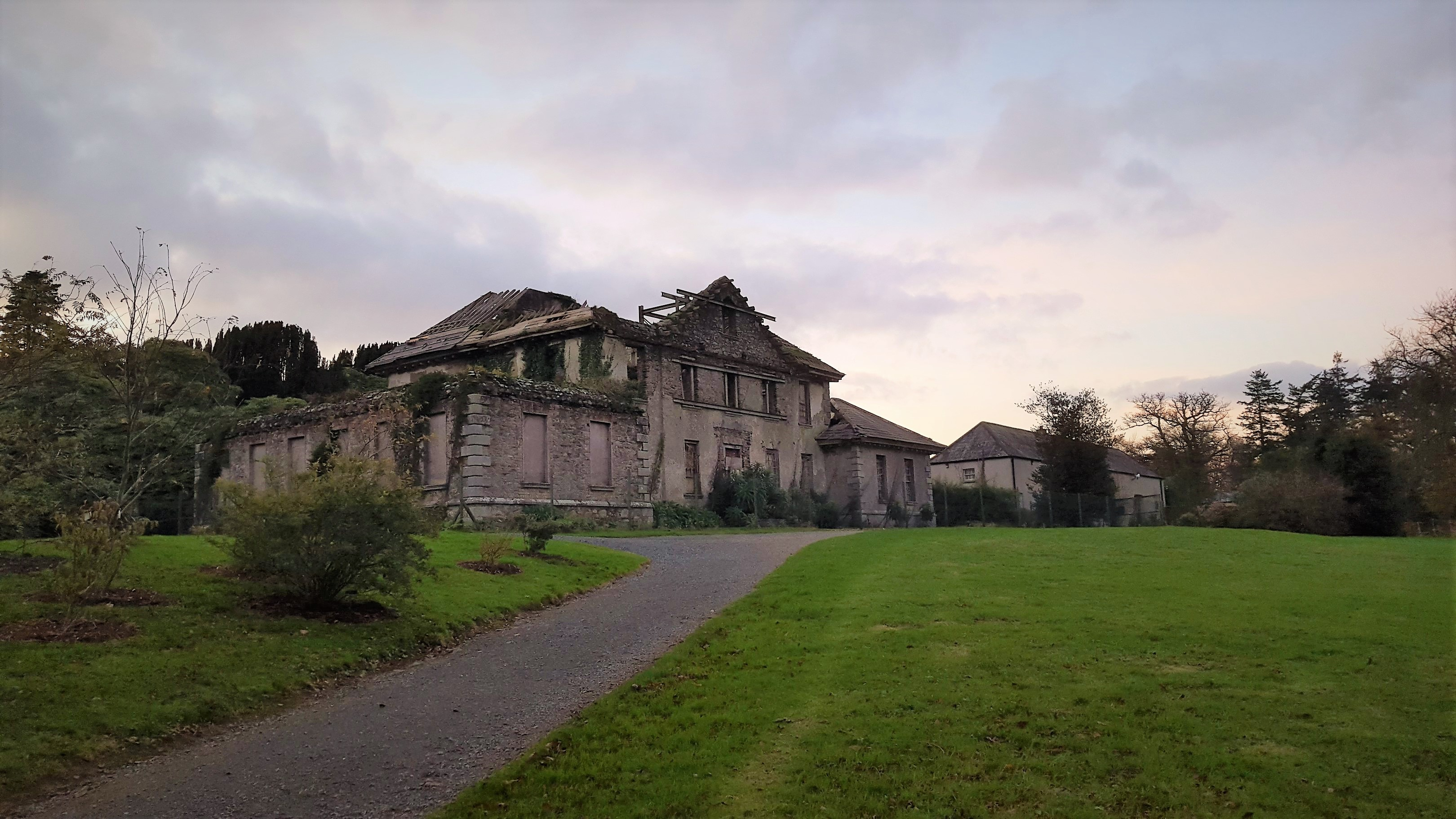
The remains of the Acton family home in National Botanic Gardens Kilmacurragh

These rare species include

- Monkey puzzles (conservation status endangered)
- Chilean Laurel
- Tiger-tailed spruce
- Wellingtonia tree
- Campbell's magnolia
- Mexican cypress

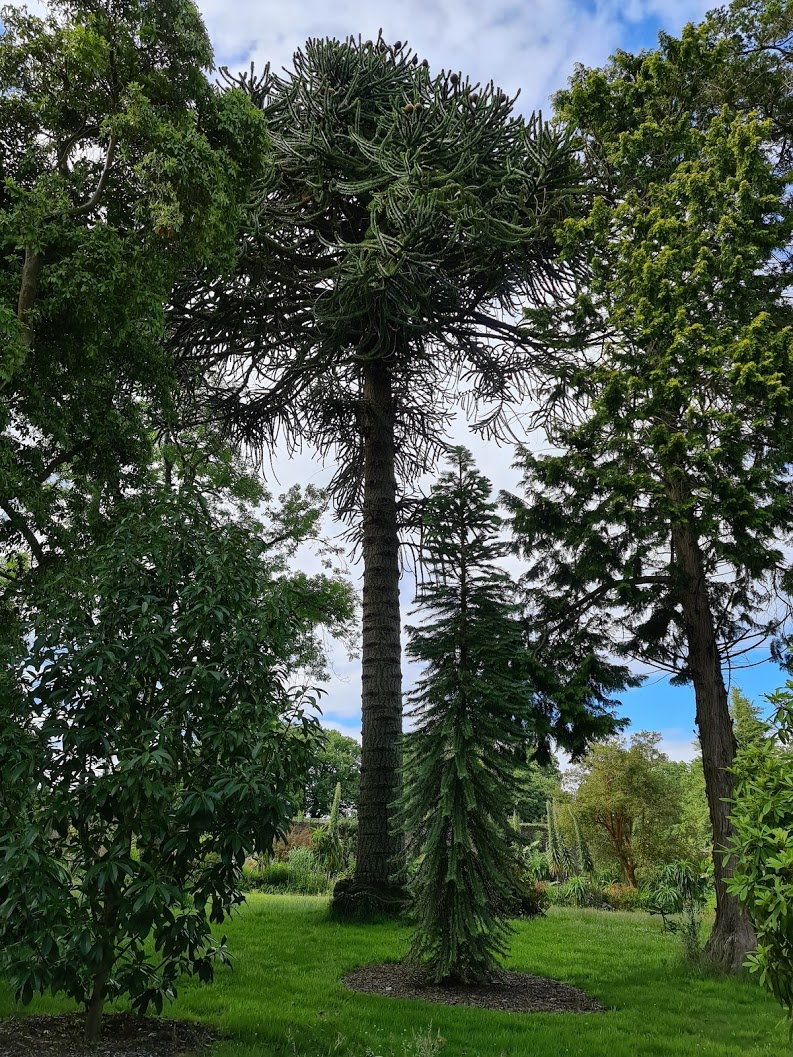
Mature monkey puzzle tree in the gardens.

The house was abandoned in the 1920s but was later run as Kilmacurragh Park Hotel by Charles Budina. An ownership dispute led to the abandonment of the gardens until it was acquired by the Irish state in 1976.

== Recent History ==
In 2006, Séamus O’Brien took on the position of head gardner for the gardens. He spear headed the transformation of the gardens and the rhododendron walks back to former glory after the grounds had fallen into neglect over the previous few decades. He also led the charge on plans for an additional 55 acres of former estate lands, which included the walled garden and the historic eighteenth-century deer park, that had been managed by Coillte but were acquired the OPW in 2019.

In 2021 it was announced that funds would be made available to restore the house under the national development plan and in late 2023, planning permission was granted for these plans which will include reinstatement of the building's roof, restoration of its windows and doors, and the conservation of the external wall finishes. On December 9th, 2025 the OPW announced they had appointed Kelbuild Ltd to complete the work to restore and preserve the House with €6.5m funded towards the project.

On 22nd December 2025, the gardens announced that Séamus had passed away unexpectedly, aged 55, at his home in the Kilmacurragh estate.

== Facilities ==
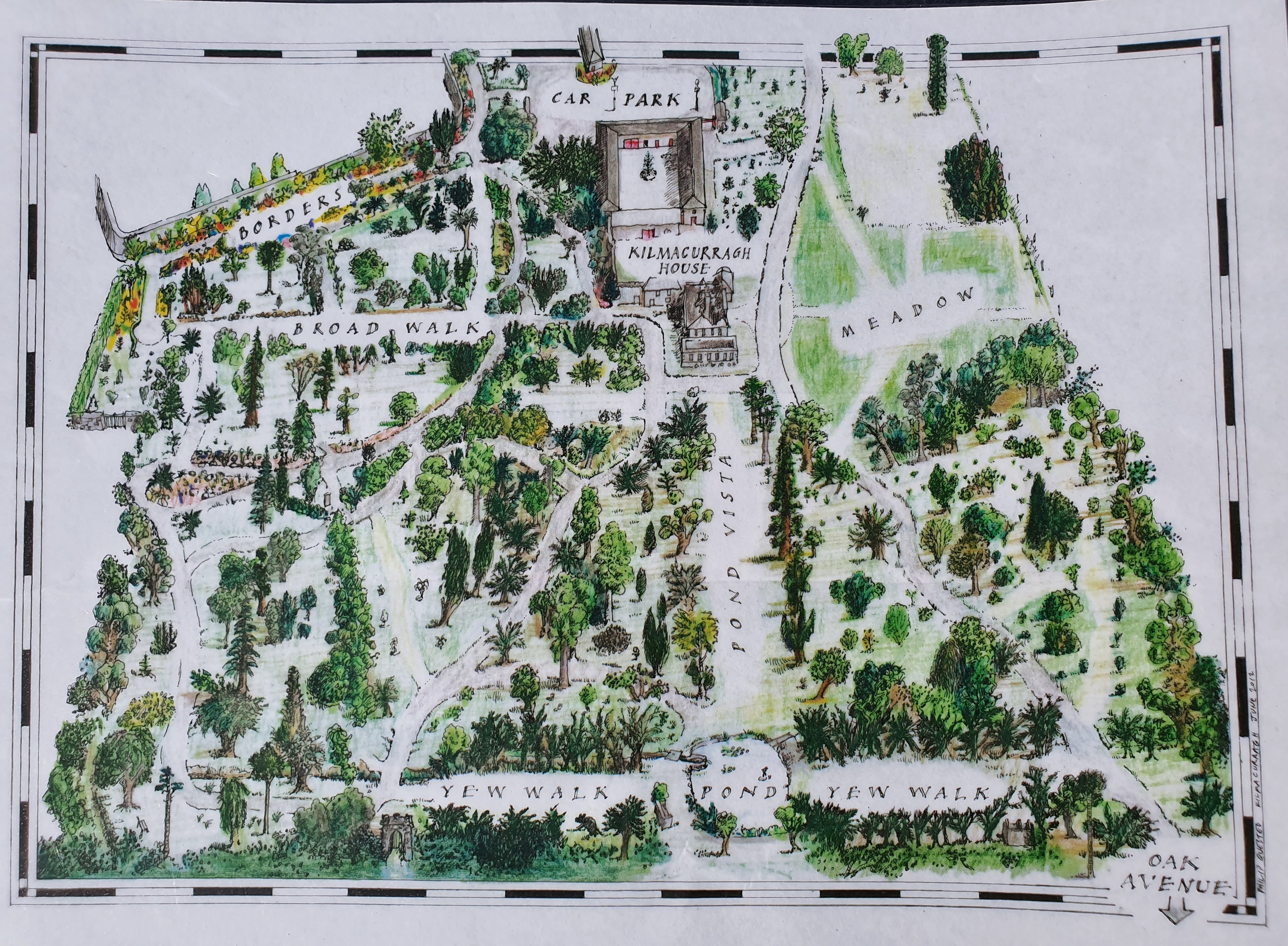
Map of Kilmacurragh National Botanic Gardens

A café, Actons, opened in 2015 in one of the restored courtyard buildings on site. During the summer months there are free guided tours by the team working to restore and replant the gardens.

== See also ==
- List of botanical gardens in Ireland
