= Alexander Goodman More =

British naturalist

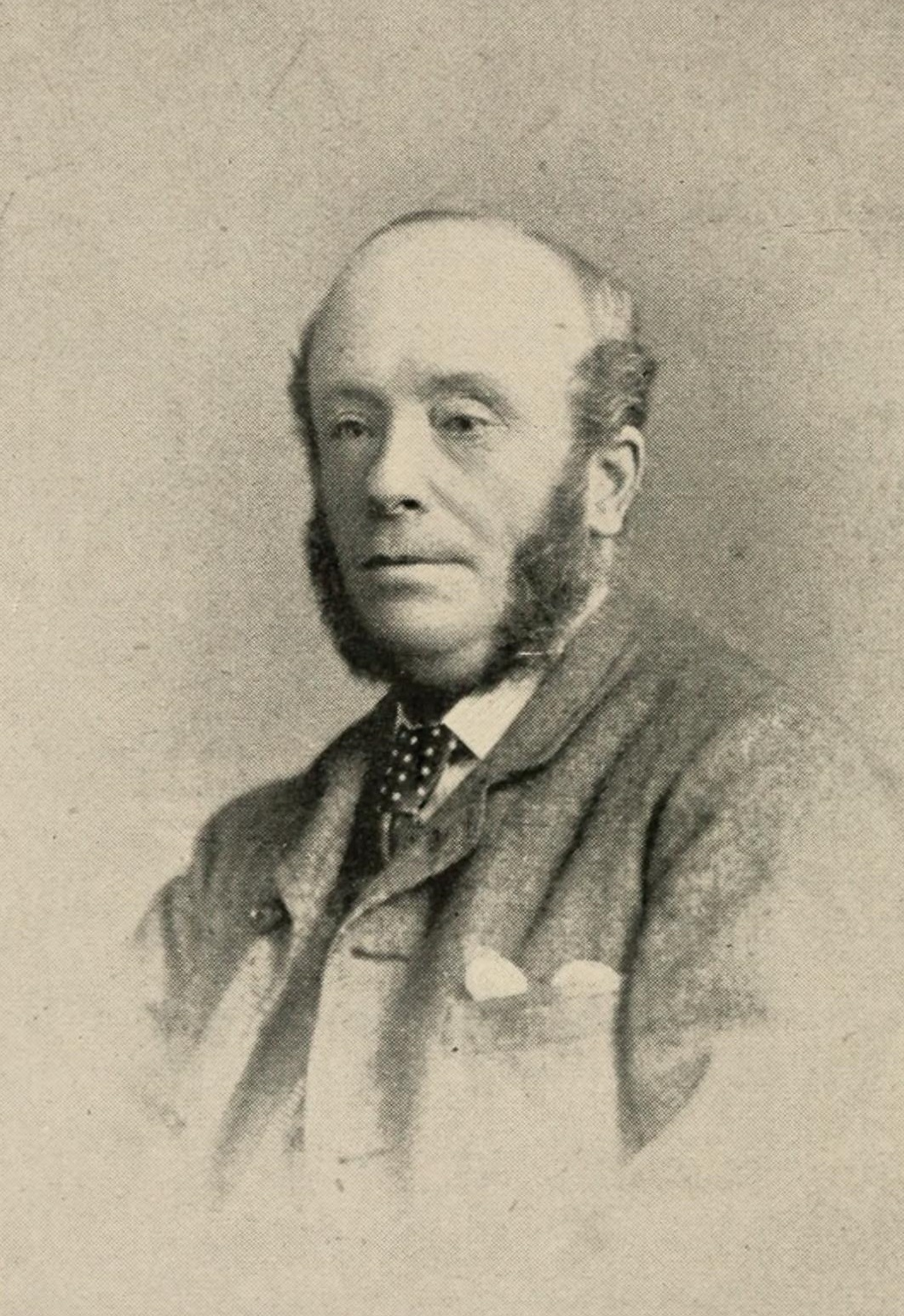

Alexander Goodman More FRSE FLS MRIA (5 September 1830 – 22 March 1895) was a British naturalist.

== Life ==
Born in London, More was educated at Rugby School, and matriculated at Trinity College, Cambridge in 1850. He did not graduate, however, though he remained at Trinity until 1855: periods of illness interrupted his studies. He did make contact with a number of botanists and ornithologists there. He occupied himself with natural history.

In 1866, in conjunction with David Moore, he published "an excellent account on the geographical distribution of plants in Ireland," titled Contributions towards a Cybele Hibernica.

From 1867 to 1887 he was Curator of the Natural History Museum of the Royal Dublin Society.

In 1887 he was elected a Fellow of the Royal Society of Edinburgh. His proposers were Alexander Dickson, Ramsay Heatley Traquair, Robert Gray and Alexander Buchan.

== Publications ==
- Cybele Hibernica (1866), with David Moore.
- On the Distribution of Birds in Great Britain (1865)
