= David Moore (botanist born 1808) =

Scottish botanist

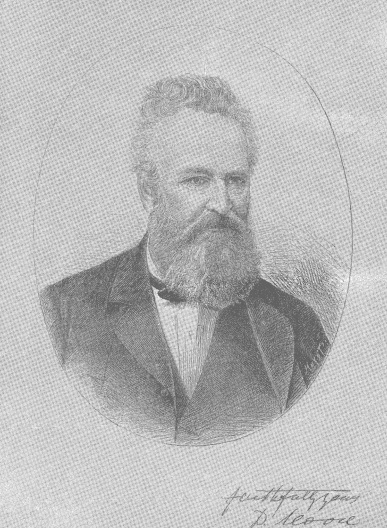
- Born: 23 April 1808; Dundee, Scotland
- Died: 9 June 1879 (aged 71); Glasnevin, Dublin, Ireland
- Other name: David Muir
- Scientific career
- Fields: Botany
- Workplaces: National Botanic Gardens, Ireland

David Moore born David Moir (23 April 1808 – 9 June 1879) was a Scottish botanist who served as director of the Irish National Botanic Gardens for over 40 years.

== Early life ==
David Moir was born in Dundee, Scotland on 23 April 1808. His parents were Charles, a gardener, and Helen Moir (née Rattray). He was one of 9 children, with 7 surviving to adulthood. He had 5 brothers and one sister. The family changed their name from Moir to Moore in 1830. Moore sometimes went by the name David Muir. He was known to hide his Scottish origins, but not his accent. He received his initial botanical training from conservator of the Dundee Rational Institution Museum, Douglas Gardiner. He then became an apprentice at the Earl of Camperdown near Dundee under the head gardener Mr Howe, later working at James Cunningham's nursery, Edinburgh.

== Career in Ireland ==
In November 1828 he migrated to Ireland and became foreman and assistant to James Townsend Mackay in the Trinity College Botanic Gardens in Dublin. After the death of Moore's mother in 1832, his brother Charles joined him as an apprentice. While working under Mackay, Moore developed an interest in Irish flora which led him to being appointed to the Ordnance Survey as botanist in 1833. Over the next 4 years, he surveyed Counties Antrim and Londonderry, which lead him to writing his memoir, Ordnance survey of the county of Londonderry (1837). During these surveys he discovered the narrow small-reed Calamagrostis stricta, and the club-sedge Carex buxbaumii, which are now both extinct in the wild. He also recorded a number of other plants in Ireland for the first time.

In 1838 he returned to Dublin and was appointed director of the Royal Dublin Society's botanic garden at Glasnevin, County Dublin, succeeding Ninian Niven. Moore remained in this post until his death. In this role, he travelled widely in the United Kingdom and Europe collecting rarer and unusual specimens for the Gardens. He also took specimen donations including many from his brother Charles in Australia. He became an authority on cryptograms, publishing on liverworts and mosses. He developed an interest in orchids, and under his supervision orchids were germinated from seed for the first time in Ireland between 1845 and 1849. During his tenure, he also oversaw the renewal of the Garden's glass houses, and amassed a collection of insectivorous plants.

Moore was director during the Great Famine, and conducted research into the potato blight which caused successive potato crops to fail across Ireland. He confirmed the disease was caused by a fungus, and not atmospheric conditions as had been previously thought. Having heard reports of the blight in 1845, his observations of the disease affecting potatoes in the Botanic Gardens on 20 August 1845 are the first verified record of the disease in Ireland. He experimented unsuccessfully in treating the disease.

In 1864 he was awarded a PhD from the University of Zurich. He was awarded two gold medals by the Royal Horticultural Society of Tuscany in 1874. He served as an advisory commissioner to the Paris exhibition in 1867, and as a juror on the Botanical and Horticultural Congress in Saint Petersburg in 1869. He was elected an associate of the Linnaean Society in 1841 and later a fellow in 1861. He was elected a member of the Royal Irish Academy in 1845. He was also a member of the Imperial Zoological and Botanical Society of Vienna, and a corresponding member of the Natural Society of Strasbourg.

The Botanic Gardens were moved from the control of the Royal Dublin Society to the government Department of Science and Art in 1878, with Moore remaining in his post as director. His relationship with his superiors, in particular Professor William McNab, became strained towards the end of his career. Moore believed that McNab was attempted to have him removed from his position so that he could replace him. Moore died at Glasnevin while still director, on 9 June 1879, following a bladder operation. His son, Frederick William Moore, succeeded him. Moore is buried at Mount Jerome cemetery, Dublin.

== Works ==
Moore published papers in The Phytologist, in the Natural History Review, in the Dublin University Zoological and Botanical Proceedings, in Leeman's Journal of Botany, in the Proceedings of the Royal Irish Academy, and in other periodicals. He worked mainly on mosses and hepaticæ, and published in 1873 a Synopsis of Mosses, and in 1876 a Report on Hepaticæ (Proceedings of Royal Irish Academy). He also wrote a guide book to the Botanic Gardens.

In 1866 Moore published, with Alexander Goodman More, Contributions towards a Cybele Hibernica, being Outlines of the Geographical Distribution of Plants in Ireland. It was begun in 1836, during his tenure with the Ordnance Survey. His final work was a description of a new species of Isoetes, which he named Isoetes morei after his friend More (Journal of Botany, 1878, p. 353).

The standard author abbreviation Moore is used to indicate this person as the author when citing a botanical name.

== Family ==
Moore married three times. His first marriage was to Hannah Bridgford of Spafield Nursery, Ballsbridge. Hannah died in Glasnevin of typhus in December 1840. They had two daughters. Moore's second wife, Isabella, died in 1847 from either typhus or dysentery. They were also thought to have had two children. However, there are no further records of Moore's first four children from these marriages. Moore married a third time on 7 December 1854, to Margaret Baker. They had 2 daughters and 3 sons.
