= Frederick William Moore =

- Moore in 1921
- Born: 3 September 1857; Glasnevin, Ireland
- Died: 23 August 1949 (aged 91); Rathfarnham
- Known for: Keeper of the Royal Botanical Gardens, Dublin
- Scientific career
- Fields: botany
- Author abbrev. (botany): F.W.Moore

Sir Frederick William Moore (3 September 1857 Glasnevin – 23 August 1949 Ballybrack), was President of the Royal Horticultural Society of Ireland, and Keeper of the Royal Botanical Gardens, Dublin in the period 1879-1922.

== Early life ==
He was the eldest son of David Moore, then curator of the botanic gardens, and his third wife, Margaret Baker (1833/4–1917). The family included four other children, two girls and two boys. Frederick was singled out by his father for a career in horticulture, and was accordingly encouraged to study botany. Frederick and his younger brother, David Francis (Frank), were sent to a school in Hanover in 1869. Frederick became a frequent visitor to the Herrenhausen Gardens and befriended the director Herman Wendland. Three years in Germany made the boys fluent in German and French, but their English suffered. Frederick enrolled at the Royal School, Armagh, and later in October 1873 as an occasional student in the Royal College of Science, Dublin, following courses in chemistry, geology, descriptive geometry, and surveying. He successfully wrote the entrance examinations for the Indian Forest Service, but was not chosen for training.

== Career ==
In February 1875 Moore started as an unpaid apprentice at Louis van Houtte's nursery in Ghent, and while there attended the nursery's school of horticulture. After fifteen months he relocated to the Hortus Botanicus Leiden. He attended lectures in botany under Professor Willem Suringar, also exploring local nurseries and joining the university rowing club. In October 1876 he was offered the position of head gardener at the botanic garden at Trinity College Dublin. He took up the position a month later and managed the 6 acre botanic garden at Ballsbridge for some three years.

On his father's death in June 1879, Moore sought to be appointed to the vacant post at the Royal Botanic Gardens at Glasnevin. He was supported in his bid by a number of Dublin newspapers, and took up the post of curator on 9 September 1879, retaining this office for forty-three years; this title changed to keeper in 1890.

During his tenure he saw to the erection of glasshouses to accommodate the expanding collections of tropical orchids, insectivorous plants, ferns, palms, and cycads. The Garden became notable for its extensive orchid collection, particularly small-flowered species, many of which were new to science, such as Neomoorea, named in his honour. Artists, such as Lydia Shackleton (1828–1914), were commissioned to illustrate the orchids, resulting in a large collection of botanical watercolours. Moore's interests in plants were wide, and included developing many garden-worthy cultivars.

In 1898 Moore started a gardening course for women at Glasnevin, later including 'gentlemen gardeners'. The botanical garden significantly influenced other gardens in Ireland. Moore's aim was to distribute new plants to gardens in regions where climate and soil were more congenial. Gardens, such as Mount Usher in County Wicklow and Headfort in county Meath, gained an enormous number of hardy, new plants from botanical expeditions to China.

Unlike his father Frederick's interests didn't lie in the study of Ireland's native flora, but rather in practical horticulture. He was content to leave the identification and description of new plants to the botanists of the Royal Botanic Gardens, Kew, and the British Museum (Natural History), London. He also did not publish any important papers, and rarely lectured, although frequently speaking at meetings of the societies of which he was a member. While he did not participate in public horticultural controversies of the time, he held strong opinions. He was known for his tact, courtesy, and generosity, with a profound knowledge of plants and horticulture.

By the 1890s Moore was widely acknowledged as Ireland's foremost horticulturist. He made frequent visits to London and the shows of the Royal Horticultural Society, also attending any important horticultural events in Europe. In 1897 he was chosen with sixty other persons to receive the Victoria Medal of Honour from the Royal Horticultural Society. He also received a knighthood for services to horticulture, from George V on 11 July 1911, and an honorary doctorate of science from the University of Dublin in June 1939.

Moore had a keen interest in rugby and was selected on four occasions between 1884 and 1886 to play for Ireland, against Wales, England, and Scotland, and served as president of the Irish Rugby Football Union for 1889–90. Other outdoor activities of his were hunting, riding and rowing. He was elected a member of the Royal Irish Academy (1887), the Royal Dublin Society (1891), associate of the Linnean Society of London (1894), and fellow of the Linnean Society (1911). He was also president of the Royal Zoological Society of Ireland (1917–22). He was a commissioner of Irish lights (1921–49). Moore was most active with the Royal Horticultural Society of Ireland, serving as chairman of its council (1904–6), honorary secretary (1906–45), and president (1945–8), and was awarded its gold medal of honour in 1939.
