= Royal Horticultural Society of Ireland =

- Abbreviation: RHSI
- Formation: 30 September 1816; 209 years ago
- Type: Registered charity
- Purpose: Promote gardening and horticulture
- Region served: Ireland
- President: Peter Harrison
- Website: www.rhsi.ie

The Royal Horticultural Society of Ireland (RHSI), founded in 1816, is Ireland's leading gardening charity.

== History ==
The Society was founded in 1816 as a charitable organization, "to Protect and Promote the Science of Gardening in Ireland". The inaugural meeting took place on 30 September 1816 at the Rose Tavern, Donnybrook, Dublin, with Francis Caulfeild, 2nd Earl of Charlemont, as first president and Francis Hetherington, who was his head gardener, as first chairman. The name adopted was the Horticultural Society of Ireland. The new society held its first flower show on Easter Monday 1817 and then a further flower and fruit show on 18 August 1817. After a number of shows in the following years, the society declined, but in 1830 it was re-invigorated with a new committee.

At an extraordinary general meeting on 9 August 1838, the society received a letter from the Home Secretary, Lord John Russell, addressed to Augustus FitzGerald, 3rd Duke of Leinster, in which he reported that Queen Victoria had accepted an invitation to become the society’s Patroness and that she had given permission for the name Royal Horticultural Society of Ireland to be used. The new name was adopted with immediate effect.

In 2016, the RHSI celebrated its 200th anniversary. In November 2023, it announced a consultation with its members which could lead to an extraordinary general meeting to consider dropping the word 'Royal' from its name. This meeting took place in June 2024, when the members voted to keep the society's name unchanged, on the basis of the cost of changing it.

The membership is now made up of both professional and amateur gardeners.

== RHSI Bellefield ==
In 2021, Angela Jupe, an architect and garden designer, left her house and gardens at Bellefield, Shinrone, County Offaly, to the RHSI. The property includes cottages and a walled garden of two acres with important collections of trees, bulbs, and perennials. Open weekends take place throughout the year, and entrance is free to RHSI members.

== Presidents ==
- 1816–1838: Francis Caulfeild, 2nd Earl of Charlemont
- 1838–1874: Augustus FitzGerald, 3rd Duke of Leinster
- 1874–1877: Charles FitzGerald, 4th Duke of Leinster
- 1877–1893: Gerald FitzGerald, 5th Duke of Leinster
- 1894–1915: Arthur Guinness, Lord Ardilaun
- 1915–1943: Geoffrey Taylour, 4th Marquess of Headfort
- 1945–1948: Sir Frederick Moore
- 1948–1949: Robert Lloyd Praeger
- 1950–1952: Phyllis, Lady Moore
- 1953–1955: G. O. Sherrard
- 1956–1958: Richard Grove Annesley
- 1959–1969: Michael Parsons, 6th Earl of Rosse
- 1970–1973: W. Morris Hutton
- 1973–1978: Ralph J. Walker
- 1978–1983: Sidney Maskell
- 1983–1988: Keith Lamb
- 1988–1993: P. A. X. Hackett
- 1993–1998: Rita Rutherford
- 1998–2001: George A. F. Harrison
- 2001–2006: Maria Prendiville
- 2006–2011: Maeve Kearns
- 2011–2019: Robert Myerscough
- 2019–2022: Brenda Branigan
- 2022– : Peter S. Harrison

== See also ==
- Royal Horticultural Society
