= Hyndman =

Hyndman is a Scottish surname.

== Origins ==
The surname Hyndman has two origins. First, it may be an occupational surname, either from hind 'farm labourer' + man, or a variant of hireman. Second, it may have originated from a nickname, possibly hende 'courteous' + man. Variant spellings include Hindman. Early records of bearers of the surname include a Hector Hyndman of Renfrewshire in the Exchequer Rolls of Scotland for 1553.

The Scottish Register of Tartans lists three tartans for families named Hyndman. Two are restricted tartans: one for the family of Captain Henry Hyndman (1785–1849), the son of an East India Company colonel who settled in Hong Kong; the other for the family of Daniel Hyndman in Edinburgh and Ontario. The third, created for C. P. Hyndman (stated to be "the first Hyndman to record arms in the Lyon Register since 1672"), has a design chosen to reflect his family's association with the Royal Inniskilling Fusiliers and the town of Paisley, and by C. P. Hyndman's wishes is available for all bearers of the surname born in Northern Ireland.

== Statistics ==
The 1881 United Kingdom census found 338 bearers of the surname Hyndman, primarily in the west of Scotland. Statistics compiled by Patrick Hanks on the basis of the 2011 United Kingdom census and 2011 Ireland census showed 718 bearers of the surname on the island of Great Britain and 367 on the island of Ireland. In the United States, the 2010 Census found 1,054 people with the surname Hyndman, making it the 23,943rd-most-common surname in the country. This represented an increase from 1,038 (22,999th-most-common) in the 2000 Census. In both censuses, roughly nine-tenths of people with this surname identified as non-Hispanic White, and roughly six percent as non-Hispanic Black or African American.

== People ==
- Abigail Hyndman (born 1990), British Virgin Islands beauty pageant titleholder
- Alex Hyndman (born 1978), British broadcast journalist
- Alicia Hyndman (born 1971), American education administrator and member of the New York State Assembly
- Alonzo Hyndman (1890–1940), Canadian physician and member of Parliament
- Bill Hyndman (1915–2001), American amateur golfer
- Catherine Hyndman (born 1990), Northern Irish footballer
- Cherry Crawford Hyndman (1768–1845), Belfast woman reputedly a member of the republican Society of United Irishmen
- Chris Hyndman (1966–2015), Canadian interior decorator and television personality
- Clint Hyndman (fl. 1990s–2010s), drummer for Australian band Something for Kate
- Emerson Hyndman (born 1996), American association football (soccer) player
- Frederick Walter Hyndman (1904–1995), Canadian insurance company executive and governor of Prince Edward Island
- George Crawford Hyndman (1796–1867), Irish auctioneer
- Harry Hyland Hyndman (1920–1963), Canadian politician, member of the Legislative Assembly of Ontario
- Henry Hyndman (1842–1921), English socialist theoretician
- James Hyndman (politician) (1874–1971), Canadian lawyer and justice of the Supreme Court of Alberta
- James Hyndman (actor) (born 1962), Canadian actor
- John Hyndman (1723–1762), Church of Scotland minister
- Karine Gonthier-Hyndman (born 1984), Canadian actress from Quebec
- Kelley Hyndman (born 1985), American tennis player
- Lou Hyndman (1935–2013), Canadian lawyer and member of the Legislative Assembly of Alberta
- Mike Hyndman (born 1945), Canadian ice hockey player
- Peter Hyndman (1941–2006), Canadian lawyer and member of the British Columbia Legislative Assembly
- Rob J. Hyndman (born 1967), Australian statistician
- Robert Stewart Hyndman (1915–2009), Canadian painter
- Schellas Hyndman (born 1951), American association football (soccer) coach
- William Hyndman (baseball) (1854–1920), American baseball player
