= George Crawford Hyndman =

Irish auctioneer and amateur biologist

- Born: 1796
- Died: 1867 (aged 70–71)
- Occupations: Botany, Zoology

George Crawford Hyndman (1796–1867) was an Irish auctioneer and amateur biologist.

He was the son of Cherry Crawford Hyndman (1766-1845) and James Hyndman (1761?–1825), a Belfast Woollen merchant. Both parents, in the 1790s, were active in the republican Society of United Irishmen. In heavily garrisoned Belfast, neither appear to have been implicated in the 1798 rebellion, but, for whatever reason, James Hyndman did not join other merchants and local dignitaries in signing a proclamation published just before the risings to the north and south of the town in June, which expressed support for the government.

George was educated at the Belfast Academy until apprenticed to his father’s business at age 14. After his father died in 1825, he took the business over while devoting his leisure time to Irish natural history. He was particularly interested in the study of marine zoology and marine botany, especially molluscs and algae. His specimens of both groups may now be found in the Ulster Museum.

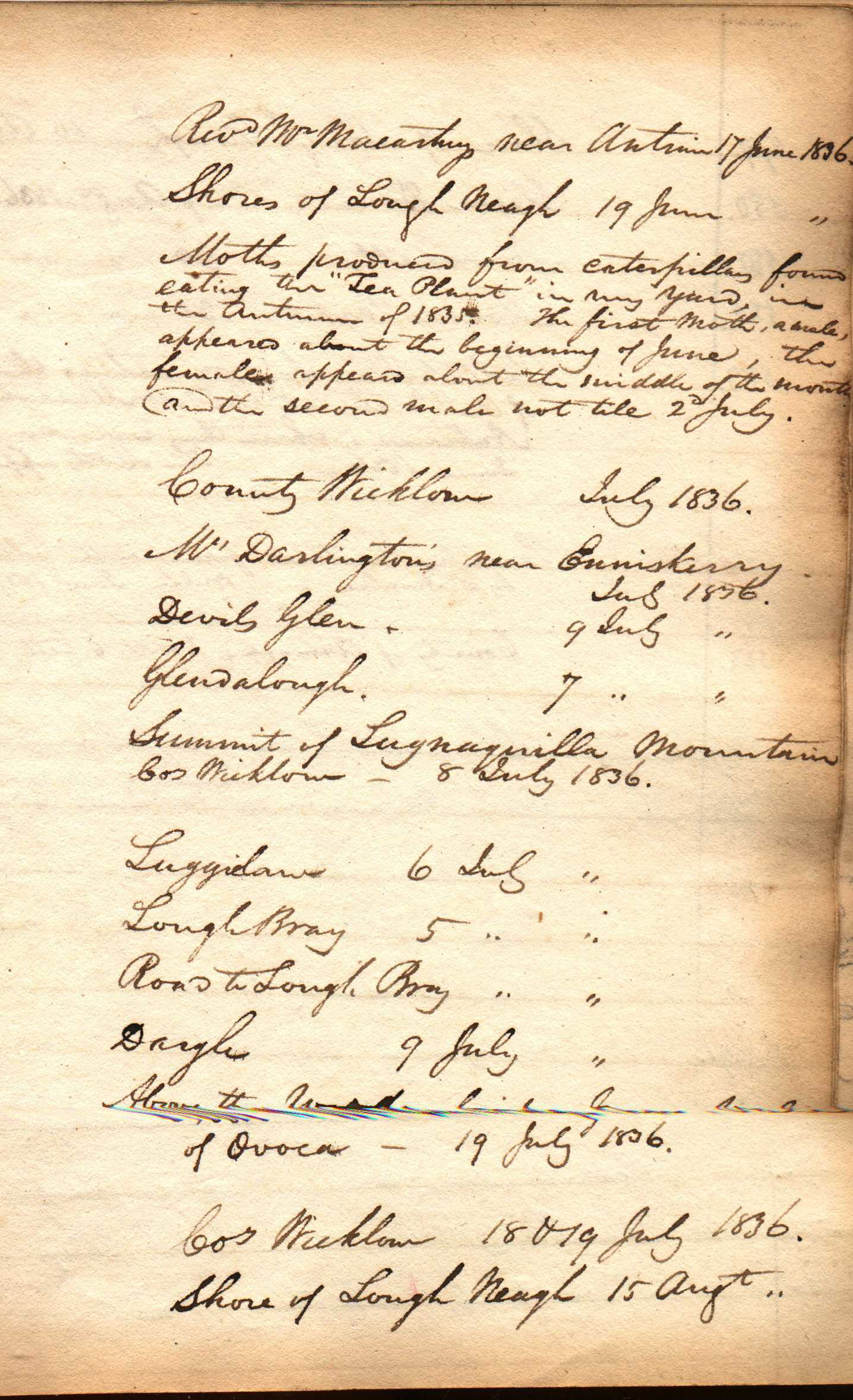
Hyndman's insect diary

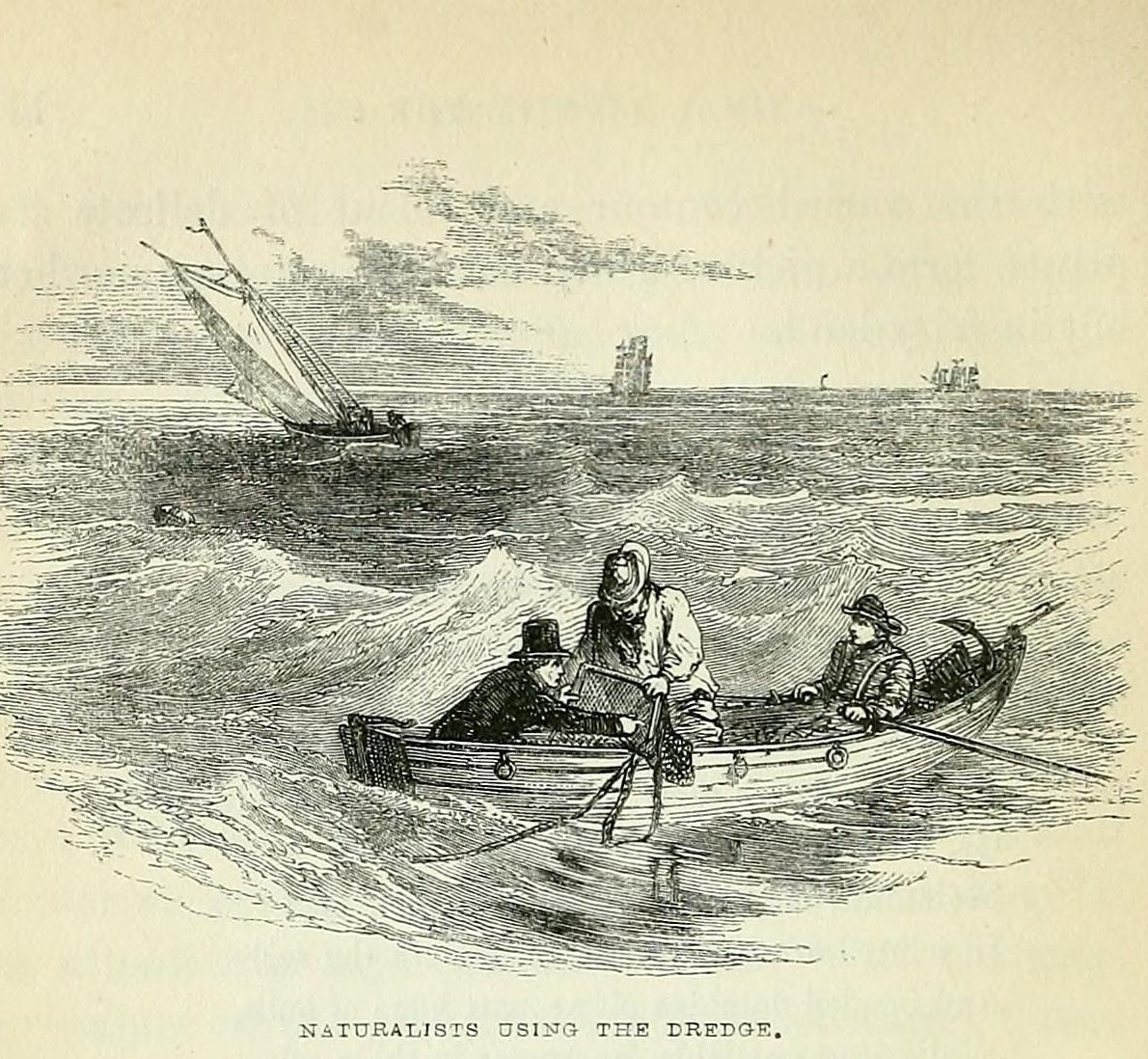
Dredging for marine animals in 1849

Hyndman was a member of the Belfast Dredging Committee (other members were George Dickie, Edward Waller and John Gwyn Jeffreys). This operated from 1857 to 1859, under grants from the British Association for the Advancement of Science. He was a founder member of the Belfast Natural History Society. He contributed to S. A. Stewart and T. H. Corry's Flora of the North-east.

== Legacy ==
William Thompson named the Panningia hyndmani, a hermit crab for him as the discoverer in Belfast Lough.

Anapagurus hyndmanni (Bell, 1845) and A. laevis and Pagurus cuanensis were also discovered by Hyndman at Portaferry (and Bangor) and named by Thompson without formal descriptions.

Other hermit crab species named for Hyndman were:

- Escharina hyndmanni (Johnson, 1847)
- Iophon hyndmani (Bowerbank, 1858)
- Pseudione hyndmanni (Bate & Westwood, 1868).

The Ulster Museum has an 1854-62 archive of George Crawford Hyndman containing 20 letters from Francis Archer, Edward Benn, J. Bristow, Edward Charlesworth (1813–93) an English naturalist and palaeontologist), A. Crawford, Robert Damon (1814-1889) Dorset geologist and dealer in fossils), George Dickie, Edmund Getty, John Gwyn Jeffreys, William Molony, William Hincks, J. Morpan, Robert Patterson, Edward Waller and Charles Ward.

== Works ==
- 1853 Notes on the natural history of Tory Island. Ulster Journal of Archaeology 1: 34–37.
- 1857 Note on a curious monstrosity of the common shell (Fusus antiquus). Nat. Hist. : 250.
- 1858 Report of the Proceedings of the Belfast Dredging Committee. Report for the British Association for the Advancement of Science : 220-237
- 1859 Report of the Belfast Dredging Committee. Report for the British Association for the Advancement of Science : 282-293
- 1860 Report of the Belfast Dredging Committee for 1859. Report for the British Association for the Advancement of Science : 116-119 (Committee joined by Charles Wyville Thomson.

Most of Hyndman's discoveries are published with attribution in Thompson, William (edited by Patterson, R.) The Natural History of Ireland Volume 4: Mammalia, reptiles and fishes. Also, invertebrata. London: Henry G. Bohn, 1856
