= Frank Archer =

Frank Archer may refer to:

- Frank B. Archer (1858–1914), American politician in Ohio
- Frank Archer (politician) (1846–1902), Tasmanian politician
- Frank Archer (Fullmetal Alchemist), a character in Fullmetal Alchemist

== See also ==
- Francis Archer (1803–1875), Irish physician and naturalist
