= William Braithwaite =

William Braithwaite may refer to:

- William Stanley Braithwaite (1878–1962), African-American writer, poet, literary critic, anthologist, and publisher
- William Charles Braithwaite (1862–1922), British historian
- William Garnett Braithwaite (1870–1932), British Army officer
- William Thomas Braithwaite (1844–1918), Northern Irish businessman, freemason, and marksman
