= Hindman =

Hindman (usually /ˈhaɪndmən/) is a surname. Notable people with the surname include:

- Bill Hindman (1922–1999), American actor
- Daniel T. Hindman (1839–1915), American politician
- Darwin Hindman (1933–2019), American politician
- Dorothy Hindman (born 1966), American composer and music educator
- Earl Hindman (1942–2003), American actor
- George W. Hindman (died 1878), American cowboy and law enforcement officer
- James R. Hindman (1839–1912), 23rd Lieutenant Governor of Kentucky
- Jessica Chiccehitto Hindman (born 1981), American author and English professor
- Stan Hindman (1944–2020), American football player
- Thomas C. Hindman (1828–1868), American lawyer, politician and Confederate Army major general in the American Civil War
- Trent Hindman (born 1995), American racing driver
- William Hindman (1743–1822), American politician

== See also ==
- Hyndman, another surname
