= James Grattan =

James Grattan may refer to:

- James Grattan (MP for Dublin City) (1711–1766), MP for Dublin City, father of Henry Grattan
- James Grattan (Wicklow MP) (1783–1854), Irish politician, MP for Wicklow
- James Grattan (curler) (born 1974), Canadian curler

== See also ==
- Grattan (disambiguation)
