= Regius Professor of Botany =

Regius Professor of Botany may refer to

- Regius Professor of Botany (Aberdeen)
- Regius Professor of Botany (Cambridge)
- Regius Professor of Botany (Glasgow)
