= John Grattan =

John Grattan may refer to:

- John Lawrence Grattan, US Cavalry officer whose poor judgement and inexperience led to the Grattan massacre
- John Grattan (naturalist), Irish naturalist and anthropologist
