= James Grimshaw =

Irish naturalist (1798–1857)

James Grimshaw (1798–1857) was an Irish naturalist in the early 19th century.

Born in County Antrim, Grimshaw worked in his family's linen business. He married Mary Templeton, a daughter of the Irish botanist John Templeton.

Grimshaw was interested in mainly botany and wrote numerous scientific papers, including "Flora of the Cave Hill". He was a founding member of both the Belfast Natural History Society and the Botanic Gardens in Belfast. Part of his herbarium is now in the Ulster Museum.
