= Cherry Crawford Hyndman =

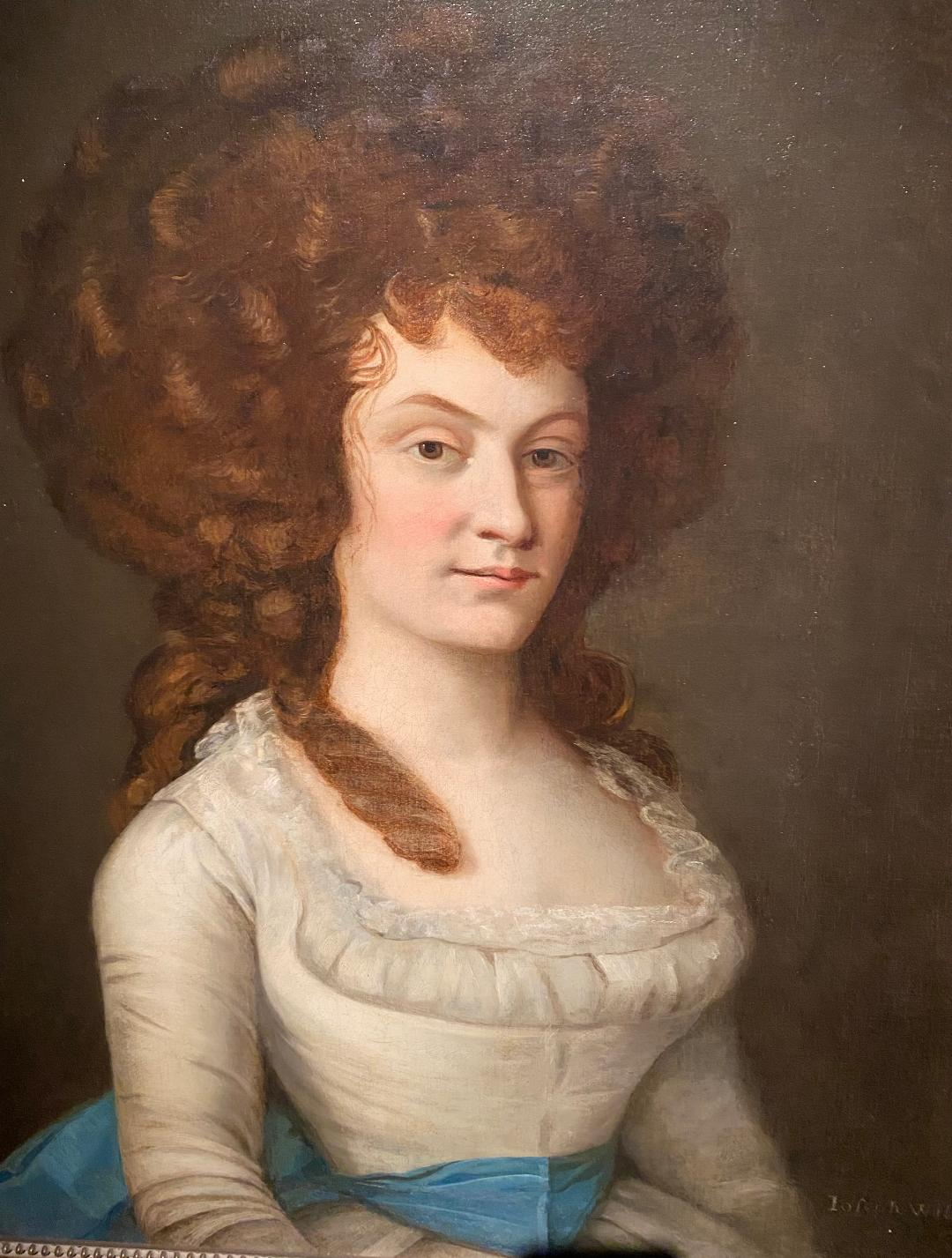
- Miss Cherry Crawford by Joseph Wilson, 1789
- Born: 1768
- Died: 1845 (aged 76–77)
- Movement: Society of United Irishmen

Cherry Crawford Hyndman (1768–1845) was the mistress of a liberal political household in Belfast, Ireland, and reputedly in the 1790s an active member of the republican Society of United Irishmen.

== Biography ==
Cherry Crawford was born in Cornacrow, Laragh, County Monaghan, the second of two daughters to George Crawford and Fanny Cherry. both of whom had Scottish ancestry. Her father is recorded as a linen draper, operating a bleaching mill ("Castle Dawson") in the district.

In 1791–92, she married James Hyndman (1761?–1825), a woollen merchant and auctioneer, whose Presbyterian family in Belfast had trading links and relatives in the West Indies. Hyndman, as a young man, had been a captain in the Volunteers, a militia which seized the opportunity presented by the American Revolutionary War to press for Irish legislative independence and parliamentary reform.

The Ulster Museum in Belfast displays a portrait of Cherry Crawford painted in 1789. The curator's notes describe her as "the only woman to be admitted to the Brotherhood of the United Irishmen". The papers of her Belfast contemporaries, Mary Ann McCracken and Martha McTier, record women taking the United Irish "test" or pledge. This was to "forward a brotherhood of affection among Irishmen of every religious persuasion" in the cause of an independent and representative Irish government. But they also suggest that women were organised in separate societies or clubs.

If she was admitted by United Irishmen to their regular proceedings, presumably of their third society in Belfast of which her husband was secretary, it may have been something of an exception. Martha McTier does record herself being a participant in "select", if not regular, meetings of the United Irishmen in Belfast at which resolutions were passed.

In Monaghan, George Crawford was a United Irishman. He sheltered William Hamilton of Enniskillen, a talented public speaker who drew large groups, including large numbers of Catholic Defenders, to hear him expound on the objectives of the United movement and on Thomas Paine’s Rights of Man.

In Belfast, which was heavily secured, neither she nor her husband appear to have been implicated in the eventual rebellion. She did, however, run foul of the garrison: leaving the bedside of a sick friend, she was met in the street by the military guard, who arrested her and had her whipped. Whether she was recognised or not is unclear. James Hyndman had not joined other merchants and local dignitaries in signing a declaration of loyalty to the British Crown published just before the risings to the north and south of the town in June 1798.

Cherry Hyndman (of 22 Donegall Street) died on 3 August 1845 and is buried in Belfast's Clifton Street Cemetery. In addition to her husband, she was predeceased by her sister Elizabeth McTear (1765–1836) and by her youngest son Hugh Hyndman (1802–1832). She was survived by her daughter Fanny Hyndman (1793–1853) and by her son George Crawford Hyndman (1796–1867). George, a Liberal in politics, and a Unitarian in religion, was engaged in both the business and civic life of Belfast. A dedicated naturalist, he was a founder member of the Belfast Natural History and Philosophical Society (BNHPS), and of the Botanical and Horticultural Society (responsible for initiating the Belfast Botanical Gardens), and the first president of the Belfast Naturalists' Field Club. He was also prominent in the management of the Belfast (later Royal Belfast) Academical Institution, founded by the United Irishman William Drennan.
