= Robert Shipboy MacAdam =

Irish antiquary, folklorist and linguist (1808–1895)

Robert Shipboy McAdam (Irish: Roibeárd Mac Ádhaimh; 1808–1895) was an Irish antiquary, folklorist and linguist and was the most active figure among the Belfast Presbyterians prominent in the early Irish-language revival. He was a secretary of Cuideacht Gaoidhilge Uladh (the Ulster Gaelic Society), president of the Belfast Natural History and Philosophical Society, and the founding editor of the Ulster Journal of Archaeology. Together with the 20th century Gaelic scholar Cardinal Tomás Ó Fiaich, since 1991 his memory has been honoured in the name of Belfast's Irish-language cultural centre Cultúrlann McAdam Ó Fiaich (An Chultúrlann).

== Life and work ==
=== Family and business ===
MacAdam was born to Jane Shipboy (1774–1827) and her husband James MacAdam (1755–1821), who lived next to their hardware shop in High Street, Belfast. Before being apprenticed to his father, he was educated at the new Belfast Academical Institution, a school founded on progressive principles by the former United Irishman William Drennan, and other veterans of the radical politics of the 1790s. His first Irish language influence may have been his uncle, Robert MacAdam, who collected Gaelic songs and was a member of the Belfast Harp Society. At the school it would have been further stimulated by the Presbyterian minister, Hebrew and classical scholar, the Rev. William Neilson, author of An Introduction to the Irish Language (1808).

MacAdam, who in time was said to be fluent in a dozen languages, perfected his command of Irish in course of his extensive travels across Ireland on behalf of the family business.

With his older brother, James MacAdam, in 1846 he established the Soho Foundry in Townsend Street At its height, before the death in 1861 of his brother (a naturalist and geologist who in the interim had become the first librarian of Queen's College, Belfast), the firm had a workforce of 250 and an international reputation for the production of turbine engines (horizontal water wheels developed in France by Benoît Fourneyron).

MacAdam was a member of the Non-Subscribing First Presbyterian Church in Rosemary Street.

=== The Ulster Gaelic Society ===
MacAdam followed Samuel Neilson into Cuideacht Gaoidhilge Uladh (the Ulster Gaelic Society) when it was formed in 1828 under the chairmanship of Dr James MacDonnell and with the patronage of the Arthur Hill, Marquess of Downshire. While the members were interested in the contemporary Irish vernacular, rather than in the classical language of manuscripts, they abjured the evangelism that persuaded other Protestant laymen and clerics to study the spoken language. MacAdam, who became the society's joint secretary, protested that efforts to "beguile the poor Catholics from their faith" had done "more harm to the language than foreign persecution for 300 years". At the same time, he faulted the Catholic clergy. They had neglected to teach the Catechism, and to preach, in Irish, "even though that tongue had been the shield and protector of their faith".

MacAdam does not appear to have been in sympathy with the Catholic-majority movement for national self-government. This was led by Daniel O'Connell, who though a Gaeilgeoir, declared himself "sufficiently utilitarian not to regret" the gradual abandonment of the language of his ancestors.

When Queen Victoria visited Belfast in 1849, MacAdam composed a series of publicly displayed "mottos" in Irish. These extended to "Ireland's Queen" a "thousand welcomes" from her "loving and loyal" subjects.

MacAdam committed to the task of collecting Irish folklore and manuscripts, promoting the study of Irish, and publishing books in the language. Among the books produced by the society were Tomás Ó Fiannachta's translations into Irish of Maria Edgeworth's moral stories, Forgive and Forget and Rosanna, and An introduction to the Irish language intended for the use of Irish classes in the Royal Belfast Academical Institution – a grammar on which MacAdam and Ó Fiannachta collaborated.

=== Ulster Journal of Archaeology and later projects ===
After the Ulster Gaelic Society ceased to operate in 1843, MacAdam employed the poet Aodh Mac Domhnaill (Hugh McDonnell, who worked with MacAdam in the Soho foundry) as a full-time scribe and collector of songs, folklore, and Irish-language manuscripts. MacAdam himself collected extensively on business trips throughout Ulster and north Leinster. He also found ready material among Irish-speaking immigrants to Belfast. He was to discover, for example, that Charlement Street (now buried under the Castle Court shopping centre) was inhabited exclusively by Irish-speaking basket-makers from Omeath.

MacAdam was the prime mover in introducing a question on the knowledge of Irish in the 1851 Census. In 1852, he and his brother organised a major exhibition of for a conference of the British Association for the Advancement of Science held at the Belfast Museum of which, as a member of the Belfast Natural History and Philosophical Society he was a co-founder. It was to "enable strangers from other countries to judge for themselves the nature and extent of our ancient [Irish] civilisation".

This led in turn to the Ulster Journal of Archaeology, an annual publication that MacAdam was to edit until the end of its first series in 1862. In his prospectus for the journal, MacAdam proposed broad multi-disciplinary vision of the subject.

Archaeology, the science, par excellence, of "old things" like all other divisions of human knowledge, when rightly viewed, does not stand by itself but is continually coming into contact with other sciences........ It is not history; it is not philology; not ethnology; but these and many other subjects are interwoven with it so closely, that the boundaries can hardly be defined.... Every science may be said to have its archaeological province.....

MacAdam concluded his editorial address in the first edition of the Ulster Journal of Archaeology by observing that "society in Ulster seems breaking up" with the "scattered the ruins of the ancient structure fast hurrying to decay". He likened the rapidity of change to one of the dissolving views of a magic lantern show, with steam and education transforming areas that "conquest and colonisation failed to effect in centuries". In serial form, the journal published MacAdam's compilation of 600 proverbs in Irish. But many other projects to gather up, and to breathe new life, into the "fragments" of the Gaelic past were never brought to fruition.

An English–Irish dictionary, compiled with Mac Domhnaill, and which ran to more than 1,000 manuscript pages, was never published (and lay undisturbed in the Queen's University Library until 1996). Neither was his collection of 400 songs in Irish, or his proposed Irish language newspaper. MacAdam's work and contributions were nonetheless acknowledged by the Belfast Natural History and Philosophical Society, which he had attended from the age of 13: in 1888 the society elected him president.

=== Death and legacy ===
Robert MacAdam did not marry. He lived with his brother at 18 College Square East, Belfast, where he died on 3 January 1895. He was buried in Knockbreda churchyard.

Although his friends did eventually create an annuity that allowed him to live in reasonable comfort, MacAdam's last years had been dogged by ill health and poverty. In 1894, the Townend Street foundry had been forced to close. In 1889, he sold an important collection of Irish manuscripts to the Irish antiquarian and Church of Ireland Bishop of Down, Connor and Dromore, William Reeves. In 1892, after Reeves's death, this collection was bought for the Royal Irish Academy by Maxwell Close and is still held by the Academy, under the name of "The Mac Adam and Reeves Collection". Other of his papers papers are held by the Belfast Central Library and the Public Records Office of Northern Ireland.

In 1894, MacAdam endorsed and supported the revival of the Ulster Journal of Archaeology. Its editor, after an hiatus of thirty years, was Francis Joseph Bigger, a key figure in a new "northern revival" of the Irish language. The following year, shortly after MacAdam's death, this was given further impetus by the establishment of the first branch of the Gaelic League in Belfast. Even in the wake of Gladstone's Second Home Rule Bill, it was an initiative still able to straddle the city's political/sectarian divide. More than half of its first committee were Protestants.

Cultúrlann McAdam Ó Fiaich was founded in 1991 after the purchase of Broadway Presbyterian Church on Falls Road, Belfast. It is named after McAdam and 20th century Gaelic scholar Cardinal Tomás Ó Fiaich.
