= James McAdam =

Irish scientist (1801–1861)

James MacAdam painted by Richard Hooke

James MacAdam (1801, Belfast – 1861) was an Irish naturalist and geologist.

MacAdam was born to James MacAdam and his wife Jane Shipboy, who ran a hardware shop in High Street, Belfast.

He was educated at the Royal Belfast Academical Institution, and then at Trinity College Dublin. He had a private geological museum, which included specimens collected during excavations made during the construction of the Irish railways. In 1849 he was appointed the first librarian of Queen's College, Belfast. He was a Fellow of the Geological Society, founder member and President of the Belfast Natural History Society and one of the founders of Belfast Botanic Gardens. He was also a co-founder of the Ulster Journal of Archaeology.

His younger brother Robert Shipboy MacAdam was his business partner in the Soho Foundry in Townsend Street which they had established in 1846. At its height in the 1850s, the firm had a workforce of 250 and an international reputation for the production of turbine engines (horizontal water wheels developed in France by Benoît Fourneyron). Robert was an antiquary and leading Irish-language revivalist.
