= The Hatfield House =

Pub in Belfast, Northern Ireland

Coordinates: 54°35′08″N 5°55′22″W

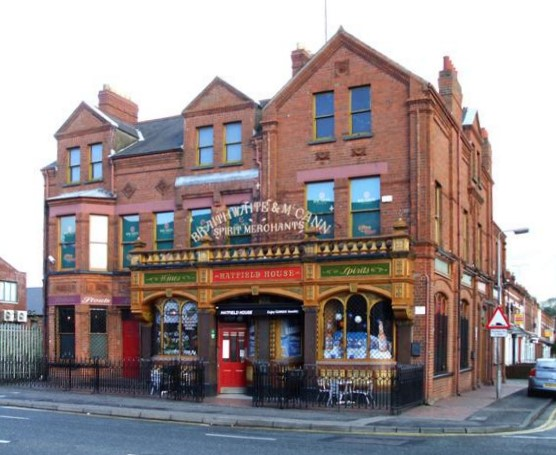
The Hatfield House, Ormeau Road, Belfast

The Hatfield House is a listed pub in Ormeau Road, Belfast, Northern Ireland.

It was built in about 1870, originally as a shop and was bought by Braithwaite & McCann in the 1880s.

The conversion to a pub was designed by William Thomas Braithwaite, who was the co-founder of the Braithwaite & McCann public house chain . The Hatfield House was their first pub, but by 1899 they also owned the Red Lion, also on the Ormeau Road, and the Garrick in Chichester Street. They expanded to acquire the Store Bar in Church Lane and the Ulster Tavern in Chichester Street, and eventually owned 15 bars and pubs in Belfast.
