= Thomas Workman (entomologist) =

Irish entomologist and arachnologist

Thomas Workman (14 August 1843 – 11 May 1900) was an Irish entomologist and arachnologist who travelled widely collecting butterflies and studying spiders. He is best known for his book Malaysian Spiders, published in 1896, in which he described several new species.

== Biography ==
Thomas Workman was born at Ceara, Windsor Avenue, Belfast, Ireland on 14 August 1843 into a wealthy family involved in muslin, linen and commerce.

=== Business ===
Thomas was the elder brother of Frank Workman, born in 1856. The brothers co-founded the Belfast shipyard of Workman Clark in 1880. Thomas became a successful businessman, at first in the linen trade and then in shipbuilding. He was vice-chairman of Workman Clark and director of the Irish Weaving Company, as well as being a Justice of the Peace.

=== Nature ===
Workman had an interest in insects from a young age and was encouraged by one of his teachers. Aside from his work on spiders, especially those of the Far East, he was also a lepidopterist.

=== Travel ===
In 1869 Workman travelled in North America, spending his time mainly in the West, much with native tribes. His trip journals and accounts of the natural history of the American plains and Native Americans (Thomas Workman, Illustrated Notebook, Letters from the Far West) are now in the Public Records Office in Belfast. His collection of North American Indian artefacts is in the Ulster Museum. Each year, when business and family permitted, Workman spent lengthy periods in foreign lands, collecting insects, especially butterflies and spiders.

He travelled around the world for the rest of his life. His most significant trips were;

- 1881 - Brazil
- 1883 - India, Burma, Singapore, China and the Philippines
- 1888 - Singapore and Ceylon
- 1890 - Singapore and Java
- 1892 - Ceylon, Singapore and India

=== Societies ===
He was, as well as being actively involved in the civic administration of Belfast, the Honorary Librarian of the Belfast Natural History and Philosophical Society becoming president in 1898. He was a member of the British Association for the Advancement of Science. Their 1852 meeting was held in his warehouse on Belfast's Bedford Street.

=== Death ===
He died in St. Paul, Minnesota, U.S.A in 1900, having caught a chill en route from Vancouver following a trip to the Rocky Mountains.

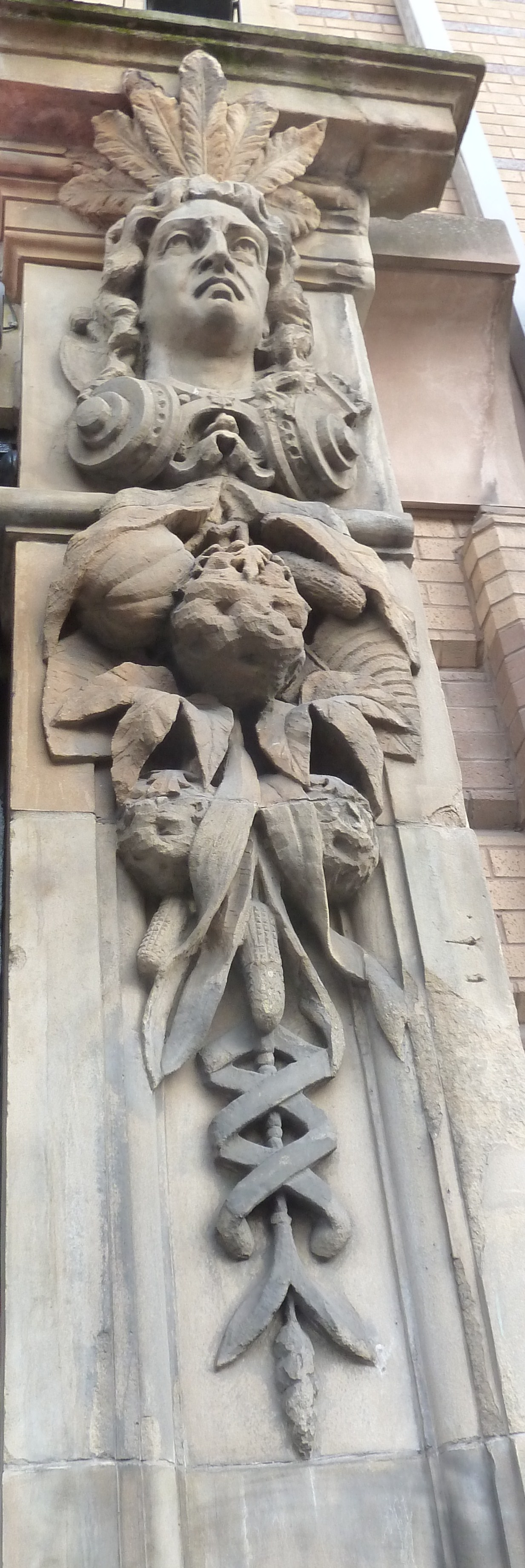
SemiCaryatid Victoria Street, Belfast. One of five symbolic of trade (1865)

== Family and legacy ==
He married Margaret Elliot and they had seven children; their son Robert was president of the Linen Hall Library for over 20 years.

=== Achievements ===
He had an extensive world butterfly collection including specimens purchased from Hans Fruhstorfer and Otto Staudinger. Included are specimens figured in Macrolepidoptera of the World. A systematic description of the hitherto known Macrolepidoptera, edited in collaboration with well-known specialists published in Stuttgart by Alfred Kermen. edited by Adalbert Seitz.

=== Contacts ===
- Octavius Pickard-Cambridge (1828–1917) England
- Tord Tamerlan Teodor Thorell (1830–1901) Sweden
- Adalbert Seitz (1860–1938) Germany

=== Spiders named after Workman ===
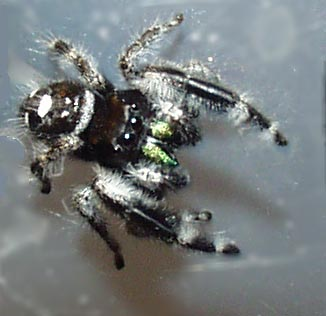
Phidippus workmania a species named for Workman

- Damarchus workmanii Thorell
- Theridium workmanii Thorell
- Phidippus workmanii Peckham & Peckham
- Goleta workmanii Peckham & Peckham

== Published works ==
- 1880 Irish Spiders in The Entomologist
- 1896 Malaysian Spiders Volume 1 Privately published in Belfast. (Volume II was completed but not published before his death)

== Collections ==
- Campbell College, Belfast: Lepidoptera
- Ulster Museum, Belfast: Lepidoptera
- National Museum of Ireland, Dublin Irish spiders: Lepidoptera
- Natural History Museum, London World spiders: Lepidoptera

His ethnographic collections are in the Ulster Museum in Belfast. He also donated a collection to the National Museum in Dublin.

== Correspondence ==
Workman's correspondence, diaries etc. are in the Public records Office Belfast.
