= John Grainger (antiquarian) =

Irish cleric and antiquarian

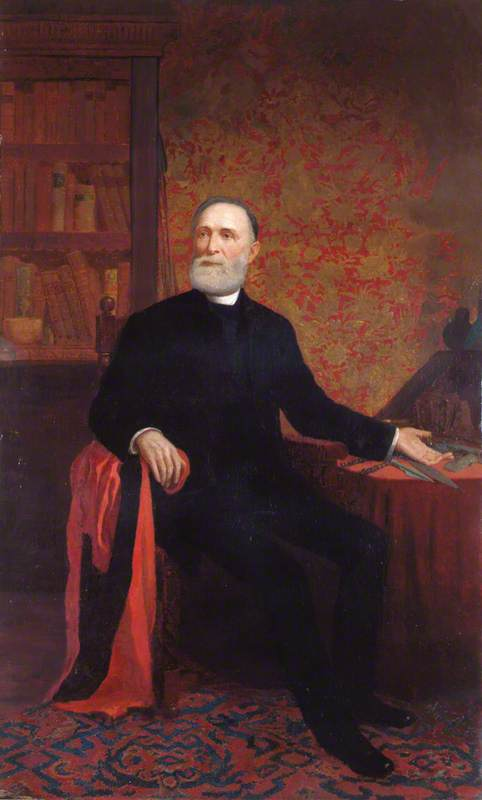
Canon John Grainger

John Grainger (19 March 1830, Belfast – 24 November ) was an Irish cleric and antiquarian.

Grainger was educated at Belfast Academy and Trinity College, Dublin. He worked in his father’s shipping business until his father died.

After gaining a Doctorate of Divinity in 1870 he became Rector of Broughshane, County Antrim. He also served in Dublin and Belfast.

He had an interest in geology and natural history, as well as Irish antiquities, and enjoyed travelling and collecting specimens. He was an indiscriminating collector, who filled his house with a mass of often unlabelled specimens including stuffed birds, shells, insects, coins, minerals, a dolmen, weapons from New Zealand, and archaeological finds. According to Robert Lloyd Praeger his collection of Irish stone tools was ‘’especially valuable as a study in the gentle art of forgery’’.

In 1876 he was elected MRIA; he was also the first president of the Belfast Naturalists' Field Club. He was a member of the Belfast Natural History and Philosophical Society.

He donated 60,000 items to the museum of the Belfast Natural History Society; the museum had to build an annexe to contain the collection.

== Family ==
He was the oldest of six children; he never married.

== Works ==
Partial list

- 1853. Catalogue of the Shells found in the Alluvial Deposits of a Belfast site of the Irish Mesolithic. Proc. Roy. Irish Acad. 56 C, 1-195.
- --- Results of excavations in High St., Belfast. Ulster Journ. Arch. ix. 113-121.
- 1874. On the Fossils of the Post-tertiary Deposits of Ireland. Rep. Bmt. Assoc, for 1874; Sections, pp. 73–76.
- 1882. Affairs in Ulster 1607–43
