= Grattan =

Grattan may refer to:

== People ==
=== Given name ===
- Grattan Kerans (1941–2019), American politician from Oregon
- Grattan O'Leary (1888–1976), journalist, publisher and member of the Canadian Senate
- Grattan H. Wheeler (1783–1852), U.S. Representative from New York

=== Surname ===
- C. Hartley Grattan (1902–1980), American economic analyst and historian
- Harry Grattan (c. 1867–1951), British stage actor, singer, dancer and writer
- Henry Grattan (1746–1820), Irish politician
- Henry Grattan Jnr (1789–1859), Irish politician
- Jennifer Grattan (born 1987), Canadian professional wrestler with the stage name "Portia Perez"
- John Grattan (naturalist) (1800–1871), Irish naturalist and anthropologist
- Michelle Grattan (born 1944), Australian journalist
- Thomas Colley Grattan (1792–1864), Irish writer
- William J. Grattan (1876–1938), New York politician

== Places ==
=== United States ===
- Grattan Township, Michigan
- Grattan Township, Minnesota
- Grattan Township, Holt County, Nebraska

== Other ==
- Grattan Bridge, a road bridge spanning the River Liffey in Dublin, Ireland
- Grattan Institute, an Australian public-policy think tank
- Grattan massacre, 1854 incident between the U.S. army and the Brulé Lakota (Sioux)
- Grattan plc, a British catalogue clothing retailer
- Grattan Stadium, sponsored name of Odsal Stadium, home of Bradford Bulls Rugby League Football Club, in Bradford, England
