= Jessica Chiccehitto Hindman =

American author and violinist

- Born: 1981 (age 44–45) (Note: In 2020, Hindman was reported to be 39); West Virginia
- Education: B.A., Middle Eastern studies, MFA, creative nonfiction writing, 2009, Columbia University; PhD, English, 2013, University of North Texas
- Occupation: Author
- Notable work: Sounds Like Titanic: A Memoir
- Spouse: Nathan De Lee
- Website: jessicahindman.com

Jessica Chiccehitto Hindman (born 1981) is an American author. Her novel Sounds Like Titanic: A Memoir was a finalist for the National Book Critics Circle Award in Autobiography in 2019. She is also an associate professor of English at Northern Kentucky University.

Growing up in West Virginia, Hindman played the violin throughout elementary, middle, and high school. She was encouraged to apply to Columbia University for Middle Eastern studies although her parents were unable to afford full tuition. By her senior year, she was in desperate need of money to pay her tuition and applied as a professional violinist in The Composer’s Ensemble. She spent four years pretending to play the violin while a soundtrack drowned out her music until she became addicted to cocaine and was diagnosed with an anxiety disorder. After getting psychological help, she was hired as an admissions secretary at Columbia and earned her MFA in creative nonfiction writing.

Hindman accepted a position as an associate professor of English at Northern Kentucky University where she then published her novel Sounds Like Titanic: A Memoir. Her memoir was a finalist for the National Book Critics Circle Award in Autobiography in 2019.

== Early life ==
Hindman was born and raised in West Virginia to a doctor and social worker. Although she aspired to play the violin at the age of five, her parents were unable to provide her with one due to the lack of teachers available. Her parents eventually bought her one for her eighth birthday and drove several hours across Virginia for her lessons. She continued to play the violin throughout her school years and performed at school assemblies.

== Education ==
During her high school years, her boyfriend at the time convinced her to study at a college in the Northeast. Although her parents were unable to afford full tuition, she moved to New York and attended Columbia University. Hindman later revealed that her boyfriend was abusive in an essay titled Advanced Placement, which received a Reader’s Choice Award. Originally enrolled in their music program, she switched to Middle Eastern studies which landed her on a study-abroad program in Egypt during 9/11. By her senior year, she needed money to pay her tuition after already donated her eggs and trying “all sorts of terrible jobs." She applied for a job as a professional violinist at The Composer’s Ensemble (Note: In an interview, Hindman states she will keep "The Composer's" real identity a secret as her book "was not meant to be an investigative report or an exposé. I don’t want him outed or shamed." Vulture claimed to have identified The Composer as Tim Janis.) and was surprised when they hired her. Unknowingly to her at the time, her job required her to perform at shopping malls, craft fairs, and local PBS stations across the country for eight hours. However, instead of playing in front of a live microphone, her boss played the soundtrack of a different violinist. Although she said it felt degrading, the job paid well and she needed the money. She was also forced to sell CDs to earn bonuses and slowly became addicted to amphetamines and cocaine in order to stay awake and work more hours. During this time, Hindman was also diagnosed with an anxiety disorder based in an existential terror.

After touring with The Composer’s Ensemble across America for their God Bless America tour, Hindman moved back home and lived in her parents' basement. She described feeling physically intact but losing her grip on reality. Due to her anxiety disorder, she was too afraid to go outside and began seeing a psychiatrist. Following six months of treatment, she was hired at Columbia as an admissions secretary, which allowed her to enroll in its writing course for free. As the job also secured her with free health care, she began to recover from her anxiety disorder and began drafting her memoir Sounds Like Titanic in 2005. During her second year in the writing program, she applied for teaching fellowships and began to work towards becoming a professor.

== Career ==
Hindman earned her PhD in English from the University of North Texas in 2013 and based her dissertation on her experiences in The Composer’s Ensemble. Her dissertation earned her the Toulouse Dissertation Fellowship and a position as an assistant professor of English at New Mexico Highlands University. She eventually joined the faculty in the Department of English at Northern Kentucky University in 2014 as an assistant professor. She was eventually promoted to associate professor of English in 2019 and received the Northern Kentucky University's Excellence in Research Award. That same year, she published her debut novel Sounds Like Titanic: A Memoir which focused on her experience in The Composer’s Ensemble. It was named a finalist for the 2019 National Book Critics Circle Award in Autobiography and named a one of Amazon's Best Books of 2019.
