= William Thomas Braithwaite =

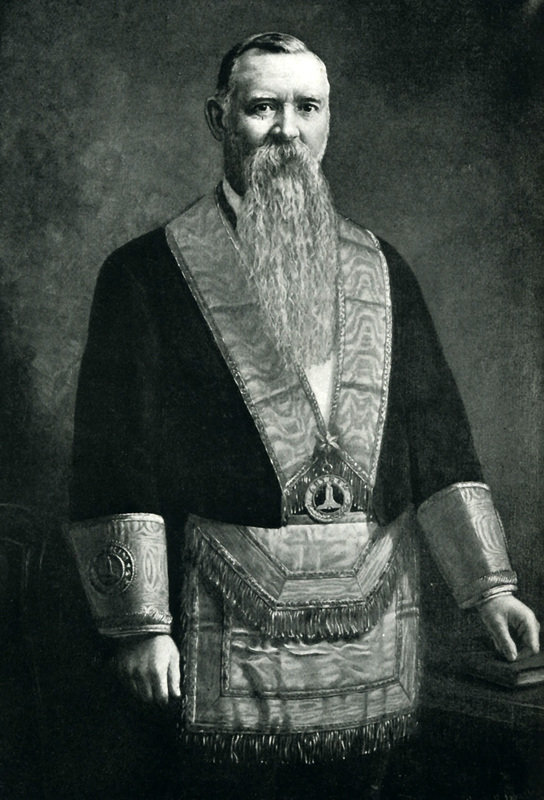
William Thomas Braithwaite, c. 1920. (original painting in colour)

William Thomas Braithwaite (14 April 1844 – 22 January 1918) was a Northern Irish businessman, freemason, and marksman. He was the co-founder of the public house chain of Braithwaite & McCann which eventually owned 15 bars and pubs in Belfast. In 1906 he made a large donation of paintings to the Belfast Municipal Museum and Art Gallery, now known as the Ulster Museum.

== Early life ==
William Braithwaite was born in Belfast on 14 April 1844. He never married.

== Career ==
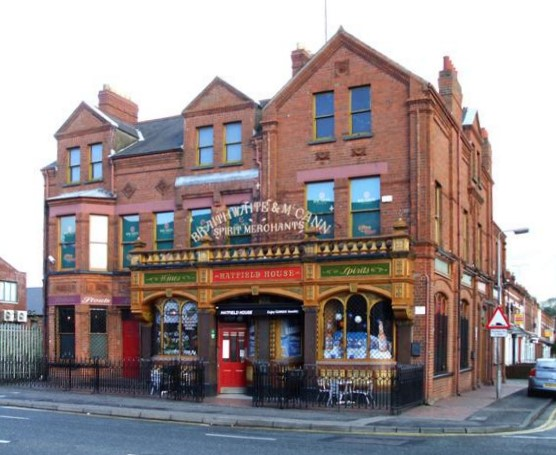
Braithwaite's first pub, the Hatfield House, Ormeau Road, Belfast

Braithwaite was the co-founder of the public house chain and spirit merchants Braithwaite & McCann. Their first pub was the Hatfield House on the Ormeau Road in the 1880s. By 1899 they also owned the Red Lion, also on the Ormeau Road, and the Garrick in Chichester Street. They expanded to acquire the Store Bar in Church Lane and the Ulster Tavern in Chichester Street, and eventually owned 15 bars and pubs in Belfast. The Hatfield House is a listed building with the Northern Ireland Department of Communities and is described as a "rare example of a traditional public house" and an "important local landmark of considerable social and local interest".

== Other activities ==
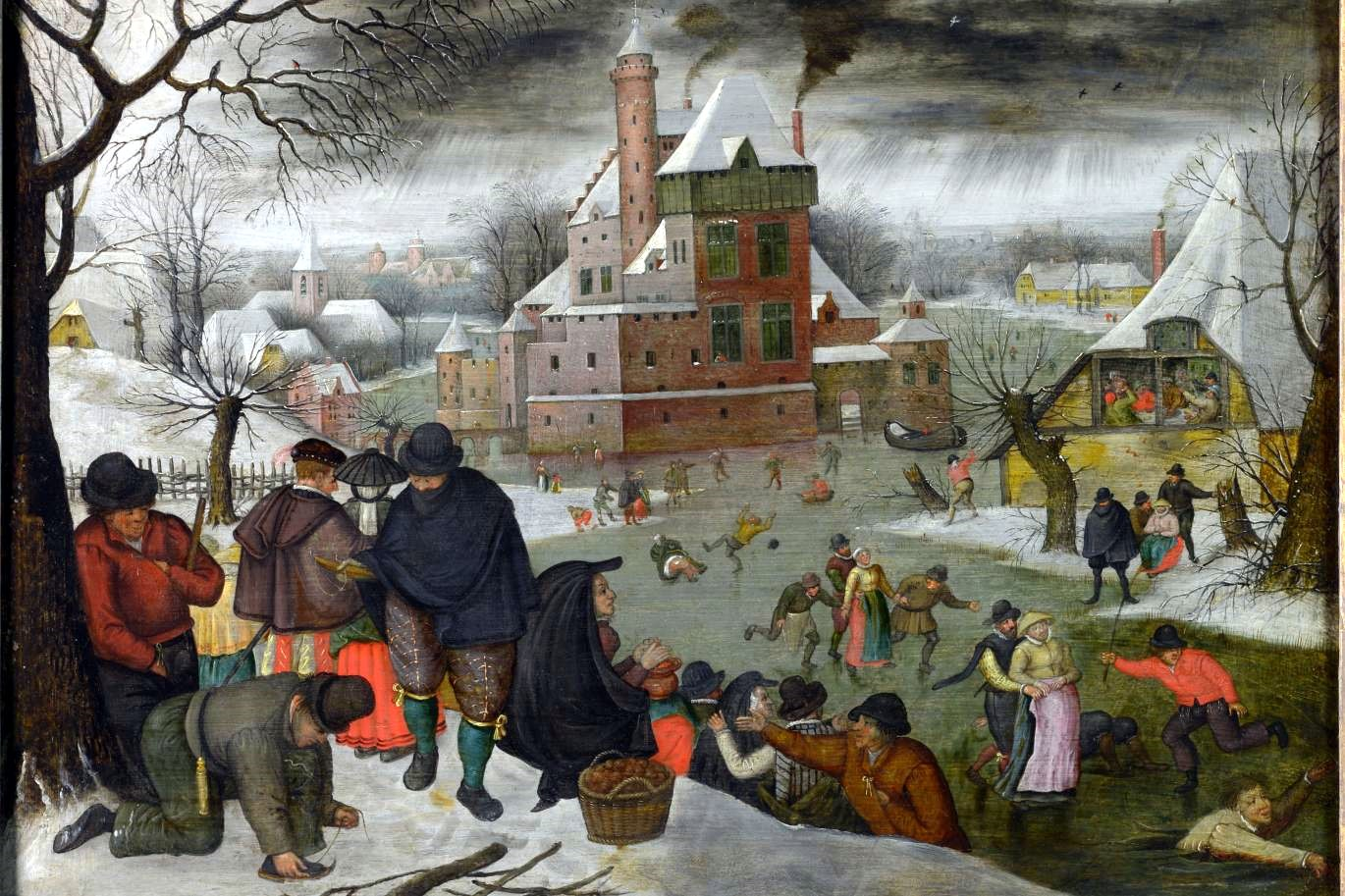
Winter, Pieter Breughel the Younger, 1633

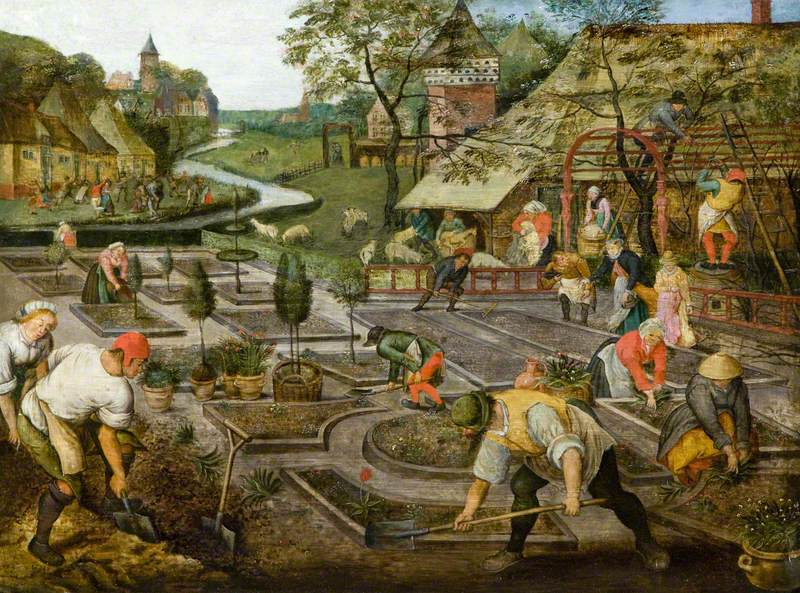
Spring, Pieter Breughel the Younger, 1633 (before restoration)

Described by the Belfast Evening Telegraph as a "world-famed rifle shot", Braithwaite acquired the nickname "Bullseye Braithwaite". He represented Ireland in the Elcho Shield competition at Bisley for 20 years and won the Albert Jewel, the Wimbledon Cup, the Duke of Cambridge's and the Secretary of State trophies.

He was a freemason, and orangeman and founded the Orange Widows' Fund.

He was a member of the Belfast Natural History and Philosophical Society, which became the Belfast Municipal Museum and Art Gallery, now known as the Ulster Museum, and in 1906 he made a large donation of paintings to the institution. He also encouraged the Philosophical Society to donate their own collection to the museum.

Among the paintings Braithwaite donated to the museum were Winter and Spring (both 1633) by Pieter Breughel the Younger. They would originally have been part of a set of the Four Seasons. After poorly carried out repairs in the 1960s the original attribution to Breughel the Younger fell into doubt and was not restored until after the paintings were cleaned for the BBC Four television series Britain's Lost Masterpieces.

Described as "retiring", the only public office that Braithwaite held was on the board of the Belfast City and District Water Commissioners.

== Death ==
Braithwaite died at his home of Botanic Avenue, Belfast, on 22 January 1918.
