= Belfast Natural History Society =

Learned society in Northern Ireland

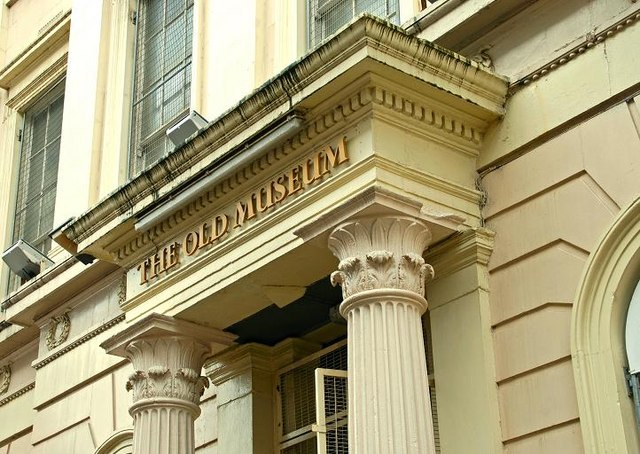
The Belfast Natural History and Philosophical Society Museum at No. 7 College Square North, completed in 1831. The portico is an exact copy of the octagon tower of Andronicus in Athens.

The Belfast Natural History and Philosophical Society was founded in 1821 to promote the scientific study of animals, plants, fossils, rocks and minerals.

== History ==
The Belfast Academical Institute was established in 1814; seven years later, one of the professors, James Lawson Drummond suggested the creation of a new society for the natural sciences.

The Society was founded by Drummond, George Crawford Hyndman, James Grimshaw, James McAdam, Robert Patterson, Robert Simms, Francis Archer, the Thomas Dix Hincks, Edward Hincks and Edmund Getty. Five years later in 1826 Alexander Henry Haliday and William Thompson both joined. In 1823, the Society's collection and the small collection begun in 1788 in the rooms of the Belfast Reading Society and that of the Belfast Literary Society were moved to Belfast Academical Institution where James Bryce was centralising Belfast's rapidly expanding natural history holdings.

In 1827, the Society took part in the creation of a Botanic Garden in Belfast.

A new building opened at No. 7 College Square North in 1831.

How big the first collections were is unknown but the 1831 figure of 300 insects given when the Belfast Natural History and Philosophical Society Museum opened to non-members may refer to specimens on display. The research material would have been much more numerous and expanded rapidly during the next decade. Specimens from England, the West Indies, Lapland, France, Greece, Italy, Senegal, New Holland, Java, Sumatra, Ceylon, Mauritius, Colombia, Recife, Peru, Virginia, India and West Africa were acquired by gift. The Society maintained an excellent library and received many journals from corresponding members of English and continental natural history societies. Notable contributors were John Obadiah Westwood, Francis Walker, Carl August Dohrn), Maximilian Spinola and John Gould and Charles Darwin.

Many of the collections and some of the books were transferred to the Trinity College Museum, Dublin in 1843 after the society became the Belfast Natural History and Philosophical Society in 1842 when lectures in chemistry, physics, engineering and were allowed. Specimens remaining in Belfast are kept in the Ulster Museum where they bear the tag BNHPS collection. The formerly central role of natural history and archaeology diminished from this year on and in 1863 the Belfast Naturalists' Field Club was founded. The fragmentary BNHS minute books (pre-1842) and few letters are in the Public Record Office of Northern Ireland, in Belfast.

The Society launched the Ulster Journal of Archaeology in 1853.

The Society started the Belfast Naturalists’ Field Club in 1863.

The Society still exists today retaining ownership of the Old Museum Building, publishing occasional books, and running a lecture series out of the Linen Hall Library.

== The museum ==
Musei Belfastiani

Fundamenta Prima PraesentibusSocietatis Historiae Naturalis apud BelfastamSociis, aliisque multis scientiae faventibusqui ad hoc opus pecuniam contulerant: Locavit Vir Honoratissimus Georgius Augustus Chichester Marchio de Donegall IV. Non Maias MDCCCXXX.Rege Augustissimo Georgio IV. Annum Regni XI. Agente. Thomas J Duff, T. Jackson, Architectis; J. Johnston, Redemptore.

The museum was the first erected in Ireland by public subscription. From its inception in 1831 and for 47 years the Museum employed a curator taxidermist named William Darragh (1813–1892). In the first report of the society he wrote an account entitled "Directions for preserving subjects in natural history". This covered birds, tortoises etc., lizards and serpents, fish, shells, corals, seafans etc., crabs, lobsters etc., asterias or starfish, insects, botanical specimens, seeds, minerals and Fossil. He notes, correctly anticipating foreign specimens "As there is now no vexatious delay or trouble experienced by Custom-house regulations, specimens of natural history being admitted free of duty, it is recommended that all packages may be entered in the ship's papers, and if a list of all the contents of each package could, with convenience, be attached inside the lid of the box or cover, the risk of injury to the specimens, by examination at the Custom-house, would in great measure be avoided". Also "Should it even happen that the specimens be already possessed by the Society, still duplicates are desirable, since such as are not possessed by the Museum can be readily exchanged for others that may be wanted".

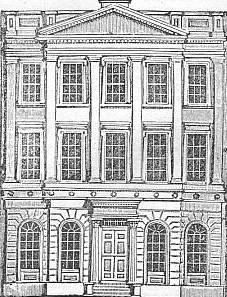
The Museum in 1831. The architects were Thomas Duff and Thomas Jackson. The building has three stories. In the lower story were the lecture-room and library. Each of the upper stories is a single room, forty-seven feet in length, and twenty-seven feet wide, which housed the public museum. A laboratory was later attached to the lecture room.

Although the focus of the collections was primarily on zoology, botany and geology substantial archaeological, ethnographic and antiquarian acquisitions were made and in 1835 the Society gained an Egyptian mummy, Takabuti. Her remains were donated to the Ulster Museum in 1910.

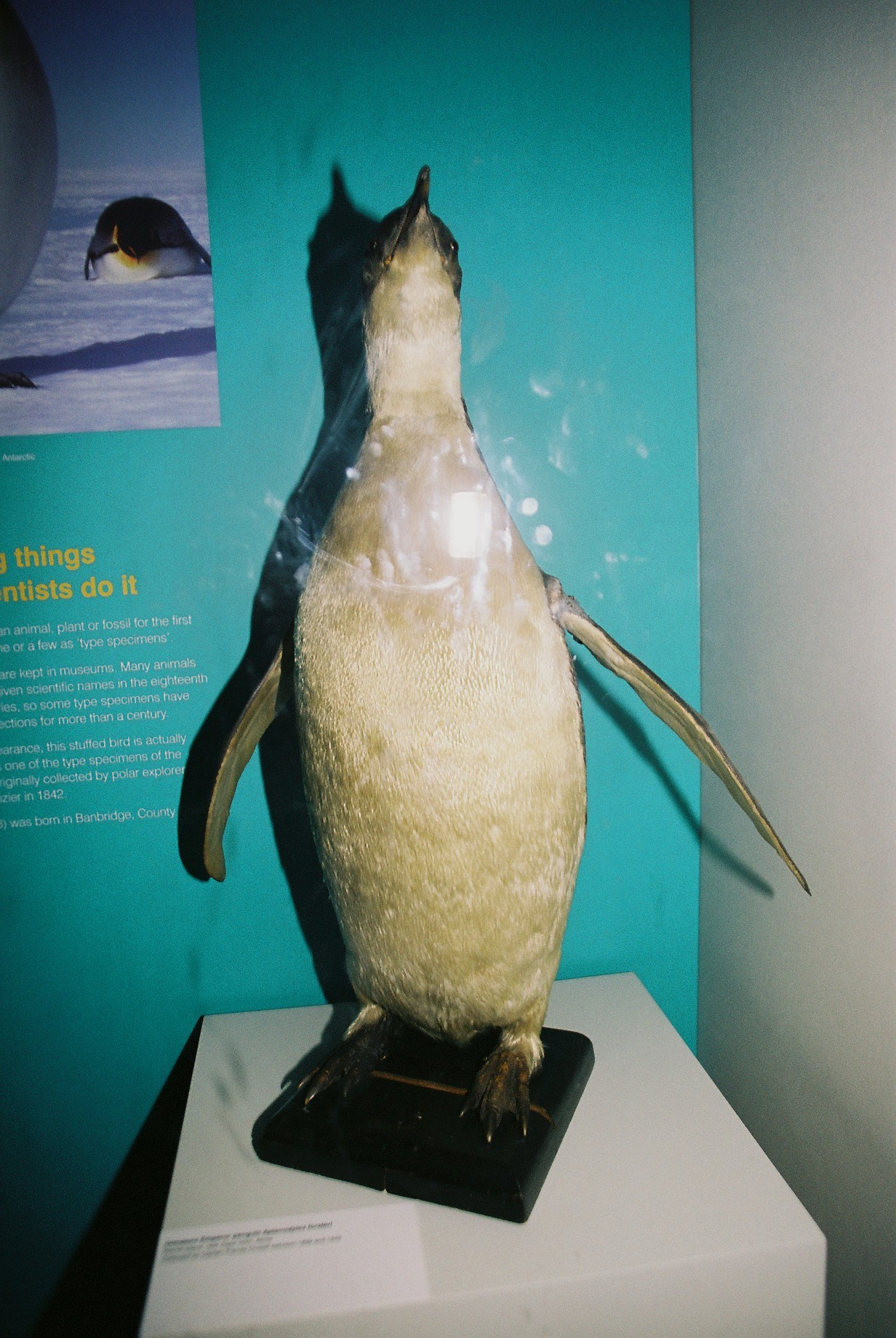
Specimen of an emperor penguin donated to the Belfast Natural History Society by Francis Crozier

Whilst the members of the Society were middle class the museum was open to the working classes, at a small charge on Easter Mondays. Recorded figures for Easter Mondays 1845–1853 are:

1845 – 1,200 persons
1846 – 1,700 persons
1847 – 2,000 persons
1848 – 2,600 persons
1849 – 3,500 persons
1850 – 4,400 persons
1851 – 4,350 persons
1852 – 4,200 persons
1853 – 5,950 persons

== The library ==
With the tumultuous years of 1789–1815, European culture was transformed by revolution, war and disruption. By ending many of the social and cultural props of the previous century, the stage was set for dramatic economic, political and social change of the Late Enlightenment of which the development of learned societies was a part. One of the most important developments that the Enlightenment era brought to the discipline of science was its popularisation. An increasingly literate population seeking knowledge and education in both the arts and the sciences drove the expansion of print culture and the dissemination of scientific learning. Popularization was generally part of an overarching Enlightenment ideal that endeavoured "to make information available to the greatest number of people". As public interest in natural philosophy grew during the 18th century, public lecture courses and the publication of popular texts opened up new roads to money and fame for amateurs and scientists who remained on the periphery of universities and academies. Books owned by the Belfast Natural History Society reflect such changes, although some of the more expensive works were the gift of Thomas Fortescue and Arthur Hill. They included:

- Georges Cuvier, 1829 Regne Animalium, in English, The Animal Kingdom, published by Chez Deterville at Paris; 1832 Class Insecta Whitaker, London
- Justin Pierre Marie Macquart, 1834–1835. Histoire naturelle des insectes. Dipteres Paris : Roret.
- Pierre André LatreilleGenera crustaceorum et insectorum, secundum ordinem naturalem ut familias disposita (4 vols., 1806 1807 1807 1809)
- Peter Simon Pallas Zoographia Rosso-asiatica
- Friedrich Wilhelm Martini Neues systematisches Conchylien-Cabinet;
- Emanuel Mendez da Costa A Natural History of Fossils (1757), Elements of Conchology, or An Introduction to the Knowledge of Shells (1776), British Conchology (1778)
- Gilbert White The Natural History and Antiquities of Selborne (1789)
- Thomas Pennant History of Quadrupeds
- Johannes Allart, Afbeeldingen der fraaiste, meest uitheemsche boomen en heesters. Amsterdam, Johannes Allart, 1802 [-1808];
- William Smith Strata by Organized Fossils (1815);
- Louis Agassiz Recherches sur les poissons fossiles (1833–1843);
- Philipp Franz von Siebold Fauna Japonica: Birds or Aves, 1844–1850 12 vol.; Fish or Pisces 1842–1850 16 vol.; Crustaceans or Crustacea 1833–1850 8 vol.; Mammals or Mammalia 1842–1844 4 vol
- Pierre Barrère Ornithologiae Specimen Novum, sive Series Avium in Ruscinone, Pyrenaeis Montibus, atque in Galliâ Aequinoctiali Observatarum, in Classes, genera & species, novâ methodo, digesta (1745);
- Julius Theodor Christian Ratzeburg Die Waldverderber und ihre Feinde, Berlin, 1841

== Notable members ==
- John Templeton
- Robert Templeton
- James MacAdam
- Robert Shipboy MacAdam
- Thomas Graves R.N.
- Charles Wyville Thomson
- Ralph Tate
- James Bryce
- Thomas Andrews
- Thomas Workman
- John Grainger
- James Emerson Tennent
- John Grattan
- George Dickie
- James Grimshaw (naturalist)
- William Thomas Braithwaite

== Gallery ==
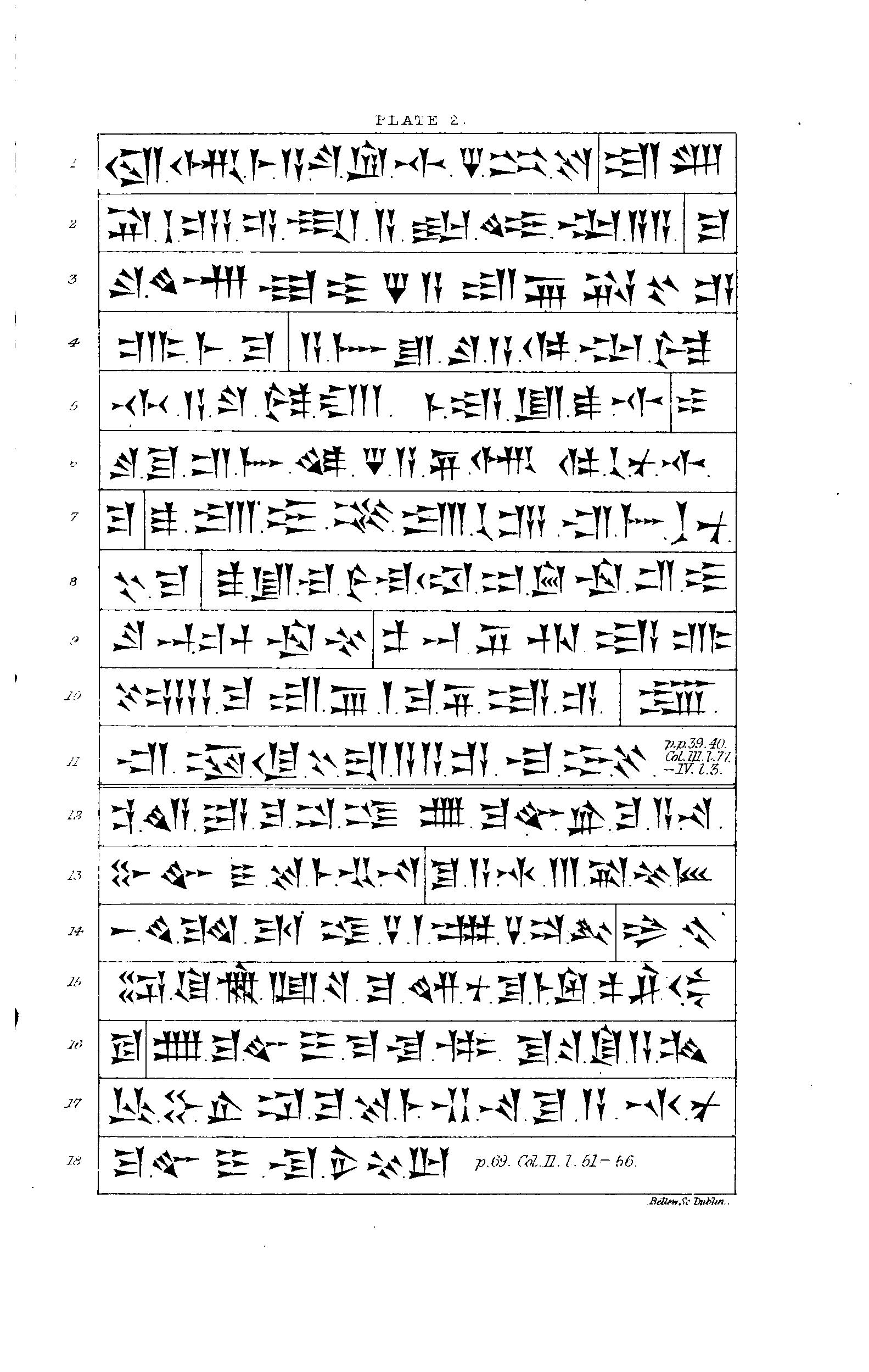
Plate from On the Polyphony of the Assyrio-Babylonian Cuneiform Writing Edward Hincks

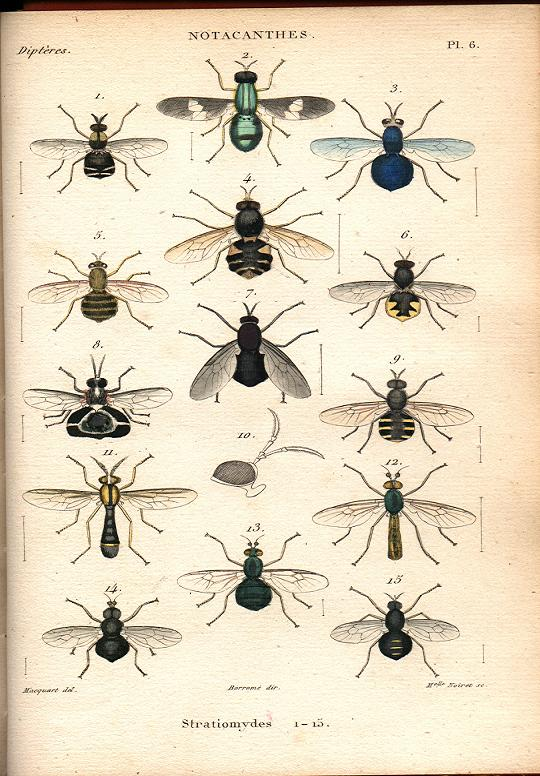
A plate from Histoire naturelle des insectes. Dipteres

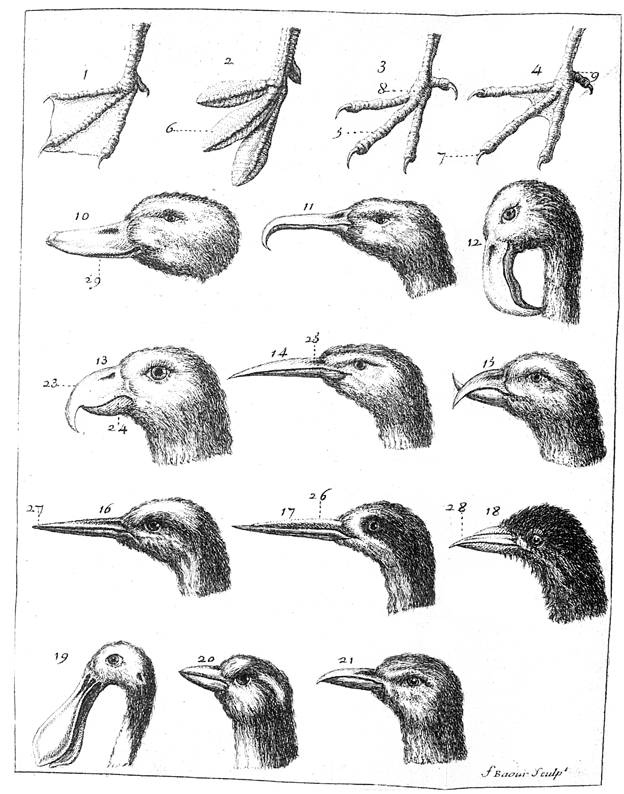
Plate from Ornithologiae Specimen Novum

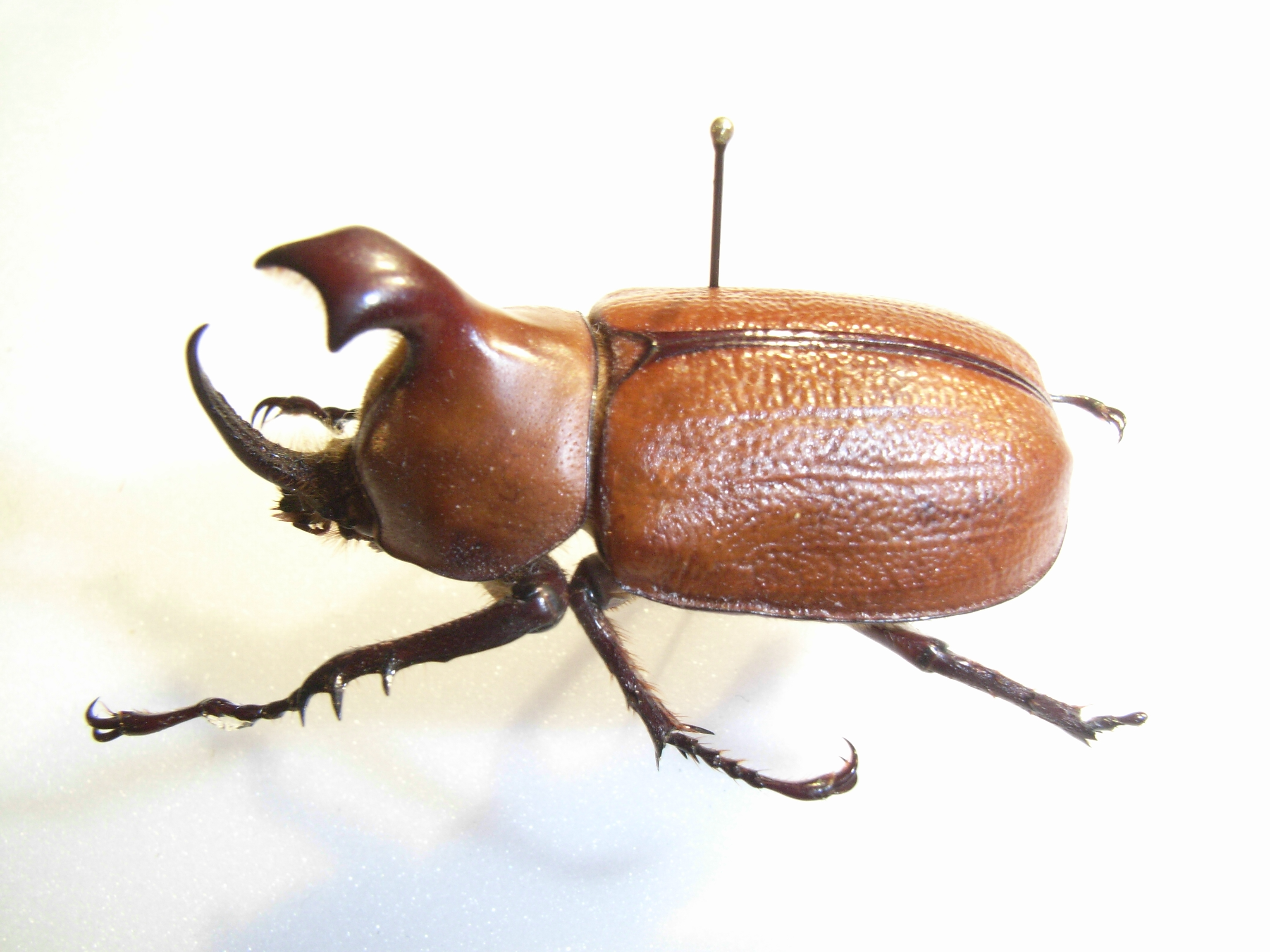
Golofa A beetle from South America

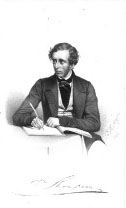
William Thompson's Natural History of Ireland was a favourite book of Charles Darwin.

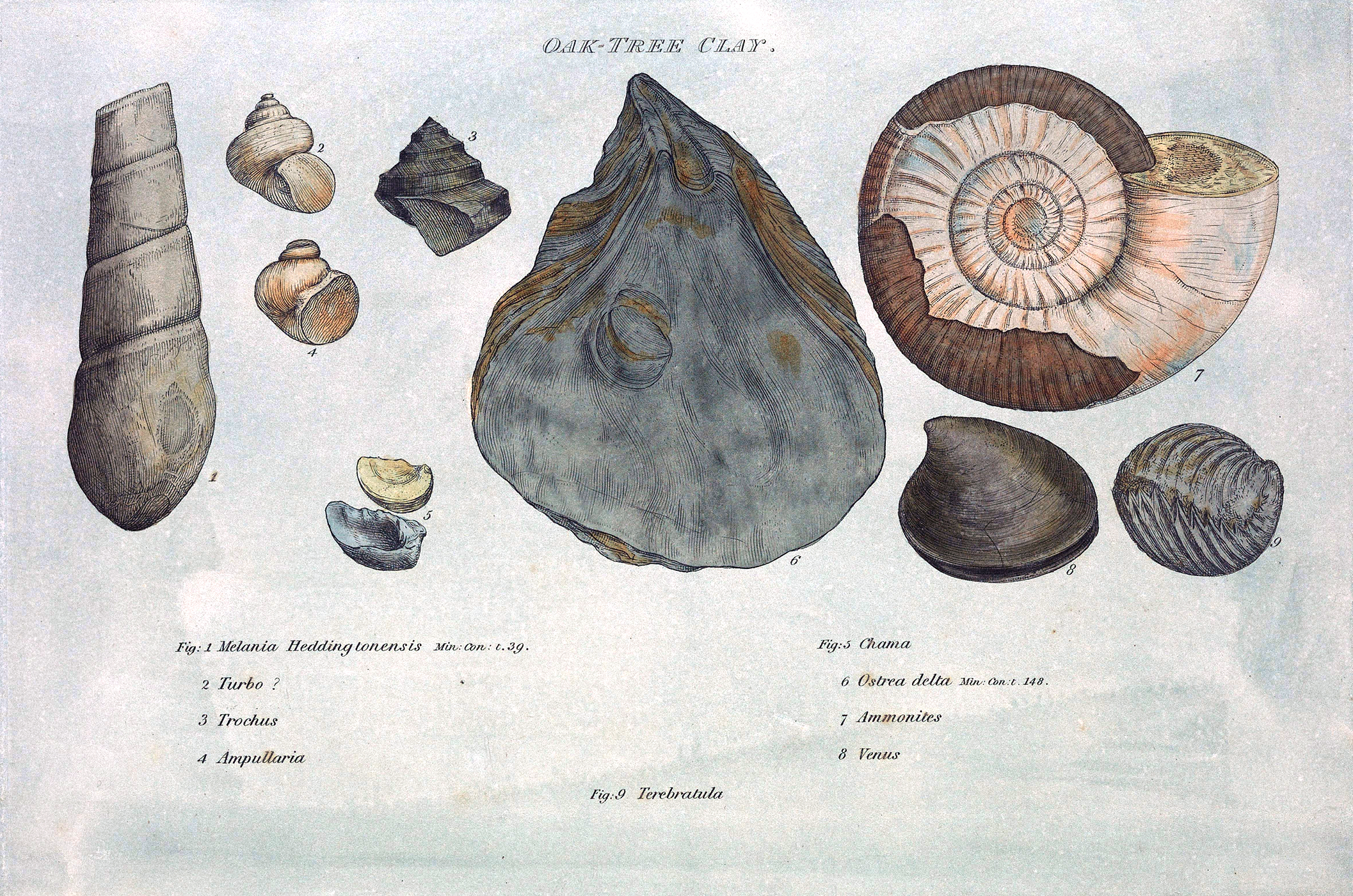
A plate from William Smith's 1816-1819 work Strata by Organized Fossils

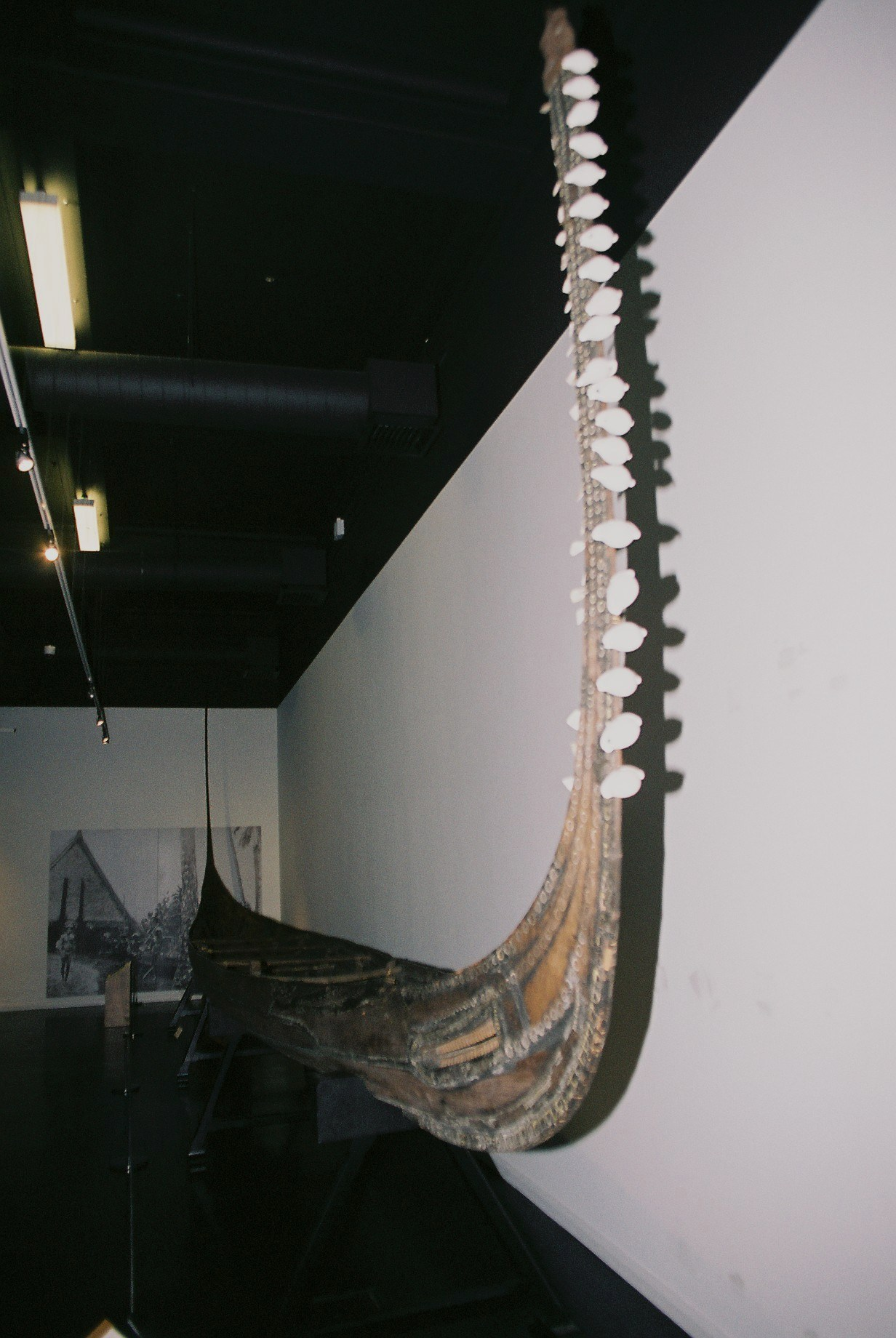
Solomon Islands war canoe presented to BNHS by Rear Admiral John Casement in 1898.

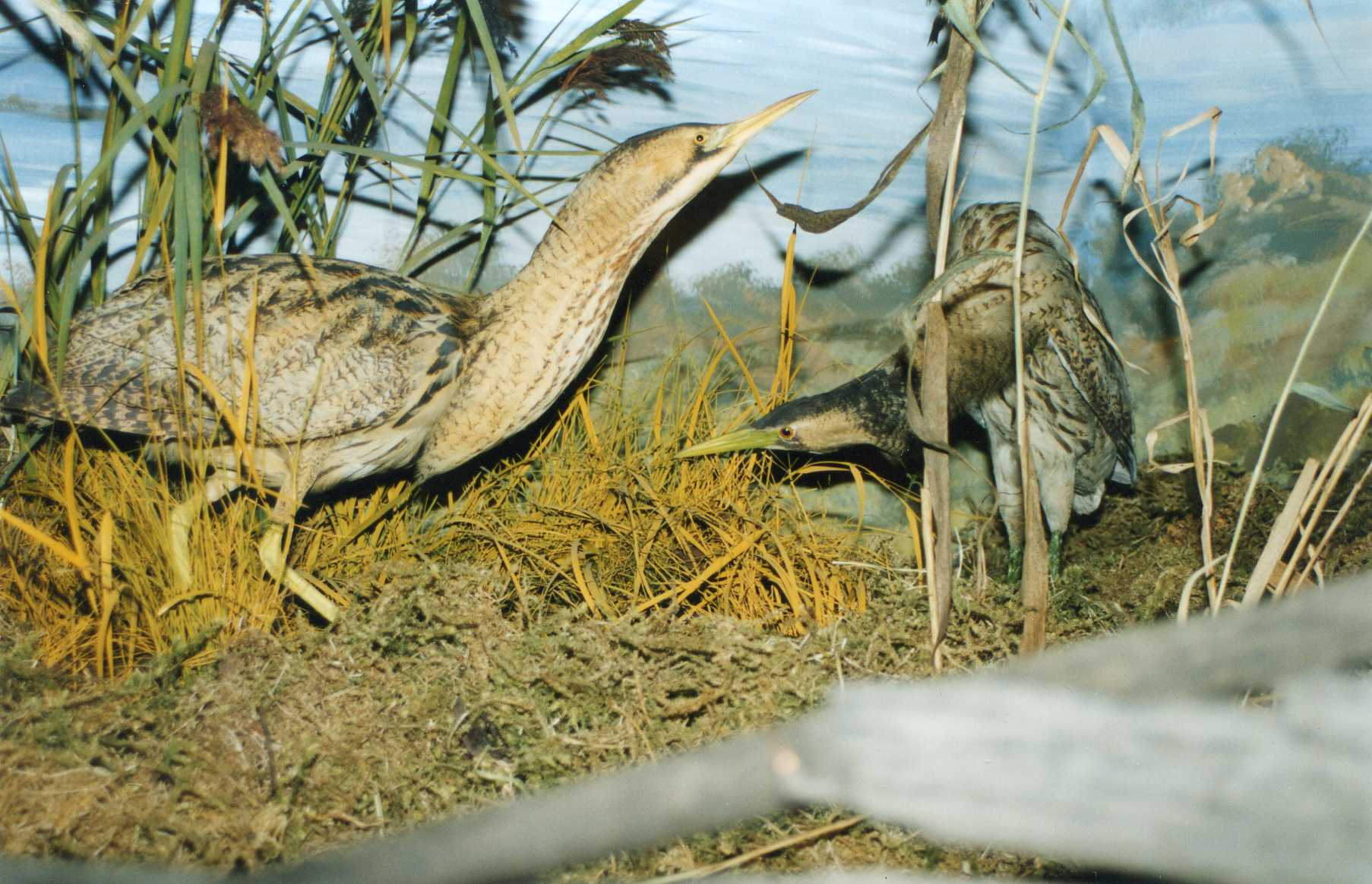
Bitterns from the BNHPS Collection

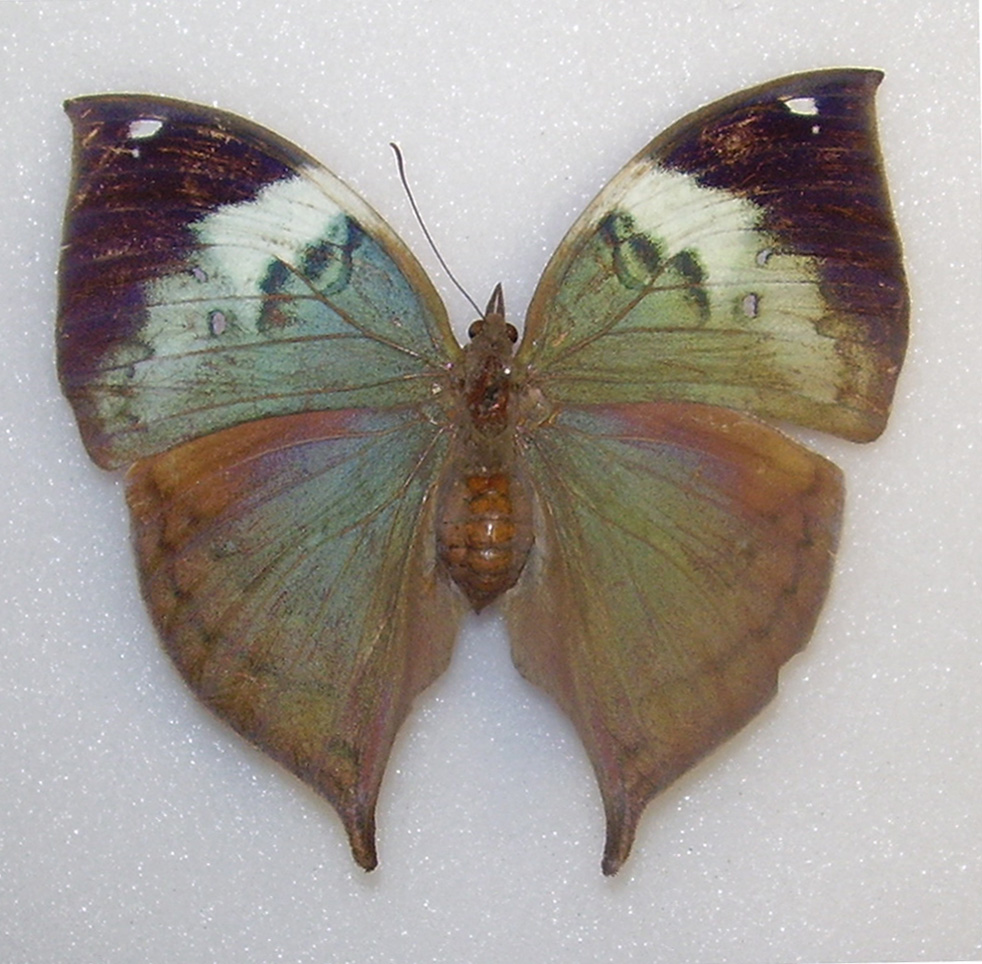
Specimen of Kallima philarchus collected by Robert Templeton

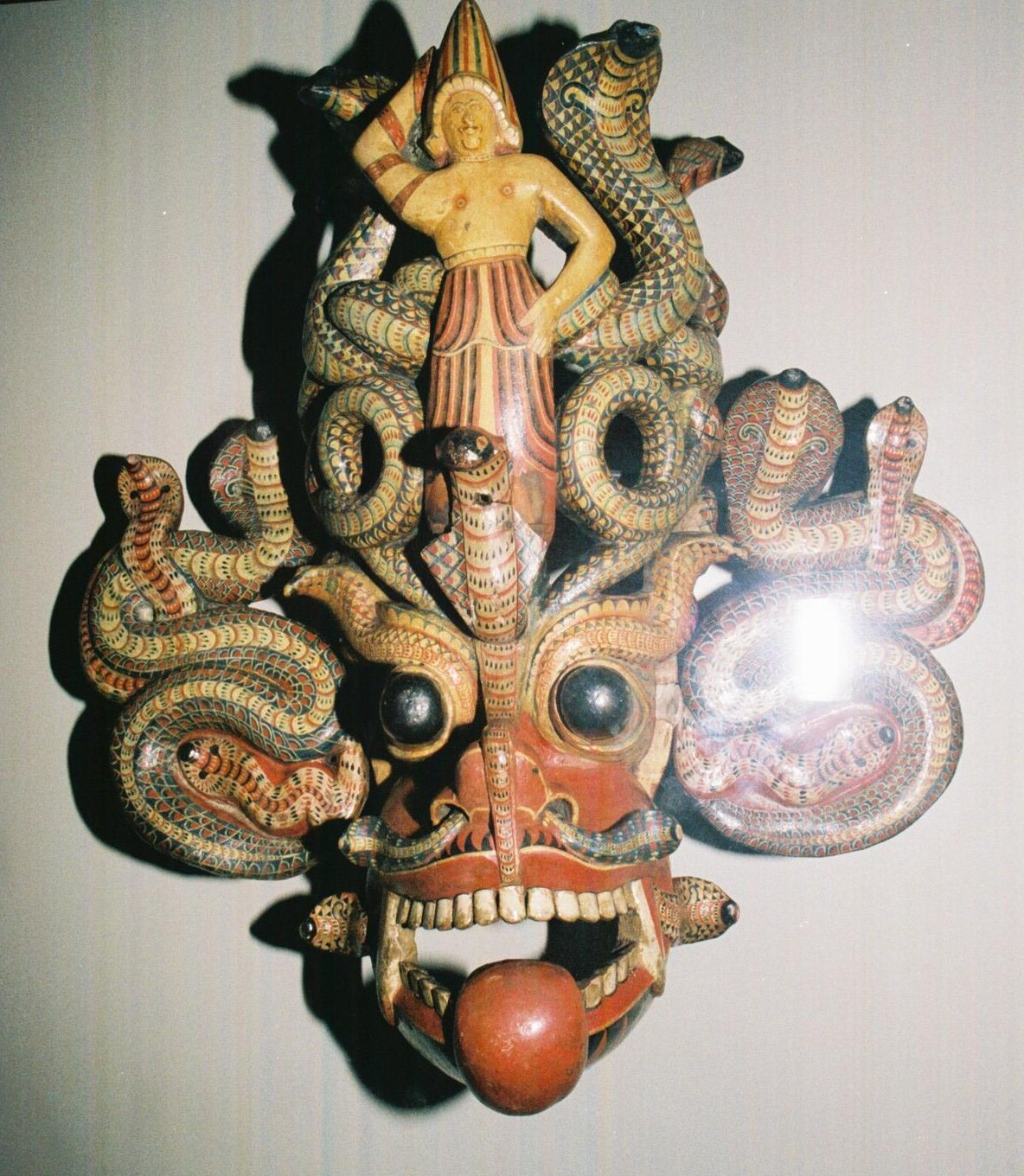
Cobra Mask from Ceylon donated by James Emerson Tennent

== See also ==
- William Bullock A companion to Mr. Bullock's London Museum and Pantherion 1812 gives a notion of an early 19th-century museum, though not a scientific one.
- Literary and Philosophical Society of Newcastle upon Tyne
- Leskean Cabinet
- Dublin University Zoological Association
- Cuvierian Society of Cork
