= Edmund Getty =

Irish antiquarian and naturalist (1799–1857)

Edmund Getty MRIA (2 March 1799 in Belfast – 4 December 1857 in London) was an Irish antiquarian and naturalist.

He was the only surviving son of Robert Getty and his wife Susanna Grimshaw; Robert was a founder of the Belfast Academical Institution and the Belfast Reading Society.

Getty was educated at the Royal Belfast Academical Institution. He became Ballast Master of the Belfast Ballast Board and, later, Secretary of the Belfast Harbour Board. He was responsible for the reclamation of slob-lands in County Down and building of a "Crystal Palace" park.

He was a founder member of the Belfast Natural History Society and one of the founders of Belfast Botanic Gardens. He published papers on silkworms, birds, plants and topography. He was a member of the Royal Irish Academy. He was also president of the Belfast Literary Society twice.

Getty died on 4 December 1857 of a heart attack; he was unmarried.

== Publications ==
He wrote Chinese Seals in Ireland, The History of the Harbour Board, Last King of Ulster (a novel) and articles on Tory Island. His work ‘The round towers of Ulster’ was privately printed by Anne and Mary Grattan, daughters of his friend John Grattan.
