= Regius Professor of Botany (Aberdeen) =

Regius Professor of Botany is a regius professorship at the University of Aberdeen in Scotland.

== List of Regius Professors of Botany ==
- 1860 to 1877: George Dickie
- 1877 to 1919: James W. H. Trail
- 1920 to 1933: William Grant Craib
- 1934 to 1959: James Robert Matthews
- 1959 to 1981: Paul Egerton Weatherley
- 1982 to 1988: Charles Henry Gimingham
- 1996 to 2010: Ian Alexander
