= George Dickie (botanist) =

Scottish botanist (1812–1882)

George Dickie FRS, FLS (23 Nov 1812, Aberdeen – 15 July 1882) was a Scottish botanist, who specialised in algae.

== Life ==
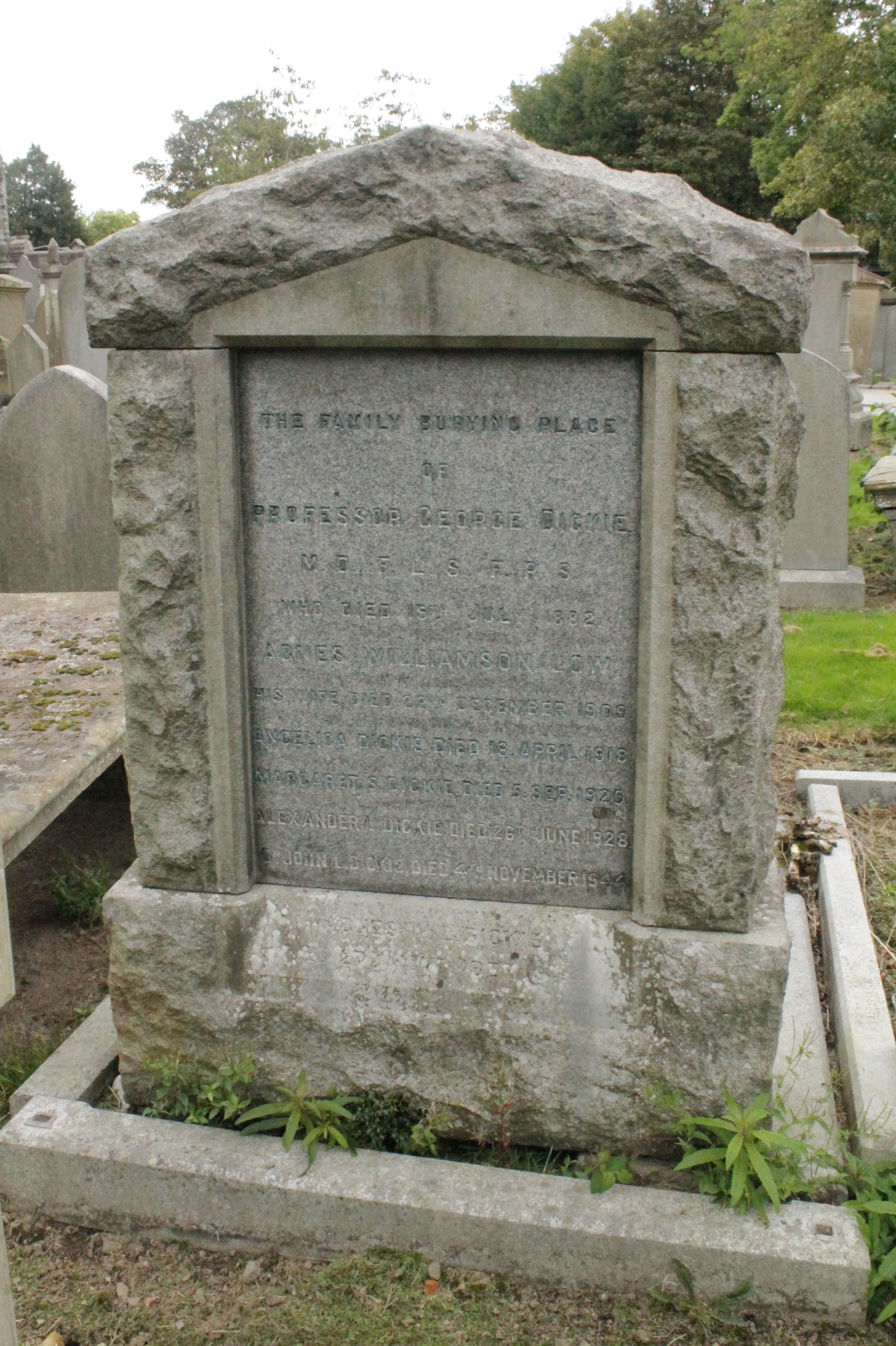
The grave of Prof George Dickie, St Machar's Cathedral

He studied arts, then medicine at the Universities of Aberdeen and Edinburgh. He qualified as a doctor around 1835. In 1837 he is listed as a surgeon, living at Cherryvale in Aberdeen.

He became a lecturer on botany in King's College, Aberdeen, then University Librarian. In 1849 he was appointed the first Professor of Natural History at Queen's College, Belfast and became a Member of the Belfast Natural History Society. In 1860 he returned to Aberdeen University as Regius Professor of Botany. He was succeeded in 1877 by Prof James William Helenus Trail FRS.

Dickie worked, most importantly on the range and depth of marine algae and on cataloguing material brought back from the Challenger expedition.

Dickie was a Fellow of the Linnean Society (1863), a Fellow of the Royal Society (1881) and a Member of the Belfast Natural History Society.

In later life he lived at 16 Albyn Terrace in Aberdeen.

He died on 15 July 1882 at is buried in the churchyard of St Machar's Cathedral in Old Aberdeen. The grave lies south west of the church.

He was succeeded by Prof James W. H. Trail.

== Family ==
He was married to Agnes Willamson Low (d.1909).
