= Francis Archer =

Irish physician and naturalist

Francis Archer MRCS (1803–1875) was an Irish physician and naturalist.

He was born in Belfast on 23 April 1803, the son of a well-known Belfast bookseller. He studied medicine at Edinburgh. He practiced in Liverpool, where he was the prison surgeon.

As a naturalist, he specialized in conchology, initiating what became the basis for a large family collection, some of which later became part of the Birmingham Museum and Art Gallery and also the Melvill-Tomlin collection of Amgueddfa Cymru - Museum Wales.

Archer was one of the founder members of the Belfast Natural History and Philosophical Society. Later he became the first President of the Liverpool Natural History Society. He was a member of the Liverpool Literary and Philosophical Society. He also was a member of the Belfast Phrenological Society.

He died on 5 April 1875.

== Family ==
He was married to Frances Fletcher. They had six children.

His two sons continued the work of their father;

- Francis Archer Jr. (1839–92), a solicitor, journalist and naturalist who collected Mollusca which he obtained on trips to Puffin Island and Liverpool, in conjunction with research activities of the Liverpool Biological Society;
- Samuel Archer, (1836–1902), an Army surgeon and ship's surgeon on the SS Great Britain, who collected shells in Singapore and many other parts of the world where he traveled, both with his regiment and in retirement.
