= John Grattan (naturalist) =

Irish naturalist and anthropologist

John Grattan (1800 − 24 April 1871) was an Irish naturalist and anthropologist.

Grattan was born in Dublin in 1800. He trained as an apothecary in Dublin, and after travelling to Belfast, opened the ‘Grattan & Co Medical Hall’ in Belfast High Street in 1825. Three years later, he opened a factory producing mineral waters and fizzy drinks.

Grattan had wide interests in natural history and was a member of the Belfast Natural History Society. He is best known for his work on ancient Irish skulls collected by his friend Edmund Getty. He devised a system of skull measurements using an ingenious craniometer. This work was published in ‘The Ulster Journal of Archaeology’ in 1853.

He died on 24 April 1871 and was buried in Clifton Street cemetery in Belfast; his collection of skulls was given to the Belfast Museum.

"Grattan's work was almost contemporaneous with that of Anders Retzius, and nearly all of it was done before the German and French Schools had elaborated their schemes of skull measurements."

== Family ==
He married Harriet Shaw and they had five daughters.

One daughter married Mr R. W. Pring; Pring and his sons went on to work with Grattan.
