= Ouley Hill =

Irish geological feature

Coordinates: 54°29′25″N 5°52′6″W

Ouley: Irish: Baile Eochaille ‘townland of the yew-wood’
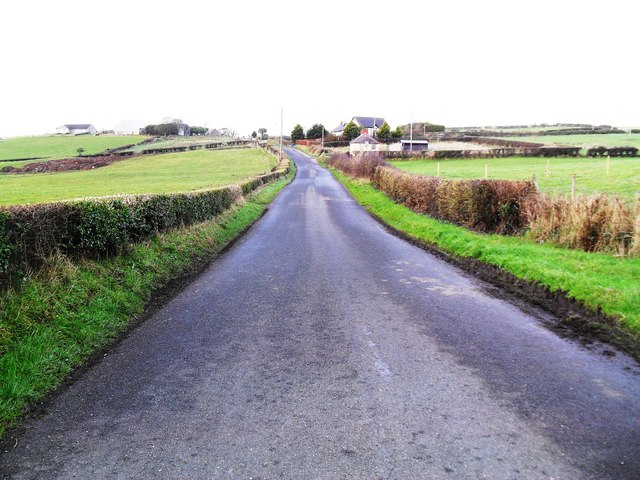
- View toward Ouley Hill along the Killynure Road

- Location within County Down
- Irish grid reference: J382625
- District: Newry, Mourne and Down
- County: County Down
- Country: Northern Ireland
- Sovereign state: United Kingdom
- Post town: SAINTFIELD
- Postcode district: BT24
- Dialling code: 028
- UK Parliament: South Down
- NI Assembly: South Down

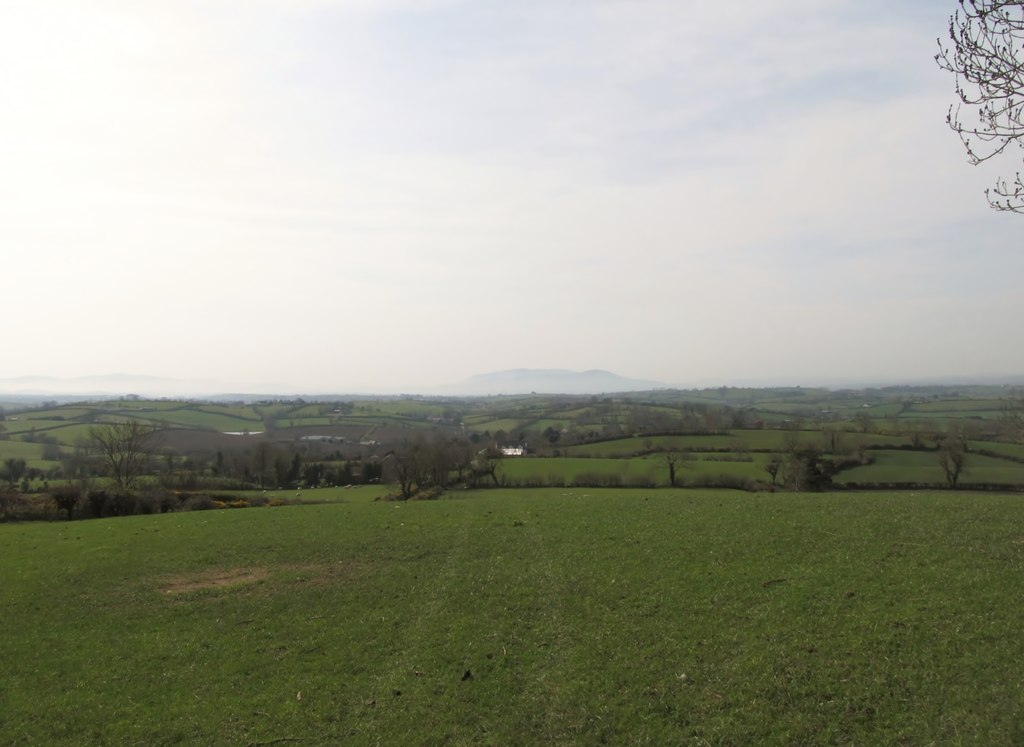
Ouley Townland viewed from Ouley Hill

Ouley Hill is a 186-metre (610 ft) summit located in the Belfast Hills within the townland of Ouley, County Down, Northern Ireland, between Carryduff and Saintfield. The hill has a prominence of 110 metres and is classified as a HuMP (Hundred Metre Prominence). The summit area consists of pastureland near a quarry fence and lacks a distinct summit marker. The townland of Ouley, covering 225.8 acres, derives its name from the Irish Baile Eochaille, meaning "townland of the yew-wood," or Eochoillidh, meaning "yew wood." It lies within the civil parish of Saintfield and the historic barony of Castlereagh Upper. Ouley Hill is accessible via Killinure Road, which crosses its highest point, with additional access from surrounding roads including Ouley Road. Its parent peak is Slieve Croob, and it is mapped at grid reference J382625.

== History ==
=== Chieftains ===
Chief of the Ander kindred (Ui nDerca Chein), Mac Gilmori, from Oly is noted for assisting William Fitz Warin, seneschal of Ulster, during a rebellion in 1273. He is likely the same person as Dermot, son of Gilla Muire O'Morna, who died in 1276. Another chieftain of that territory with the same name, Mac Gilla Muire, is recorded as having died in 1391 while serving as King of Ui nDerca Chein. Historians believe Ui nDerca Chein refers to the area now known as the barony of Upper Castlereagh in County Down. The name "Oly" is probably a reference to Ouley, a townland in the parish of Saintfield within that barony, which may have been the residence of the chieftain.

=== Irish Rebellion of 1798 ===
Ouley Hill was the site of an insurgent encampment during the Irish Rebellion of 1798. In June of that year, rebel forces gathered in the area as part of the broader uprising against British rule. The insurgents, numbering over a thousand, were involved in a confrontation with British forces in the area, and the terrain around Ouley Hill, including wooded slopes and elevated ground, provided strategic cover for their ambush in the Battle of Saintfield.

In close proximity to Ouley Hill, in the townland of Lessans, a pike-head was later recovered from the thatched roof of a house. Lessans lies approximately one mile from Saintfield and near the former rebel encampment. This discovery is a notable example of the "pikes in the thatch" tradition, a recurring theme in oral histories of the 1798 Rebellion, referring to the concealment of weapons in rural homes.

== Geography ==
Townlands that border Ouley Hill include:

- Carricknaveagh to the south
- Craignasasonagh to the south
- Drumalig to the west
- Killinure to the west
- Lessans to the east
- Lisdoonan to the north

== See also ==
- List of townlands in County Down
