= Waring, Texas =

- Unincorporated community
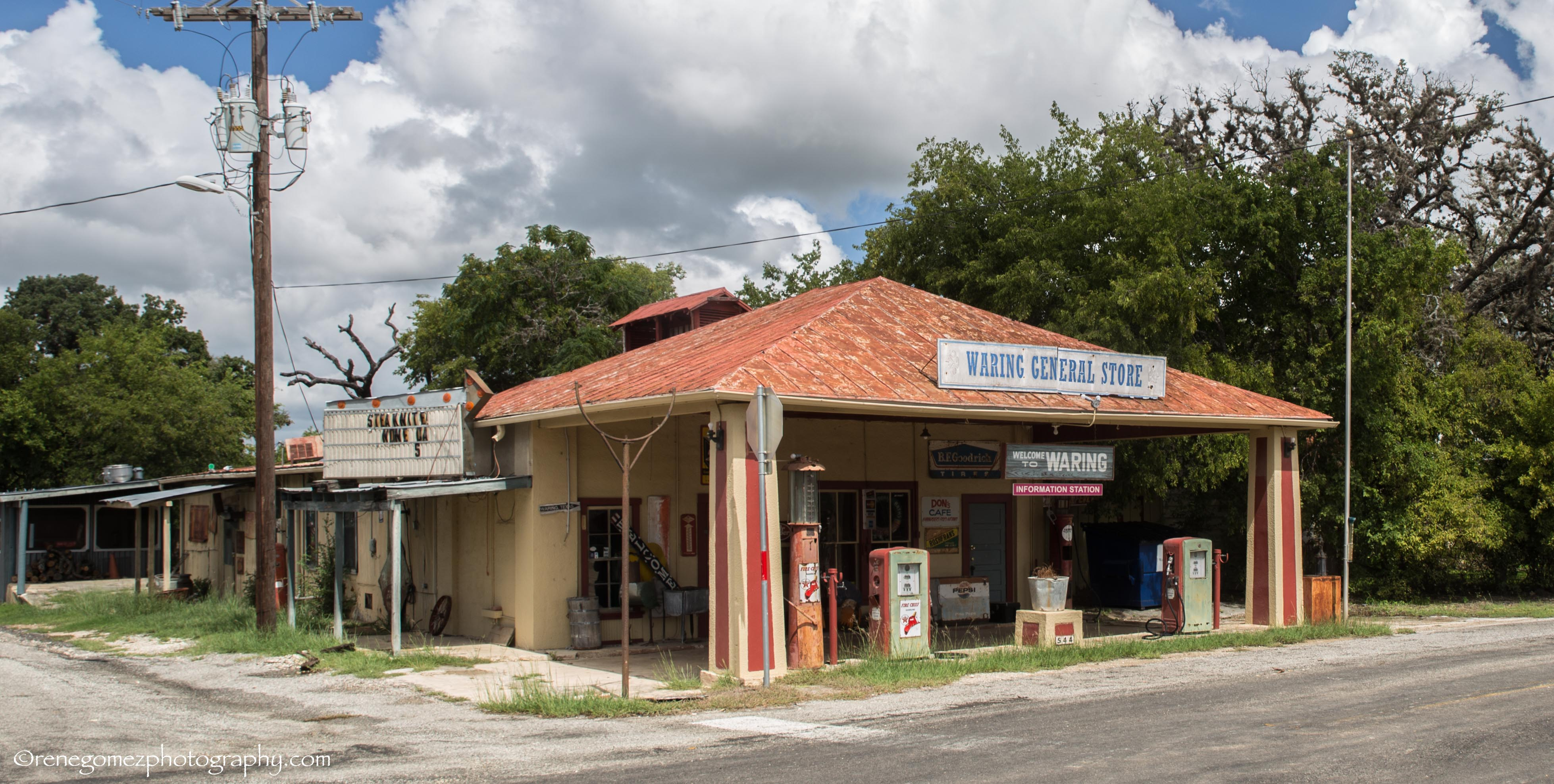
- Old gas station in Waring

- Location in Texas and the United States Waring (the United States)
- Coordinates: 29°57′3″N 98°48′11″W
- Country: United States
- State: Texas
- County: Kendall
- Named for: Waringsford, Northern Ireland
- Elevation: 1,345 ft (410 m)
- Time zone: UTC-6 (Central (CST))
  - Summer (DST): UTC-5 (CDT)
- ZIP code: 78074
- GNIS feature ID: 1349492

Waring is an unincorporated community in northwestern Kendall County, Texas, United States. It lies along local roads and the Guadalupe River, northwest of the city of Boerne, the county seat of Kendall County. Its elevation is 1,345 feet (410 m). Although Waring is unincorporated, it has a post office, with the ZIP code of 78074; the ZCTA for ZIP Code 78074 had a population of 59 at the 2000 census. The community is part of the San Antonio Metropolitan Statistical Area.

Founded in 1887 by R. P. M. Waring, the community was named for its founder's hometown of Waringsford in Ireland; the name was not changed until 1901. From its foundation until service ceased in 1970, the community was a station on the Kerrville branch of the San Antonio and Aransas Pass Railway.

== Major roads ==
- Waring Welfare Road
- Farm to Market Road 1621

Historical population
Census	Pop.	Note	%±
1890	100		—
1900	150		50.0%
1910	200		33.3%
1920	300		50.0%
1930	284		−5.3%
1950	80		—
1970	73		—
1990	73		—
2000	59		−19.2%
2010	73		23.7%

== Gallery ==
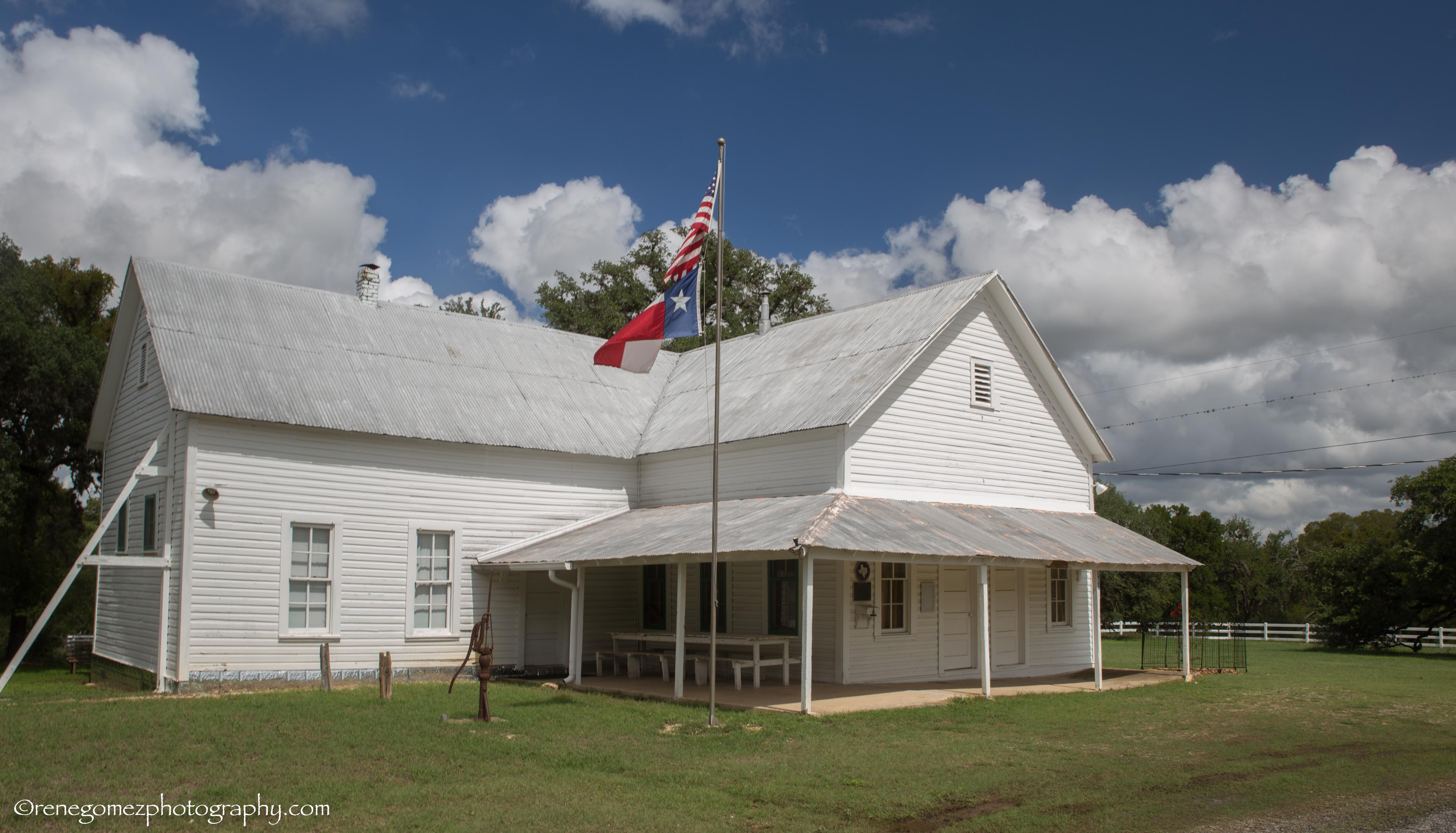
Waring School

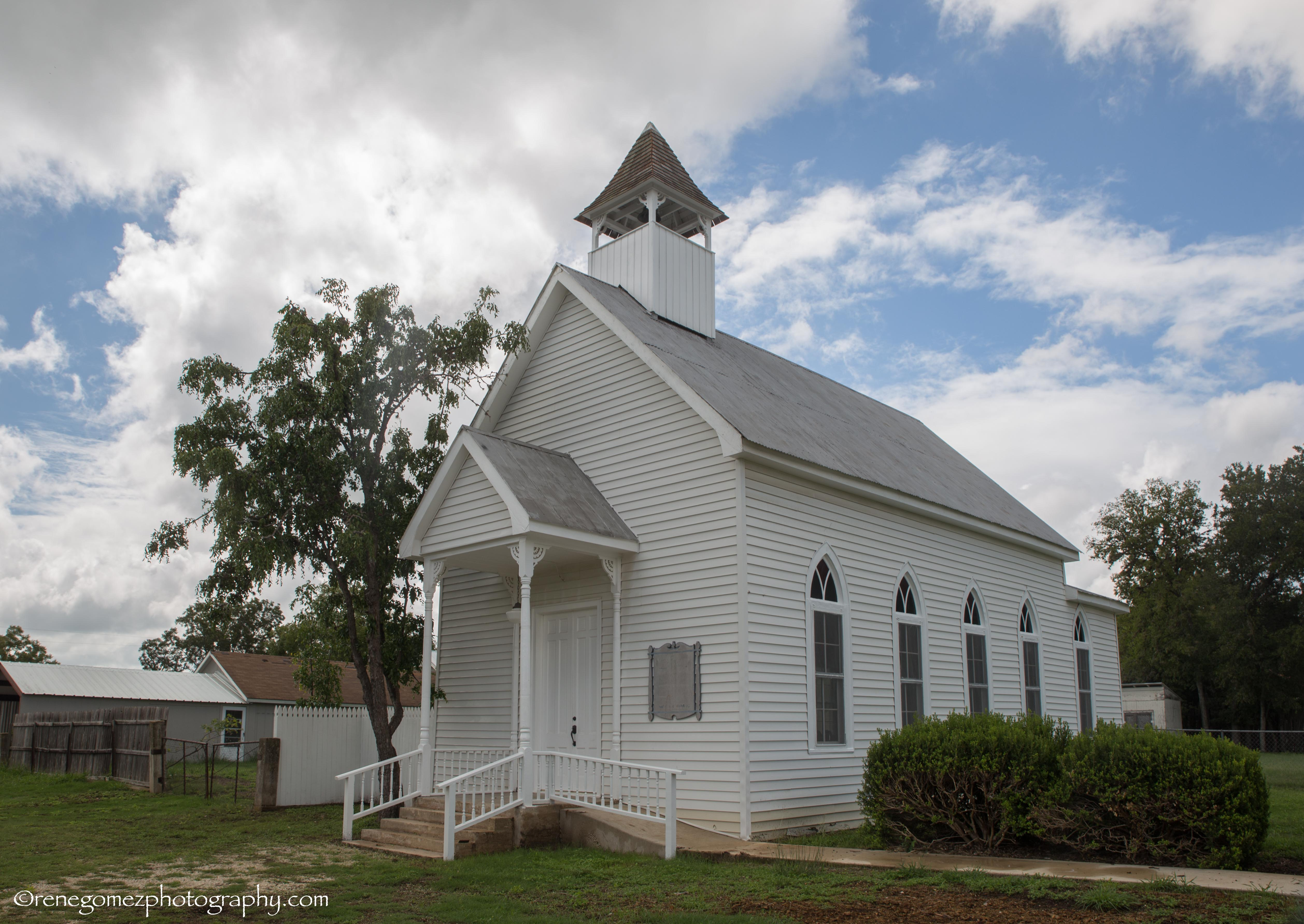
Waring Church

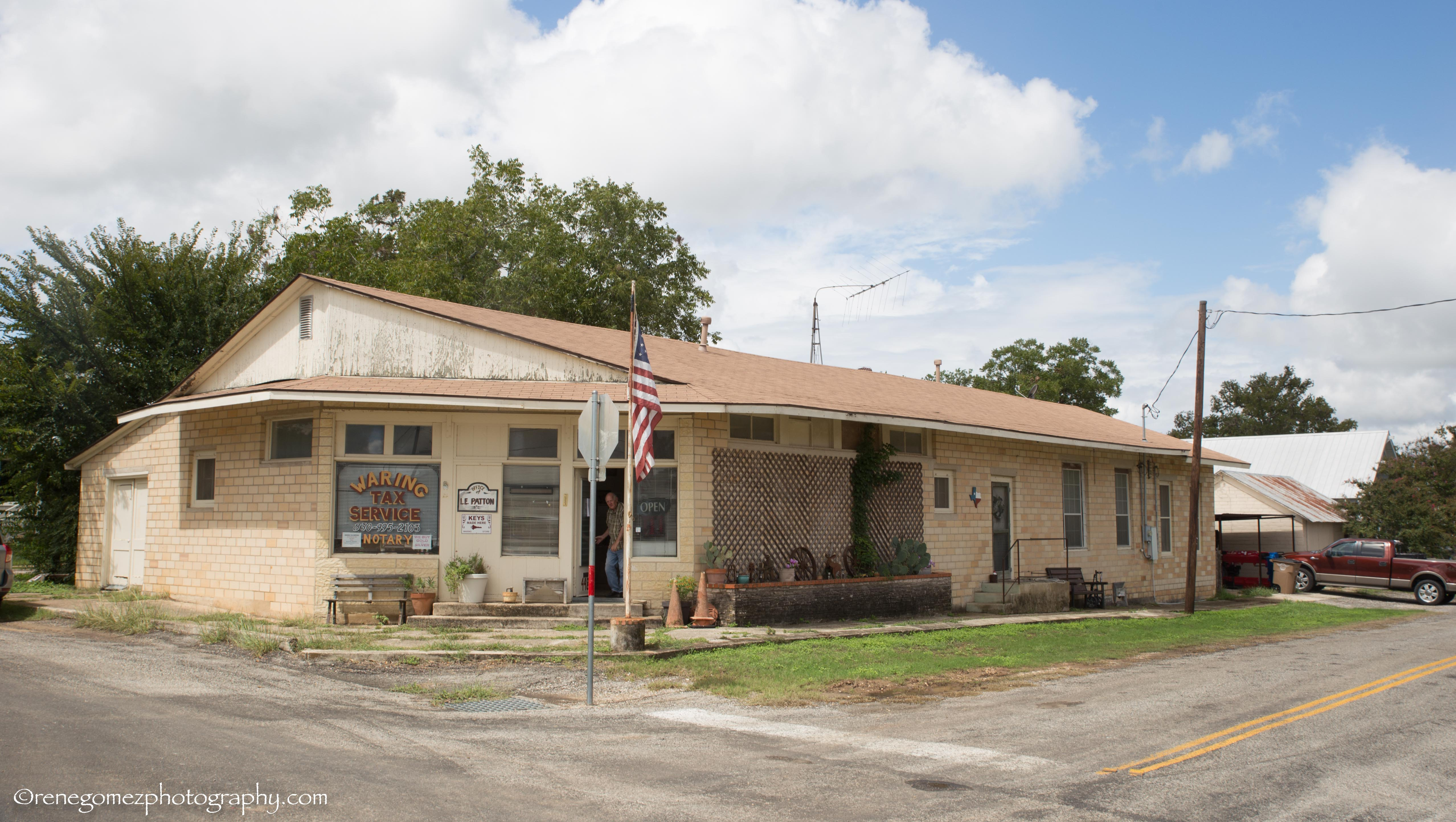
Office building
