= Edward Newell =

Edward Newell may refer to:

- Edward Theodore Newell (1886–1941), president of the American Numismatic Society
- Edward Newell (cyclist), British Olympic cyclist
- Edward John Newell (1771–1798), member of the Society of United Irishmen, turned informer and was assassinated
