= Rowallane Garden =

Historic garden in Northern Ireland

Coordinates: 54.447°N 5.828°W

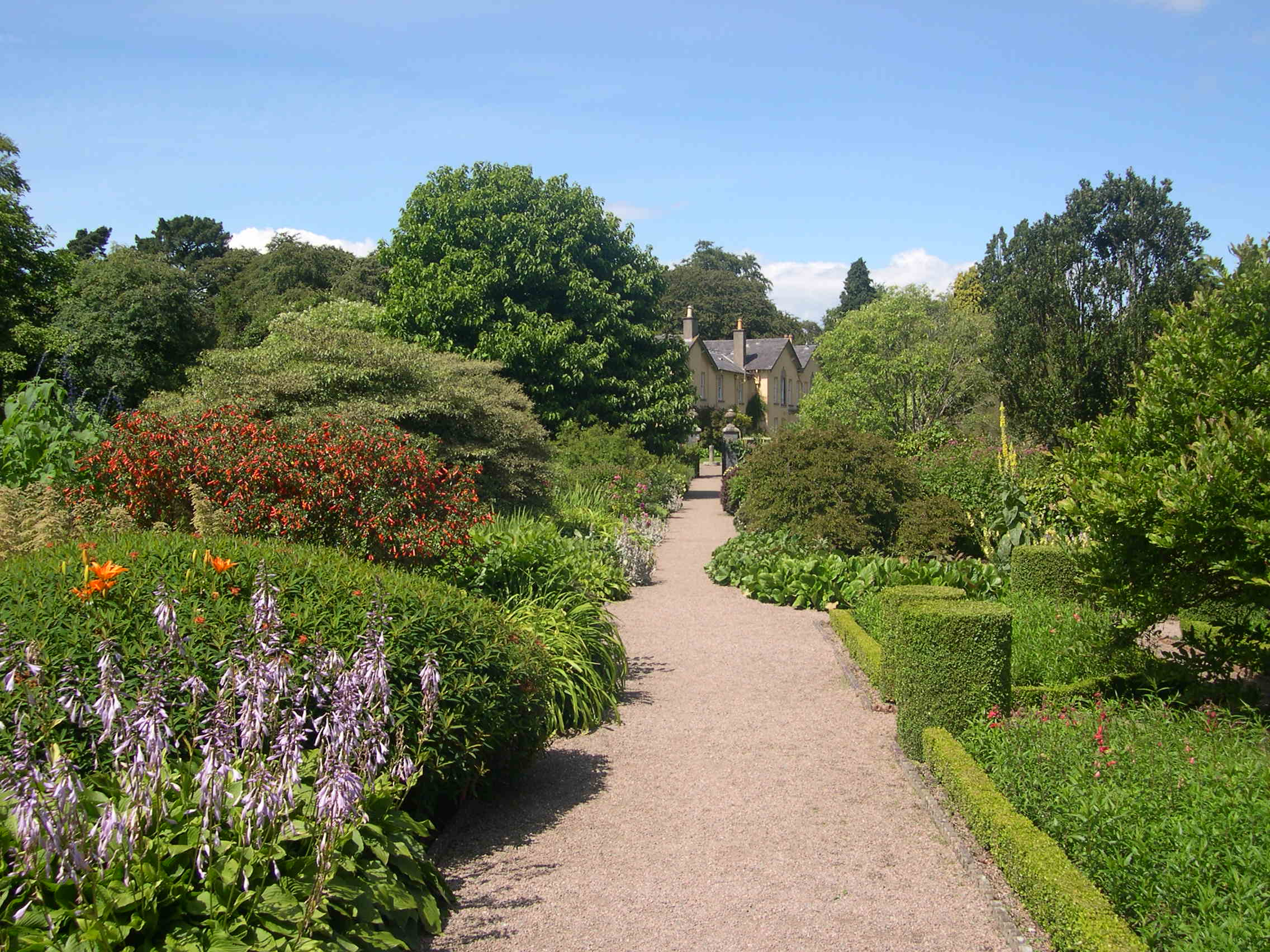
The Walled Garden

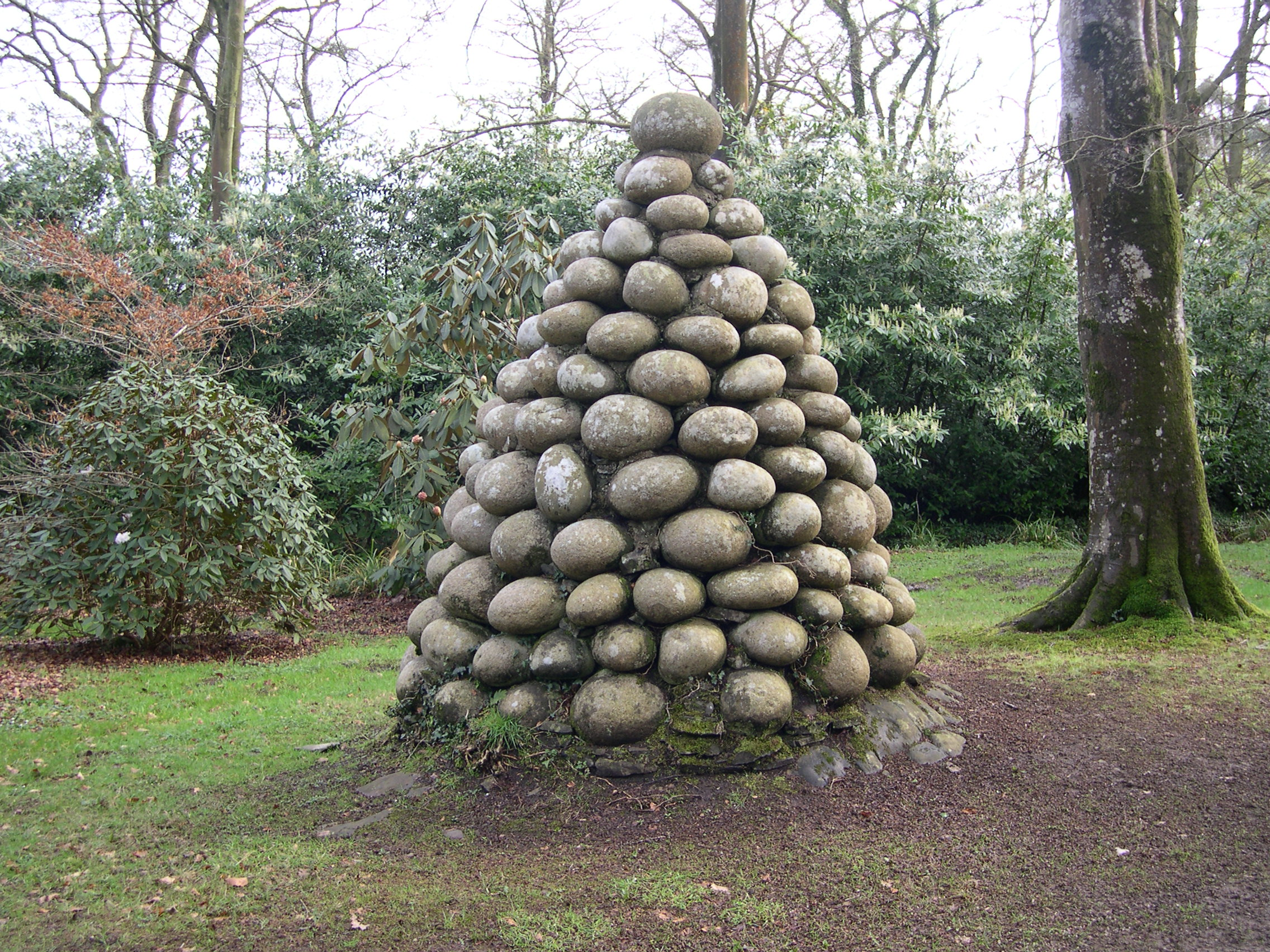
Arrangement of stones

Rowallane Garden is a National Trust property located immediately south of Saintfield, County Down, Northern Ireland, on the A7 road. It is particularly noted for its extensive collection of azaleas and rhododendrons. It is also home to the National Collection of penstemons. It was officially opened on 16 May 1956 by Cynthia, Viscountess Brookeborough, after being taken over by the National Trust in July 1955.

== Features ==
The Garden, of some 50 acres in total, features a walled garden, rock garden woods, wildflower meadows, two walking paths, a bell tower, and a tea room. The estate house is the headquarters of the National Trust in Northern Ireland.

== History ==
The Garden was laid out from the mid-1860s by the Reverend John Moore. He built a walled garden, created the Pleasure Grounds and planted many trees. In 1903 the garden passed to his nephew, Hugh Armytage Moore.
