= William Sinclair (United Irishmen) =

Irish Presbyterian minister and radical democrat

Reverend William Sinclair (died 1830) was an Irish Presbyterian minister and, as a radical democrat, a member of the Society of United Irishmen. Forced after the rebellion of 1798 into American exile, he became a leading figure in the Irish immigrant community in Baltimore.

== Early life ==
Probably the fourth son of William Sinclair, a farmer in Kilcronaghan parish, County Londonderry, Sinclair graduated from the University of Glasgow (then a centre of the Scottish Enlightenment) in 1775. By 1786 he was preaching in Newtownards, County Down, in a congregation within the non-subscribing Presbytery of Antrim.

== United Irishmen and 1798 Rebellion ==
On 14 October 1791, he was one of 12 men including Henry Joy McCracken and Wolfe Tone who met to form the Belfast Society of the United Irishmen. In time his brothers George and Thomas would also join. He fell under the suspicion of Lord Castlereagh, his congregant, former student and son and heir to the leading landowner in north Down, the Earl of Londonderry. In November 1796 Castlereagh wrote to his wife that "Sinclair has been playing a most artful game, and has done much to mislead." Later that month, however, Castlereagh reported on a successful meeting where several hundred of the inhabitants of Newtownards and district took the oath of allegiance. Afterwards "we had a very jolly dinner: Cleland quite drunk, Sinclair considerably so, my father not a little, others lying heads and points, the whole very happy, and ‘God Save the King’ and ‘Rule Britannia’ declared permanent."

During the Rebellion, Sinclair was part of an insurgent committee in Newtownards, though it was afterwards claimed that the minister was less than a willing participant in this. After the arrest of Reverend William Steel Dickson on the eve of the Battle of Ballynahinch in June 1798, his brother George Sinclair was briefly the declared Adjutant General of the United forces of County Down.

Following the rising, Sinclair's manse was looted and torched, and he was imprisoned on the prison ship Postlethwaite, a former coal-tender anchored in Belfast Lough, along with ministers Thomas Ledlie Birch, William Steel Dickson, Robert Steele and James Simpson, and the licentiate David Bailie Warden (who had led the rebel attack on Newtownards). Together they were permitted American exile.

== America ==
In May 1799, Sinclair set sail for New York on the Peggy, along with Simpson and Warden, and John Caldwell. Before his departure, Sinclair received a certificate of ordination from the Presbytery of Antrim, signed by the Moderator. But as was the case for Thomas Ledlie Birch, Sinclair found his radical politics a bar to ministry in the United States. Instead Sinclair opened a school, Baltimore Academy. In 1808, this academy along with another run by a fellow Presbyterian minister, Samuel Knox, were merged with Baltimore College of which fellow United Irishman Doctor John Campbell White was a founder and trustee. Sinclair served as college vice president and Professor of Logic and Rhetoric.

In 1810, alongside White, Sinclair served on the presiding committee of Baltimore Hibernian Benevolent Society; the following year, he became the society’s secretary. Consistent with the general anti-Federalism of the Irish immigrant community, the Society aligned with Thomas Jefferson's Republican-Democratic Party. With Jefferson, he interceded on behalf of David Bailie Warden when, as U.S. consul in Paris, he fell out with the Madison administration.

Sinclair also engaged in the cultural life of Baltimore; in 1816 he was one of the organizers and first president of the literary society, the Delphian Club. He died in the city in 1830.
