= Betsy Gray =

Irish folkloric figure

Elizabeth "Betsy" Gray
- Miniature attributed to Edward John Newell
- Born: c 1778 or 14 January 1780; Gransha at Comber, or Killinchy or Waringsford County Down, Ireland
- Died: 12 June 1798; Battle of Ballynahinch
- Cause of death: Summarily executed by government Yeomanry
- Movement: Society of United Irishmen

Elizabeth Gray (c. 1778 or 1780 - 1798), is a folkloric figure in the annals of the 1798 Rebellion in Ireland. Ballads, poems and popular histories celebrate her presence in the ranks of the United Irishmen, and her death, on 12 June 1798 at the Battle of Ballynahinch. Contemporary records are unable to confirm the tale that has been told in all its detail, but they do point to the role of women in supporting the insurrection, including as combatants in the field. Contesting ownership of her memory, in 1898 local unionists disrupted Irish nationalist centenary commemorations and destroyed her grave marker.

== Legend of the rebel heroine ==
The most frequently cited source for the story of the rebel heroine is Wesley Guard Lyttle’s Betsy Gray or Hearts of Down: a Tale of Ninety-Eight which appeared in 1888 and was last reprinted in 2008. It includes the "Ballad of Betsy Gray" commemorating "the pride of Down" who, following her appearance amidst the "gory fray" at Ballynahinch, is cut down (with "freedom's dreams") alongside "her sweetheart, Willie Boal" and her brother by government "Yeos" (Yeomanry). Lyttle claims that the "ballad was still familiar in thousands of homes", but he gives no information on the ballad itself in terms of the composer or from what source he received it.

Lyttle was a local newspaper editor (the North Down Herald) but also a writer: his Hearts of Down in which Betsy, "possessed of wondrous beauty ... enriched and enhanced by a warm heart, an ardent temperament", rides into battle in a green silk dress and brandishing a sword, is his "third novel". But in his preface, Lyttle claimed that he obtained his facts from reliable sources ("relations of the sufferers in the '98 rebellion were interviewed and places written of were all visited"). It is also the case that the bones of his "classic" tale were already in print. M'Comb's Guide to Belfast... and Adjoining Districts published in 1861 draws on McSimin's sketches of the rebellion (1849) and on a New and Popular History of Ireland (1857) to render a broadly comparable account.

According to Lyttle, Betsy, the daughter of Hans Gray, a Presbyterian farmer, goes into battle "with a brother and lover, determined to share their fate, mounted on a pony, and bearing a green flag". After the rebel rout, the three are overtaken by a detachment of the Hillsborough Yeomanry Infantry. The two men are killed pleading for her liberty, and Betsy, after having her gloved hand severed by a sword, is shot through the head. The wife of one of the Yeoman, James Little, is afterwards seen wearing the girl's earrings and green petticoat. In a divided community, parishioners in their Annahilt Church would refuse to sit with the Littles in the same pew. While loyalists made "Bessie" the subject of "rude ballads", in "many a cottage" there was to be seen hanging "a rough map representing the battle scene with our heroine mounted on a pony and bearing a green flag".

Similar heroines, with comparable tales, appear in other theatres of the 1798 rebellion: Suzy Toole in Wicklow, Mary Doyle at the Battle of New Ross, and Molly Weston (upon a white horse and dressed in green) at the Battle of Tara Hill.

== Contemporary sources ==
In addition to MacSkimin, M'Comb's cites at least two other references to Betsy Gray by those who were her contemporaries. There is a recollection of "fair Elizabeth Gray" by Charles Teeling, a leader of the Catholic Defenders. M'Comb's also reproduces a poem commemorating the loss of the "poor maiden" on "Erin's ruined plain" by a Miss Balfour published just twelve years after the battle in 1810.

Richard Robert Madden, another early historian of the United Irishmen, had a description from Mary Ann McCracken of the County Down heroine at Ballynahinch riding a white pony and "carrying a stand of colours". McCracken, in turn, had a report from her brother, Henry Joy McCracken, on the run having commanded rebel forces at the Battle of Antrim, of receiving "a half guinea and trifles" from "G. Gray". This, it has been suggested, may have been Betsy's brother George.

Without identifying Betsy, other contemporary sources, closer to the action, lend plausibility to her story. After the Battle of Ballynahinch the Freeman's Journal reported that two women (described by the then loyalist paper as prostitutes) had been killed after bearing the rebel standards in the field. Writing in 1825 James Thomson (the father of Lord Kelvin), recalls as a twelve-year-old accompanying women folk of his own family with provisions to the insurgents and hearing reports that two or three women "remained on the field during the battle, submitting to their share of its labours and dangers and performing as valiant deeds as the men".

There are also the recollections of Hugh McCall appearing in the Lisburn Standard in 1895. As a boy McCall was told by the mother of the rebel commander "Harry Munroe" (Henry Munro) that her daughter "Peg," a girl about the same age as Bessie, had ridden onto the field of battle. Peg Munro was mounted a grey pony and wore a grey sash.

A booklet, "Out in '98", published in the 1920s, reproduced a miniature of Betsy Gray attributed (possibly apocryphally) to "Newell of Downpatrick". The portrait artist Edward John Newell, according his own Life and Confessions of Newell, the Informer, was a United Irishman who betrayed over two hundred members and sympathisers to the government. No direct connection, however, appears to be drawn between Gray's fate and the artist's treachery.

== Accounts of birthplace and home ==
At least three locations in County Down have been proposed as Gray's birthplace and home. In Lyttle's partially fictionalised account, Gray is born and raised on a farm in the townland of Gransha, near Bangor and Newtownards. Her family is said to have rented land here, and this remains the most well-known association. However, in an appendix to a 1968 reprint of Lyttle’s Hearts of Down, historian Aiken McClelland of the Ulster Folk Museum sets out evidence for the Townland of Tullyniskey (now spelt Tullinisky) near the villages of Waringsford and Dromara as her birthplace. He cites the research of local historian Colin Johnston Robb who himself cites contemporary and secondary sources to support a local tradition of the Dromara area that Betsy was born there.

According to this evidence and the local tradition of the area, Betsy was the daughter of a John and Rebecca Gray (née Young) of Tullyniskey with records for nearby Garvaghy Parish Church showing her baptised on 14 January 1780. In support of Robb, McClelland also highlights that Charles Teeling in his description of Betsy Grey describes her as "the pride of a widowed mother” supporting the records of John Gray’s death in 1795 with Rebecca Gray living until 1813.

Mary Ann McCracken's account suggests Gray may have been from the townland of Six Roads Ends near Killinchy, where there was a derelict site known locally as "Betsy Gray's cottage".

== Contested memory ==
"Elizabeth Gray, George Gray, William Boal, 13th June 1798". "Erected by James Gray, grandnephew of Elizabeth and George Gray, 1896".

Gray was reputedly buried with her companions near to where they were killed at Ballycreen (townland of Magheradrool) near Ballynahinch. A tradition developed that each year locals would visit the grave and lay flowers. The site of the grave was a field, owned then and for a century later by a family called Armstrong, that had been “preserved and not put under cultivation”.

In 1896, following a proposal to the Henry J McCracken Literary Society in Belfast, a formal memorial stone was installed on the site. It was paid for from London by James Gray, "grandnephew of Elizabeth and George Gray". Mr Samuel Armstrong was thanked "for his goodness and that of his family in guarding the grave so well for 98 years, and for his kindness in permitting decorations”. He replied that “any man, no matter what his politics might be, who could not honour such heroism and unsullied patriotism as that displayed by the victims who fell and were buried on his farm would be dead to all sense of humanity and nobility”.

The new landmark attracted wider attention to the site but at a time when, in the approach to the 1798 centenary, the "unsullied patriotism" of the United Irishmen was increasingly contentious. After the 1800 Acts of Union Ulster Presbyterians had transferred their loyalty from a parliament in Dublin they had hoped to reform to a reforming "imperial parliament" at Westminster. Following Gladstone's first Home Rule Bill in 1886, as unionists they resisted the efforts of largely Catholic-supported nationalists to invoke the memory of "'98" in support of their campaign to restore Ireland's legislative independence.

James Mills of Ballynahinch, born in 1882, was present when a number of local men destroyed the memorial: "there was to have been a special ceremony at the grave on that Sunday to mark the centenary of the '98 Rising, and local Protestants were inflamed because it was being organised by Roman Catholics and other Home Rulers". When the parties, mainly from Belfast, began to arrive in horse-drawn carriages for the centenary ceremony scuffles took place, the reins of the horses were cut by the locals, and the visitors put to flight. William Redmond, leader of the Irish Parliamentary Party asked questions in the House of Commons about the incident, which was widely reported in newspapers across Ireland.

The centenary celebrated on the streets of Ballynahinch on 13 June was the victory of the Crown. The following month, at a "monster" Orange demonstration on Edenavady Hill (where the rebels had taken their stand) the Rev. L. A. Poole queried why Catholics should wish to celebrate '98. "They had little or nothing to do with it. The night before the Battle of Ballynahinch, the Roman Catholics deserted ... They decorated the grave of Betsy Gray but they had not the courage to fight beside her".

The story of Catholic desertion was common, although a more sympathetic account has Catholic Defenders decamping only after their proposal for a night attack on the soldiery rioting in the town was rejected by Munro as taking an "ungenerous advantage". James Hope (who had been a United emissary to the Defenders) assured the historian R. R. Madden that "the Killinchy people were the men who deserted and they did so in a body and they were Dissenters" (Presbyterians). If, as Mary-Ann McCracken believed, Killinchy was her home town, they would also have been Betsy Gray's neighbours.

== Later references ==
Betsy features, alongside major figures in the United Irish movement in Ulster, as a character in a 2016 historic novel by Conor O'Clery, The Star Man.

The Betsy Gray Cup is awarded by the Down County Board of the Gaelic Athletic Association.
