= Wesley Guard Lyttle =

Irish newspaper publisher and editor (1844–1886)

Wesley Guard Lyttle (real name Wesley Greenhill Lyttle, pseudonym Robin, 15 April 1844 - 30 October 1896) was an Irish newspaper publisher, writer and editor.

== Life ==
He was born in Newtownards, County Down. He worked as a junior reporter, schoolteacher, and editor, among other occupations. He was well known as an entertainer, often in the guise of his alter-ego "Robin", a jovial country farmer who regaled his audiences in Ulster-Scots dialect. For most of the 1870s Lyttle lived in Belfast where he began to write and perform his humorous monologues. From 1880 he owned and edited the North Down Herald. Lyttle moved the newspaper to Bangor in 1883 where it became the North Down Herald and Bangor Gazette, a strong Liberal and Home Rule paper. He published his humorous monologues as Robin’s Readings and continued to give public performances.

Lyttle is probably best remembered today for his novel Betsy Gray, or, The Hearts of Down. It first appeared in serial form in the Herald, beginning on 7 November 1885. It is a semi-historical account of Betsy Gray, a Presbyterian peasant girl who became a leader of the pikemen in the front ranks at the Battle of Ballynahinch, during the Irish rebellion of 1798. Lyttle provides a vivid, if not entirely historically accurate, account of the Rebellion in County Down, and the events immediately leading up to the insurrection.

His name is usually given as Wesley Guard Lyttle, due to an error in his obituary in the Belfast News-Letter, 2 November 1896.

== Select works ==
- Robin's Readings, Eight Vols.
- Sons of the Sod: A Tale of County Down, 1886.
- Betsy Gray, 1888
- The Smugglers of Strangford Lough.
- Daft Eddie, 1889.
- Two Irish Arthurian Romances, published 1908.
