= Thomas Ledlie Birch =

Irish minister

Reverend Thomas Ledlie Birch
- Born: 1754; Gilford, County Down, Kingdom of Ireland
- Died: 1828 (aged 73–74); Freeport, Pennsylvania
- Occupation: Presbyterian Church Minister
- Notable work: A Letter from an Irish Emigrant (1799)
- Movement: Society of United Irishmen
- Criminal charges: Treason 1797, 1798

Thomas Ledlie Birch (1754–1828) was a Presbyterian minister and radical democrat in the Kingdom of Ireland. Forced into American exile following the suppression of the 1798 rebellion, he wrote A Letter from An Irish Emigrant (1799).

Assailing the landed Anglican Ascendancy and vindicating the call for an Irish republic, it was the first published apologia for the United Irish insurrection. In the United States, he found himself at odds with the spirit of evangelical revivalism.

== Early life ==
Birch was the sixth and youngest son of a County Down farmer and merchant. He studied at the University of Glasgow and was ordained as a Presbyterian minister in Saintfield in 1776, with 900 families one of the largest Presbyterian congregations in Ireland. He married Isabella Ledlie, a second cousin from Arboe, County Tyrone in 1783.

His exposure in Glasgow to the ideas of the Scottish Enlightenment heightened the sympathy he shared with his congregants for their American kin in the struggle for independence from Britain. In 1784, through a brother-in-law in Philadelphia, Birch presented George Washington with an address he had written for the (Masonic) Yankee Club of Stewartstown, Tyrone. It expressed their joy that the Americans had succeeded in throwing off “the yoke of slavery” and suggested that their exertions had "shed a benign light on the distressed kingdom of Ireland". Washington returned his thanks.

== Volunteer and United Irishman ==
When in the American War the Irish Volunteers were mustered to defend against a French invasion, Birch recognised an opportunity to broaden the political franchise against both the Ascendancy, that monopolised representation in the Irish Parliament, and the Dublin Castle executive appointed by the King's ministers in London. He became chaplain to the volunteer Saintfield Light Infantry, and called his manse "Liberty Hall".

With other prominent Volunteers, in the 1783 and 1790 general elections Birch campaigned in Down for the candidates of the Stewarts, Presbyterians and relative upstarts among county gentry; first for Lord Londonderry and then, with success, for his son Robert Stewart. Birch, however, was soon disillusioned. While the new MP reacted to revolutionary events in France, and to the prospect of war with the new republic, by rallying to the government, Birch was persuaded that reform would have to be sought in an extra-parliamentary union with the Catholic majority.

In 1792 Birch joined the United Irishmen, intervening with them in a crucial Bastille Day Volunteer debate in Belfast to defend a resolution in favour of immediate, unqualified, Catholic emancipation. He decried the "withholding of rights from our Catholic brethren" as "criminally unjust and impolitic", and declared he would rather transport himself to Botany Bay, "than live in a country which continued to keep itself in abject slavery, by its internal divisions".

=== Birch's Saintfield Resolutions ===
Birch convened the Saintfield Society of United Irishmen and on Christmas Eve 1792 moved their first resolutions.

Resolved, that we will steadily pursue every reasonable, legal and constitutional means in our power, to obtain a more equal representation of the people in Parliament and a shorter period of parliamentary delegation

Resolved that a radical reform can never be affected, but by extending the right of suffrage to all sects and denominations of Irishmen.

Resolved, that we look upon our brethren Roman Catholics as men deprived of their just rights--that we highly approve of their present mode of proceeding and sincerely and heartily wish them success.

An almost identical resolution was carried by Birch's church congregation, but with the anticipation that they would be opposed by the landowner-led yeomanry and loyalist vigilantes. The Belfast News Letter (4 January 1793) reported that the congregation unanimously applauded a proposal that "for the defence of their families and properties" a further 500 of their number "be added to the National Guards [the Volunteers] of Ireland".

Birch's visions from the pulpit were often millenarian: he spoke of the approaching "overthrow of the Beast", the "Battle of Armaggedon" that would be the "prelude to a peaceful reign of 1,000 years." At the same time Birch asked his congregants to consider that "we live in a very advanced and enlightened period of the world, when ignorance and superstition are falling like lightening from heaven" and that, as a minister, he had a duty to bear witness against the corruptions of government.

Birch told Wolfe Tone that his congregation were completely converted to his views; and that they had celebrated French victories over the Austrian and Prussian armies. Now, however, that the government was rendering both the Volunteer and United Irish movements illegal, they were "dissatisfied" with his comparative moderation.

The conversion to Birch's political gospel, however, was not complete. Some of his congregation withdrew, joining the "Seceders" or Reformed Presbyterians. While refusing to bow their knee "to any king but Jesus" they were, at least in north Down, hostile to his overt republicanism.

== Rebellion and exile ==
In 1797, eleven of Birch's congregation were charged with attacking the house of the McKee family, local loyalists who supplied the authorities with such information as they could gather on the activities of United Irishmen. They were all acquitted thanks chiefly to the withering cross-examination of prosecution witness the Presbyterian-turned-Anglican Rev. John Cleland, sub-sheriff and land agent of the Lord Londonderry, by the celebrity defence-counsel for the democratic cause, John Philpot Curran. Birch added drama to the proceedings by being arrested in the court on a charge of High Treason. Finding the conduct of the prosecutor "base and malicious", the presiding judge at his subsequent trial in Downpatrick directed his honourable discharge.

Birch, as chaplain of the United [Irish] Army in County Down, took to the field with his men on 8 June 1798. They converged a thousand strong on the McKee homestead. All eight members of the family died in a siege that saw the house set alight. A relief column of 300, consisting of Newtownards Yeomanry Cavalry (in which Birch's elder brother George was an officer) and 270 York Fencibles was ambushed by the rebels (among them Birch's elder son John was killed in the skirmish) and obliged to retreat, withdrawing through Comber to Belfast.

According to witnesses at his subsequent court-martial, the day after the Battle of Saintfield, "Pike Sunday", Birch appeared among the rebel army assembled at Creevy Rocks, a hill outside the town. None testified to his preaching a sermon, but there is at least one record (possibly spurious) of his offering the following:

Men of Down, we are gathered here today ... to pray and fight for the liberty of this Kingdom of Ireland. We have grasped the pike and musket to fight for the right against might, to drive the bloodhounds of King George the German king beyond the seas. This is Ireland, we are Irish and shall be free.

On Monday, Birch marched with the army to Ballynahinch, but returned the same day to Saintfield to help marshal reinforcements. After the rout of the rebels at Ballynahinch on Wednesday 13 June, Birch retired to his manse, where on the 16th he was arrested.

He faced a court-martial in Lisburn where one observer contrasted his "long and blubbering defence" with the dignity with which Munro, preceding him, had made on the army officers present (Munro's last words on the scaffold were: "Tell my country I had deserved better of her"). Thanks to the intercession of his brother George who, in addition to being a Yeomanry officer, was the physician to the Londonderrys, Birch and his 17-year old son George, who had also appeared among the rebels, were assured that they could avoid the worst by agreeing to remove themselves from country.

After some weeks on a prison ship in Belfast Lough where he encountered fellow Presbyterian clergy William Steel Dickson, William Sinclair and David Bailie Warden (the Presbyterian licentiate who had led an attack upon the garrison in Newtownards), in August 1798 Birch sailed with other marked men for New York City on the ship Harmony of New Bedford. (Birch's counterpart in the west of Ulster, John Glendy, minister of Maghera, was permitted the same consideration: permitted, later in the year, to sail for Norfolk, Virginia).

George later departed for the East Indies. He became a lieutenant in the Bengal Infantry, dying unmarried in 1808.

== A Letter from An Irish Emigrant ==
Birch may have started writing his Letter on the trans-Atlantic crossing. It was end dated 26 October 1798, and published the following month in Philadelphia. The politics of the Irish immigrant communities in Philadelphia and in New York City were democratic and opposed to the Federalist commitment to an understanding with Britain. The Letter was addressed to an American audience and sought to counter Federalist propaganda in which the rebellion in Ireland was discredited as part of a larger effort to generate and sustain alarm over revolutionary developments in France.

Birch decried the "unnatural war" that, under the British Crown, Irish Presbyterians had been forced to wage against their "brethren" in America. Their only wish was to be "indulged (like you) as citizens, in enjoying rights without religious distinctions, and fair vote of chusing [sic] their Representatives in the Commons House of [the Irish] Parliament". But their "humble petitions" were ignored, and visited with "rapines, burnings, rapes, murders, and other sheddings of blood", the people were "goaded" into insurrection. "Nothing", they were persuaded, "will satisfy (no matter at what price) but a republican form of government".

Birch did not restrain himself from proposing that in this resolve, the people of Ireland "are inspired (as they think) with a well-grounded belief, and hope that the time is arrived, when the [Biblical] Prophecies concerning the Universal Dominion of Christ's Kingdom, and the peaceful happy state upon earth ... are to be fulfilled".

== Last years: at odds with American revivalism ==
In the United States, Birch returned to the ministry, first in Philadelphia and then, unhappily due to various disputes, political and religious, with the Ohio Presbytery in Allegheny County, western Pennsylvania.

The Ohio presbytery disapproved of Birch's radical republicanism, which he had translated into support for Thomas Jefferson and his Democratic-Republican Party. Together with most of the local shopkeepers, merchants and landowners, the elders and clergy supported the Federalist Party. Citing his United Irish past, Rev. John McMillan characterised Birch as a "fugitive from justice and an enemy of order". But "more fundamentally" the presbytery responded to Birch's hostility to a new American-frontier theology. Despite his own millenarianism (based on his reading of the Books of Daniel and Revelation he concluded that the Second Coming of Christ would occur in Washington in 1848), as in Ireland Birch robustly defended the Presbyterian orthodoxy. He was repelled by a revivalism that emphasised personal faith experience. The Ohio Presbytery repeatedly rejected Birch as "unconverted".

In American revivalism, Birch may have recognized something of that which in Ireland he had observed in the "Seceders" who believed they were returning to the fundamentals of the faith. In a broadside published in 1796 he had denounced the excesses of their outdoor communion observations, suggesting that their primary aim was "large collections", and had rebuked their reactionary politics.

In 1804 Birch purchased a farm five miles west of Washington, Pennsylvania, where a local paper records him officiating at a wedding in June 1819. He died near Freeport, Pennsylvania in 1828. His widow Isabella died in Cadiz, Ohio in 1836, and a last surviving son, Hamilton, died there in 1847. His
