= Battle of Saintfield =

Battle during the Irish Rebellion of 1798

- Part of the Irish Rebellion
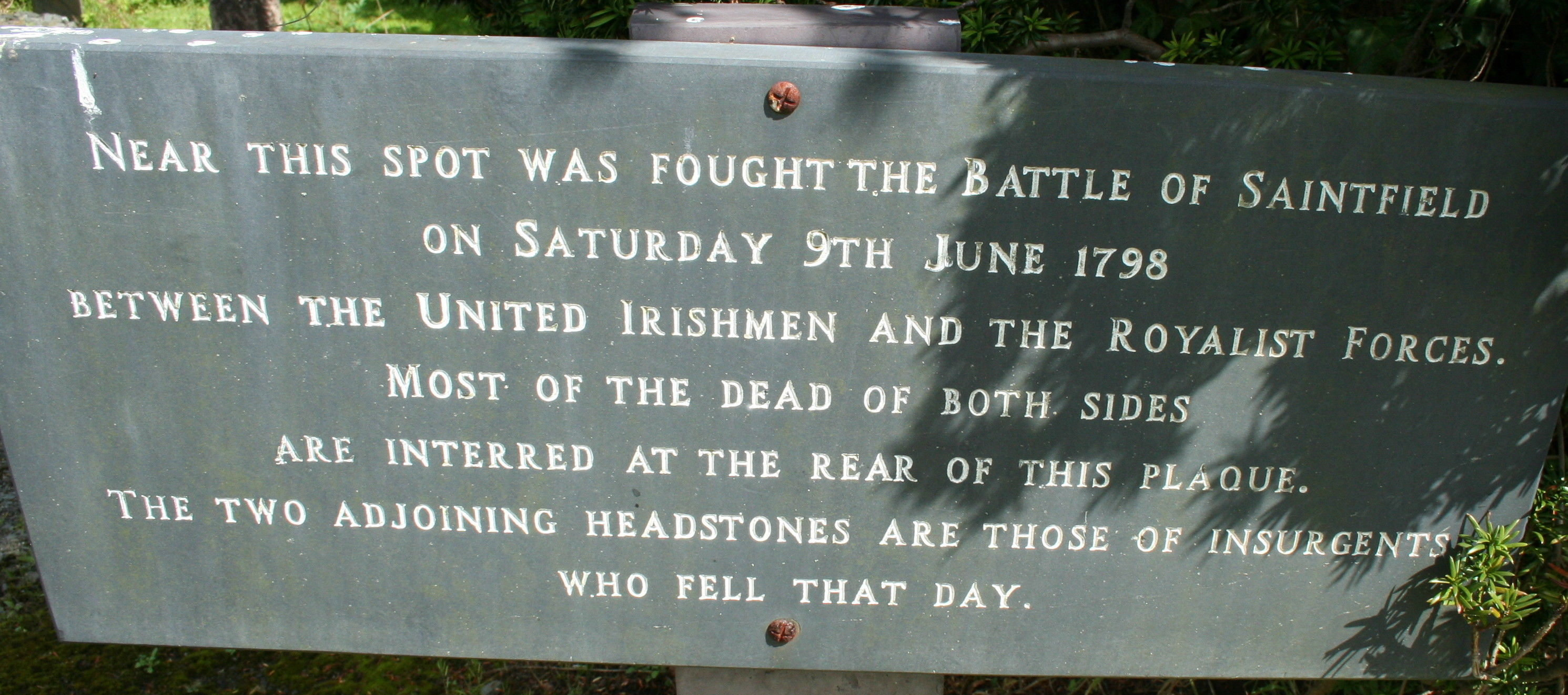
- Plaque commemorating the battle.
Date	9 June 1798
Location	Saintfield, County Down
Result	Irish victory

Belligerents
United Irishmen	(Kingdom of Great Britain) British Army: (Kingdom of Ireland) Loyalists

Commanders and leaders
Richard Frazer; McKinstry (KIA)	Colonel Hon. Granville Anson Chetwynd-Stapylton

Strength
1,000 at least	350, two six-pounder guns

Casualties and losses
30–40 killed	58 killed ~10 captured

The Battle of Saintfield was a short but bloody clash in County Down, Northern Ireland. The battle was the first major conflict of the Irish Rebellion of 1798 in Down. The battle took place on Saturday, 9 June 1798.

== Background ==
A rebel force, over a thousand strong, converged on a large house owned by the McKee family. The McKees were a family of loyalists, who were unpopular in the region: one year before, they had provided information to the authorities leading to the arrest of the radical Presbyterian minister and United Irishman Thomas Ledlie Birch and some members of his congregation.

The McKees knew that they were unpopular and were thus armed to the teeth. As the house was surrounded, shots were fired from the fortified house, hitting some of the attackers. Gunfire held the insurgents back for a short while, until one of them, a fiddler by the name of Orr, managed to sneak around the back of the house with a ladder, and thence set the roof alight. The house was destroyed, and all eight members of the family inside killed. News of this quickly reached the British forces in the area, and a 300 strong force under Colonel Granville Staplyton, consisting of Newtownards Yeomanry cavalry and 270 York Fencibles, as well as two light cannon, marched to the region.

== The battle ==
The rebels, however, had anticipated the move and were waiting in ambush. Stapylton saw the road ahead twisting into woods, and ordered a pair of scouts to check for anything suspicious. The men do not seem to have been particularly vigilant, as when they returned they declared that the road ahead was safe.

The redcoats marched into the wooded area, a dense hedge snaking along the road on one side: on the opposite side, the ground steadily rose, with the areas higher up the slope dominated by demesne woods. This provided cover for the Irish. The Irish rebels were mostly armed with pikes and the terrain allowed them to quickly swarm the soldiers on the road below. In the fierce hand-to-hand combat that followed the British forces were overwhelmed. One of the fencibles, a veteran of wars in Europe who managed to survive the attack, later stated that he had never before witnessed such fierce fighting: Every man had to fight his way in the best manner he could in opposition to the charged pike and other weapons, to which he had not been accustomed.

Over fifty men were piked to death before Stapylton managed to order the soldiers; he then brought his cannon into play against the mass of rebels before him, inflicting enough casualties with canister and grapeshot to blunt their attack. In the meantime, Stapylton's force used the situation to march to safety. The following day the York Fencible Regiment of Foot, Stapylton had left to garrison Newtownards repulsed a rebel attack led by David Bailie Warden but then withdrew through Comber to re-join their commander in Belfast.

== Aftermath ==
The battle of Saintfield was largely regarded as a victory of the United Irish rebels. Long after, in the 1950s, two skeletons and a sword and bayonet of the York fencibles were found in the area.

However, the rebellion in Down would prove short lived. The day after the battle, "Pike Sunday", Birch preached to the whole rebel army assembled at Creevy Rocks, a hill outside the town:

Men of Down, we are gathered here today ... to pray and fight for the liberty of this Kingdom of Ireland. We have grasped the pike and musket to fight for the right against might, to drive the bloodhounds of King George the German king beyond the seas. This is Ireland, we are Irish and shall be free.

The assembled north Down army marched south joining the larger rebel command led by Henry Munro. This was routed on 12 June at the Battle of Ballynahinch.

Many of the dead from both sides of the battle of Saintfield were placed in a mass grave within the grounds of the nearby Presbyterian church. Although there is a plaque signifying the location of these graves, the area seems largely neglected with what appears to be temporary vehicle access over the belligerents final resting place. In May 2010 a memorial park was finished and opened. The area has been cleared and landscaped, with several new plaques and information boards being erected. The graves have been refurbished and the headstones relaid.

1798 United Irishmen graves

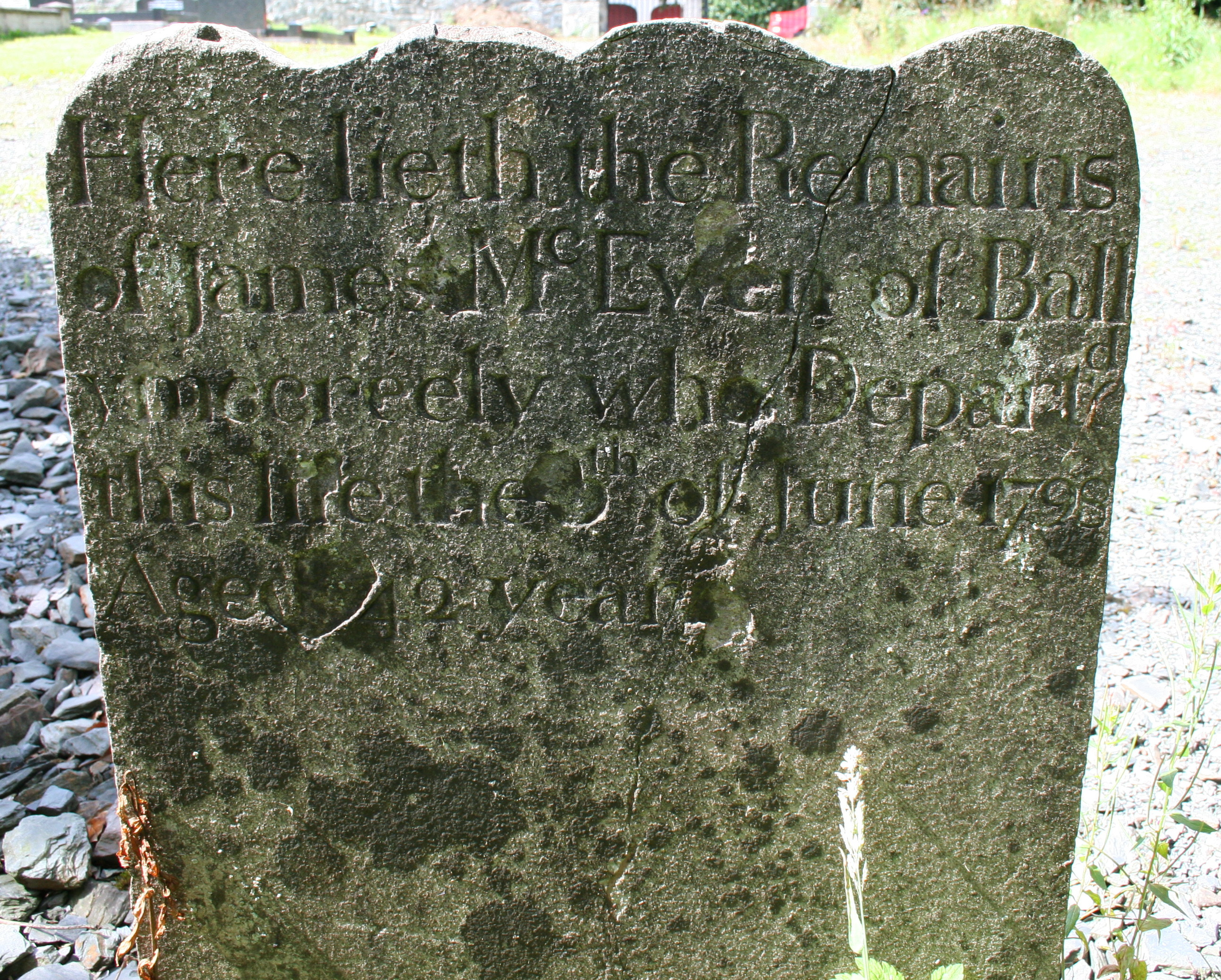
Gravestone of James McEwen of Ballymaccreely

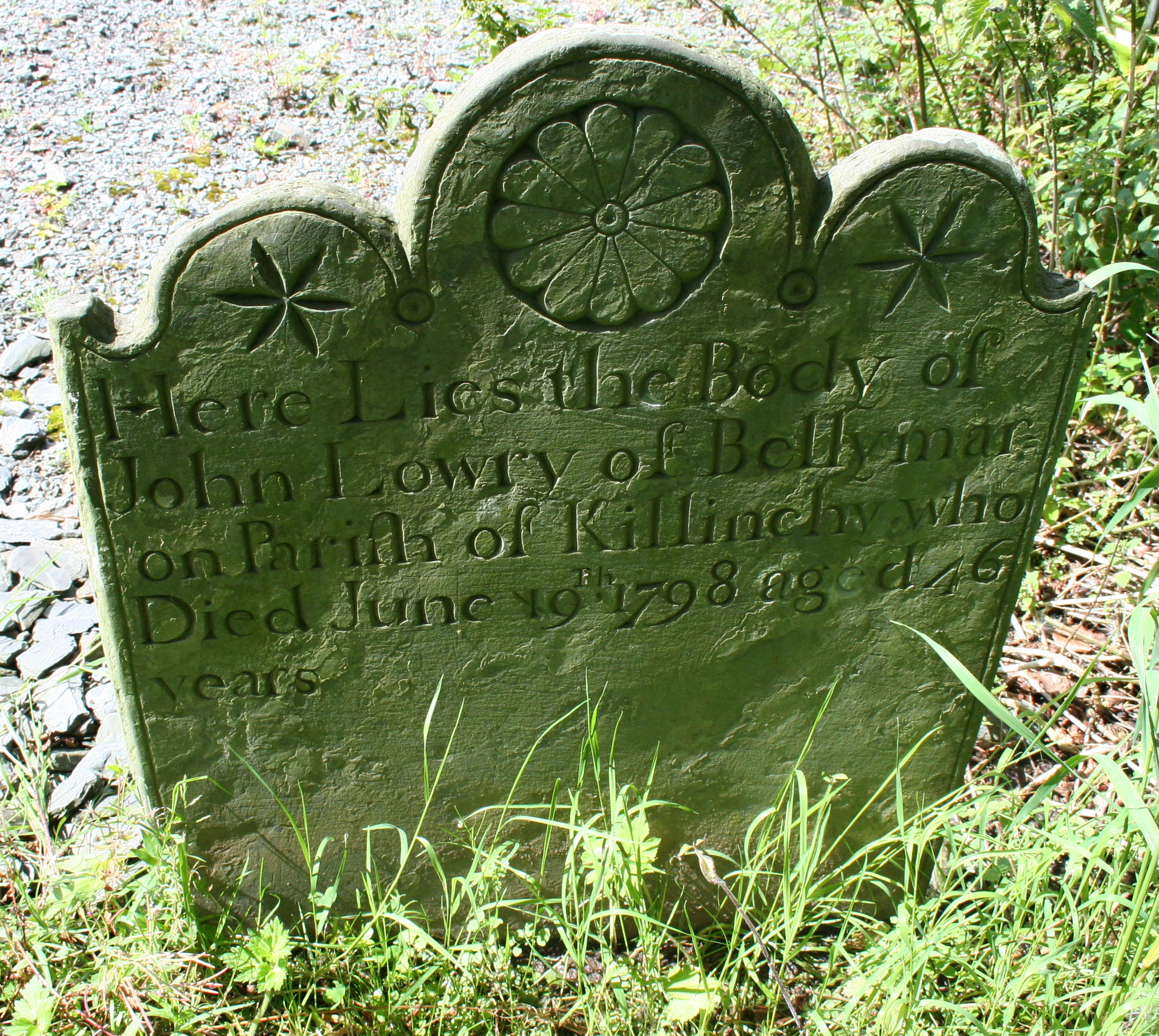
Gravestone of John Lowry of Killinchy
