= Robin's Readings =

Robin's Readings is a six-part radio series adapted from 'Robin's Readings' - a collection of humorous stories written in the 19th century by County Down author, Wesley Greenhill Lyttle. The stories recount the adventures and mishaps of Paddy McQuillan, a cheerful but unfortunate County Down farmer - and they are written in the authentic Ulster-Scots language which was spoken throughout the Ards Peninsula.

Robin's Readings were dramatised for Radio Ulster in Summer 2010. The majority of the parts were filled by native Ulster-Scots speakers with the two main roles of Paddy McQuillan and Robin Gordon being filled by Will McAvoy and Paddy McAvoy respectively.

Music for the series was provided by County Down gospel hillbilly group - the Low Country Boys.
