= A7 road (Northern Ireland) =

Road in Northern Ireland

Coordinates: 54.40815°N 5.77295°W

A7

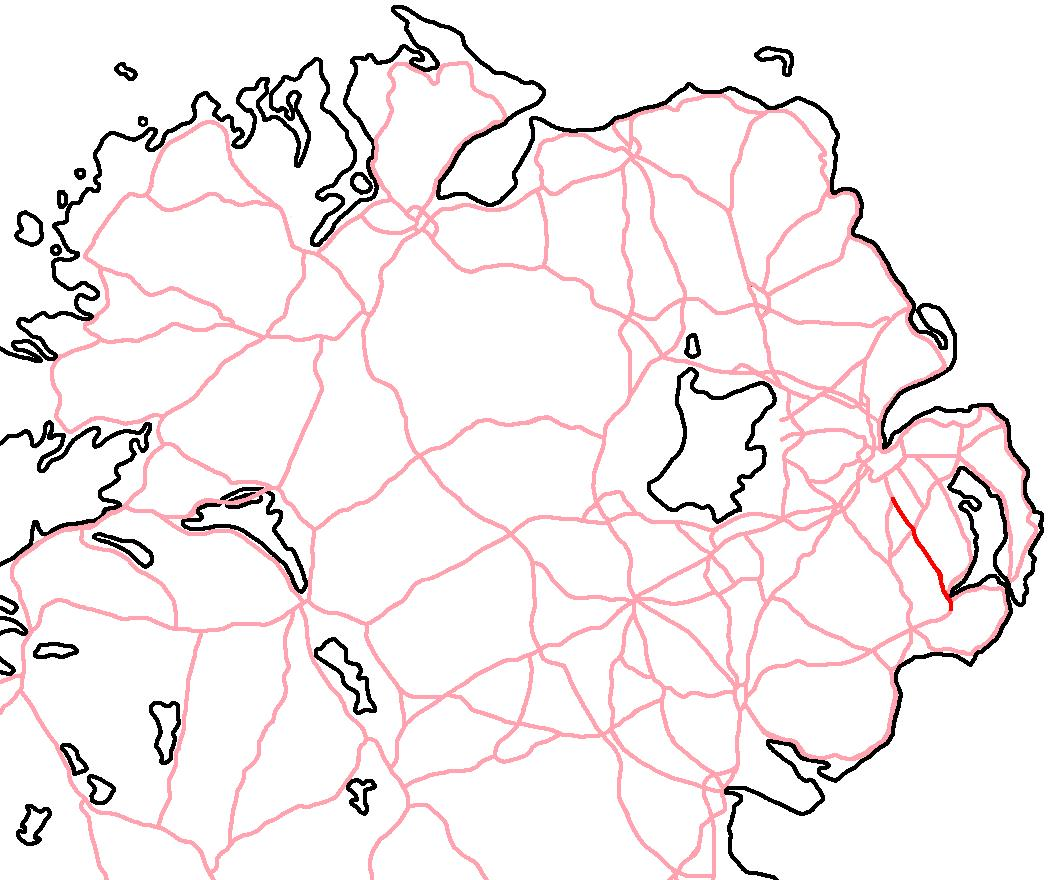
- The route of the A7 in red from Carryduff (County Down) to Downpatrick (County Down)

Route information
- Length: 15.0 mi (24.1 km)

Major junctions
- North end: Carryduff
- South end: Downpatrick

Location
- Country: United Kingdom
- Constituent country: Northern Ireland
- Primary destinations: Saintfield; Crossgar

Road network
- Roads in Northern Ireland; Motorways; A roads in Northern Ireland
← A24

In Northern Ireland, the A7 is a major trunk road running 15.0 miles (24.1 km) from Downpatrick, through Crossgar and Saintfield, to Carryduff.
Here the A7 joins the A24 (running from Newcastle) at an at-grade roundabout, and continues to Belfast.

The section between Carryduff and Saintfield was constructed in the latter half of the 19th century, to bypass Ouley Hill, as the previous route along Old Saintfield Road/Killynure Road was proving too arduous for stagecoach horses.

== Composition ==
The road is standard single-carriageway throughout most of its length, with two short sections of climbing lanes (approx 500m each). The first of these runs northbound, starting about two miles north of Downpatrick at the former site of the Abbey Lodge Hotel. The second runs southbound and begins about a mile south of Saintfield near Doran's Rock.

== Junctions ==
Apart from its terminus junction with the A24, the A7 road crosses these A and B roads:

- B2 (2 miles north of Downpatrick)
- B7 (Crossgar)
- B6 (Saintfield)
- A21 (Saintfield)
