= Carryduff =

Town in County Down, Northern Ireland

Coordinates: 54.509°N 5.872°W

Carryduff: Irish: Ceathrú Aodha Dhuibh
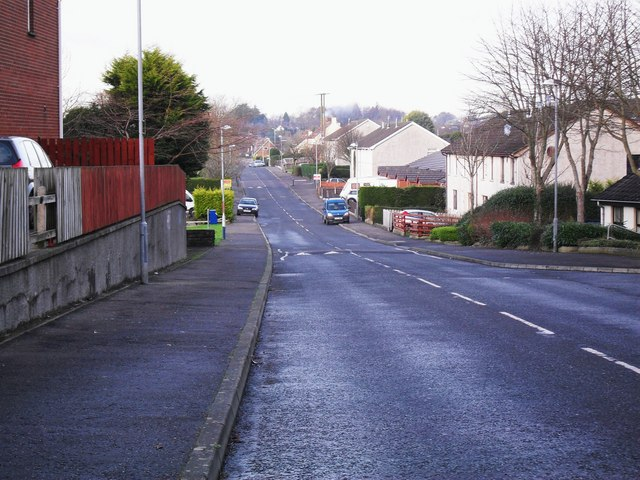
- Killynure Road passes through Carryduff

- Location within County Down
- Population: 7,173 (2021 census)
- Irish grid reference: J3683065382
- District: Lisburn and Castlereagh
- County: County Down
- Country: Northern Ireland
- Sovereign state: United Kingdom
- Post town: BELFAST
- Postcode district: BT8
- Dialling code: 028
- Police: Northern Ireland
- Fire: Northern Ireland
- Ambulance: Northern Ireland
- UK Parliament: Belfast South
- NI Assembly: South Belfast

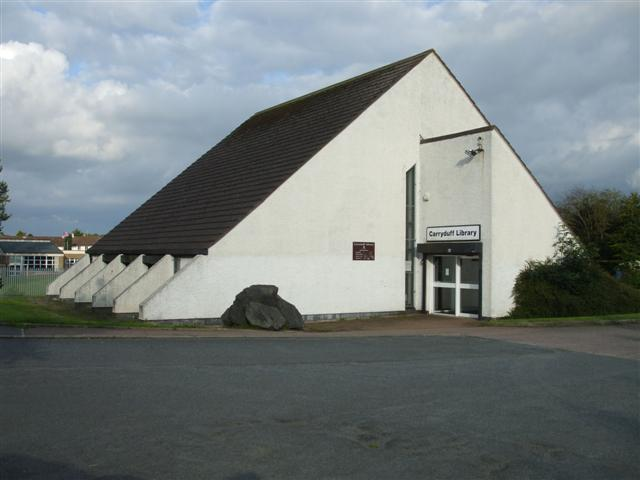
Carryduff Library

Carryduff (from Irish Ceathrú Aodha Dhuibh, meaning 'Black Hugh's quarter') is a small town and townland in County Down, Northern Ireland, about 10 kilometres (6.2 mi) south of Belfast city centre. It had a population of 7,173 people in the 2021 census. Most of the settlement lies within the townland of Carryduff, although part of it extends into the neighbouring townlands of Killynure and Mealough.

== History ==
One of the earliest references to the settlement dates from 1622, where its anglicised name is written as Carrow-Hugh-Duffe. The original village formed where six roads and a river crossed, and is the site of the ancient Queen's Fort Rath. The road south from Belfast (the A24) climbs out of a gap in the Castlereagh Hills, and splits at Carryduff, one fork (the A7) continuing to Downpatrick (via Saintfield and Crossgar), the other fork (A24) continuing via Ballynahinch to Newcastle towards Kilkeel. In addition, the road from the Ards Peninsula, Newtownards and Comber (the B178) crosses here en route to Hillsborough in the west. All six roads cross the small Carryduff River here (which flows northwards to eventually join the River Lagan at Minnowburn).

The Knockbracken Reservoir was constructed for the Belfast Water Commissioners and opened in 1901, the same year as the Mourne Conduit which carried water from the Kilkeel and Annalong rivers (and later the Silent Valley Reservoir) to Carryduff where it was transported on to Belfast. The Mourne Conduit was replaced by the Aquarius pipeline and associated infrastructure between 1999 and 2004. This new pipeline was laid to the east and north of Carryduff, crossing the A24 at Brackenvale, and bypassing the Knockbracken Reservoir.

The road connections with and proximity to Belfast meant that the town saw some overspill development, from the city, in the 1960s. This period saw several housing developments, the construction of the "Town and Country Shopping Centre", and Carryduff Primary School, leading into the 1970s with the building of the Killynure housing estate by the Northern Ireland Housing Executive. Development along one side of the northbound A24 took place adjacent to the Immaculate Heart of Mary Roman Catholic Church and St Joseph's Primary School, with the Knockbracken Reservoir on the other side.

The 1980s saw expansion continue with Carryduff becoming a commuter town for Belfast workers. Developments continued into the 1990s and included Carryduff Library, Carryduff Shopping Centre. These developments saw the Carryduff River placed inside a culvert for much of its journey through the town. Very little green belt land now remains between Carryduff and the southern border of Belfast, the 1980s having seen the former Matthew Stop Line breached.

In 2018, the disused Knockbracken reservoir became Ireland's largest aqua park, offering a range of water based activities.

== Demography ==
=== 2021 census ===
The population of Carryduff on census day (21 March 2021) was 7,173 people. Of these:

- 53.36% were from a Catholic background and 36.46% were from a Protestant or Other Christian (including Christian related) background, 1.4% were from other religious backgrounds and 8.77% had no religious background
- 37.22% indicated they had a British national identity, 39.89% indicated they had an Irish national identity, and 35.69% indicated they had a Northern Irish national identity*

*respondents could indicate more than one nationality.

=== 2011 census ===
The population of Carryduff on census day (27 March 2011) was 6,961 people. Of these:

- 21.45% were aged under 16 years and 13.92% were aged 65 years and over
- The mean age was 38 years
- 47.55% of the population were male and 52.45% were female
- 96.83% were from the white (including Irish Traveller) ethnic group
- 49.85% were from a Catholic background and 42.24% were from a Protestant or Other Christian (including Christian related) background
- 49.39% indicated they had a British national identity, 28.96% indicated they had an Irish national identity, and 32.45% indicated they had a Northern Irish national identity*

*respondents could indicate more than one nationality.

== Sport ==
=== Gaelic games ===
The local Gaelic Athletic Association (GAA) club is Carryduff GAC. It was initially formed in 1971, when a group of parents, concerned at the lack of playing facilities in the area, formed a schoolboys Gaelic football team. Within a couple of years, a full GAA club had come into being with a team entered in the East Down League. Carryduff has had a number county players over the years with Greg Blaney, Neil Collins, Mark McCartan and John Kelly featuring in the All-Ireland winning Down county football teams of the 1990s.

=== Running ===
Carryduff Running Club, which was founded in 2022, is affiliated with Athletics NI. The club also runs a free non-member based "Couch to 5k" program as well as weekly organised runs.

=== Association football ===
Carryduff also has 2 local men's football teams who all play from Lough Moss pitches in the town, they are Carryduff Colts F.C. and Carryduff Athletic F.C.

== Churches ==
The Catholic parish of Drumbo was erected in late 1943 by Bishop Daniel Mageean in response to an offer of land from Mr Patrick Mallon as the site for a church. After the Belfast Blitz an influx of Belfast families to the area coupled with the arrival of US troops increased the Catholic population.

On 30 June 1946 a new church, under the dedication of the Immaculate Heart of Mary was opened and blessed by Bishop Daniel Mageean. The sermonist was Cardinal Cahal Daly. Nine years later on 9th Jan 1955 St Joseph's Primary School began to educate pupils on a site adjacent to the church.

== Music ==
Carryduff-based musician Johnny 'Goatboy' Reid was a member of Belfast punk rock band The Dangerfields, completing numerous international tours with them on guitar and bass between 2001 and 2003. Reid also substituted on guitar for English punk band Disorder for a European tour in 2002.
