= David Bailie Warden =

American diplomat, author and book collector

David Baillie Warden
- Born: 1772; Ballycastle, County Down, Kingdom of Ireland
- Died: 9 October 1845 (aged 72–73); Paris, Kingdom of France
- Education: Glasgow University
- Occupations: Diplomat, scholar, author
- Movement: Society of United Irishmen
- Honours: Member of the Académie des sciences, Paris. Member of the American Philosophical Society.

David Bailie Warden (1772–1845) was a republican insurgent in the Irish Rebellion of 1798 and, in later exile, a United States consul in Paris. While in American service Warden protested the corruption of diplomatic service by the "avaricious" spirit of commerce and condemned slavery. Warden continued in Paris as an academician, widely recognised for his pioneering and encyclopaedic contributions to the understanding of international law, and of the geography, history and government of the Americas.

== Ireland and the Rebellion of 1798 ==
=== Early life ===
Warden was born in 1772 in the townland of Ballycastle near Newtownards in County Down, Ireland. His father (Robert Warden; m. Elizabeth Bailie) was a tenant of the Marquess of Londonderry, whose son Robert Stewart, the future Lord Castlreagh, fatefully for Warden, was to become Chief Secretary for Ireland.

Warden attended Bangor Academy and Glasgow University. At Glasgow, he was awarded a Master of Arts in 1797 with a prize for natural philosophy and a certificate in midwifery. While he was to retain his interest in medicine, Warden accepted a provisional license to preach from the Presbytery of Bangor, County Down. He was a pupil of Rev. James Porter at nearby Greyabbey, following his lectures on natural and experimental philosophy (keeping notebooks he presented to Porter's son almost four decades later). Like Porter, Warden joined the Society of United Irishmen. Inspired by revolutionary events in France, and despairing of the prospects for reform under the British Crown, the society resolved to secure a national and representative government by insurrection.

=== United Irish Insurgent ===
When the call to arms came in County Down, on 7 June 1798, Warden had been hastily commissioned as a local commander to replace the United Irish veteran William Steel Dickson caught up, with most of the county leadership, in a government dragnet. Following a rebel ambush of government troops at Saintfield on 9 June, on 10 June (later recalled as "Pike Sunday") Warden assembled the first of his forces, 300 men, whom he marched on Newtownards. After repelling the first assault, the garrison of Yorkshire Fencibles withdrew, allowing the rebels to establish in the town a French revolutionary style Committee of Public Safety. The "Republic" lasted but three days. Beginning late on 12 June, Warden as "aide de camp" to Henry Munro, witnessed the rout of the main rebel conjunction at Ballynahinch.

Warden escaped the fate of his mentor, James Porter, hung at Castlereagh's insistence outside his church in Greyabbey in July. Through the intercession of influential friends, Castlereagh allowed him permanent exile. After several weeks on a crowded prison ship, on which William Steel Dickson recalled Warden's "lively, rational and entertaining conversation", he sailed for the United States.

From America, Warden was pseudonymously to write A Narrative of the Principal Proceedings of the Republican Army of the County of Down. The account was sent to Ireland where the authorities made some effort to intercept it.

=== Repudiated by the Bangor Presbytery ===
Before sailing for America, Warden applied to the Presbytery of Bangor for a certificate of his licence to preach. He was informed that "the Presbytery from motion of prudence unanimously refused to grant it". In a farewell address to the Presbytery, he wrote:

Everyone of you has both publicly and privately circulated republican morality--that religion is a personal thing--that Christ is the head of the Church--that his Kingdom is not of this world--that the will of the people should be the supreme law;--and now from terror . . . you have met as a military inquisition.

== United States and France ==
=== Teacher and diplomat ===
Rather than seek a new licence to preach, in New York he found employment as a teacher, first as principal of the Columbia Academy in Kinderhook, and in 1801 head tutor at nearby Kingston Academy in Ulster county. He also tutored the family of John Armstrong Jr. When in 1806 President Jefferson appointed the Revolutionary War general Minister to the court of Napoleon, Warden accompanied him as legation secretary to Paris.

In 1808 Jefferson appointed Warden consul pro tempore, but despite loyalty shown in defence of his employer when attacked by Federalist press, in September 1810 Armstrong relieved Warden of his duties, two days before relinquishing his own position.

In the United States, Jefferson (to whom Warden continued to send political reports from Paris) interceded with his successor in the White House, James Madison. He described Warden as "a perfectly good humored, inoffensive man, a man of science and I observe a great favorite of those of Paris… ". Warden was also favoured by Eliza Parke Curtis, granddaughter of George Washington and a close friend of Dolly Madison, the President's wife. Further support was offered by the network United Irish exiles, among them Thomas Addis Emmet, William MacNeven, William Sinclair and John Chambers, and on other Ulster Presbyterian immigrants who had been significant to Democratic-Republican electoral successes in major eastern cities.

=== Consul in Paris ===
In August 1811 Warden returned to Paris as Consul. A year later, Madison added the duties of “Agent of American Prize-causes”: Warden was to assist with deluge of claims from American shippers, merchants and insurers arising from the zealous enforcement at sea of the Napoleon's Continental System of embargo against Britain. Warden found the new ambassador, Joel Barlow, more sympathetic: Barlow had lived in Paris under the Republic and had been a friend of Thomas Paine.

When, at the end of 1812, Barlow unexpectedly died, Warden succeeded in having himself recognised by the French foreign minister, the duc de Bassano, as American "consul general". The arrogation of office did not sit well with rivals in the service, or with the incoming ambassador. William H. Crawford found himself having to contend with a subordinate who dined with de Bassano, socialised with Empress Joséphine and attended theatre with the Empress Marie Louise. Notwithstanding his haste in getting his credentials recognised by the newly returned Bourbons, in August 1814 Warden was dismissed. He never again held diplomatic appointment.

=== Abolitionist ===
In 1810, Warden had not won friends in the Madison administration with his translation of the principal abolitionist reference in France, Henri Grégoire's De la Littérature Des Nègres (1808). In his preface, Warden noted that, "ardent" in their desire to amass riches, Europeans "affected to believe, that the black colour of the negro was sufficient excuse ... to treat him worse than a brute". But Grégoire had "proven by facts, that blacks not only possess talents, but also those nobler virtues that elevate man in the scale of being" so that for the loss of their liberty there can be no just argument or compensation. From Glasgow University Warden recalled the insistence of his teacher, John Millar, that any bargain entered into at the cost of liberty is unequal and "ought to be broken".

=== Decries the rule of commerce ===
Remaining in France, in 1813 Warden published his first book, On the Origin, Nature, Progress and Influence of Consular Establishments. It circulated widely in diplomatic circles, and has been classed as a "pioneering" contribution to "the emergence of doctrinal views and a specialist literature on international law".

Warden protested the tendency of American merchants to regard his consular services as an extension of their own network of foreign correspondents and factors; as a device for recovering losses and gaining competitive advantage but without the corresponding costs of commission. The fixation with commerce was in general to be regretted. Instead of "softening" animosities, commerce had become a source of international and social division.

At the shrine of commerce, the ruling powers of different countries have sacrificed the most solemn principles, and individuals, by a sort of Circean enchantment, have been transformed into monsters divested of everything that constitutes the social man. Nothing can be conceived more mean, selfish or contracted, than the mind of a person whose sentiments and thoughts are regulated by the balance of profit and loss.

He regretted, in particular, that the republican character of Americans had been tarnished by the "insatiable and indiscriminate pursuit of objects of traffic".

[U]nfortunately, the opinion, however ill-founded, is almost universal that every American is more or less engaged in foreign or domestic trade or barter; and the noble and independent spirit of the country is believed to be avaricious and commercial.

It was many years before the State Department would heed Warden's argument that for a consul "to be useful to his country in arts, sciences and manufactures, [he]must have no commercial engagements", that his salary be commensurate with his situation, and that he needed to be as much a cultural agent as a commercial one.

== Cultural ambassador and academician ==
=== Scholar and encyclopedist ===
Warden's observations on politics, literature, medicine (in 1806, he formally enrolled in the Ecole de Medicine de Paris), chemistry, natural science, and education resulted in a wide correspondence with, among others, Alexander von Humboldt, Joel Roberts Poinsett, Alexander Dallas Bache, the Marquis de Lafayette, Joseph Louis Gay-Lussac, Washington Irving and Thomas Jefferson. In 1809, Warden was elected as a member of the American Philosophical Society in Philadelphia.

In France, as a friend of leading French writers and intellectuals, Warden offered assistance to visiting scholars from America providing a bridge between the European and American intellectual communities. In 1819 his publication, in three volumes, of A Statistical, Political and Historical Account of the United States of America helped secure his election in 1826 as a corresponding member of the Académie des sciences, Morales et Politiques. The publishers of the encyclopedic series, L'art de vérifier les dates, commissioned him to research the volumes on North and South America in 1821. These ran to ten volumes and were written over thirteen years. In a "biographical sketch" of Warden's years in Paris published by the Institut Francais de Washington, Francis C. Haber described him as "America's cultural ambassador".

Warden was "among the active core" of the Société de géographie. With Edmé-François Jomard (an engineer-geographer in Napoleon's scientific expedition to Egypt in 1798), he was behind the society's patronage of studies of Mesoamerica. Their terms for a competition for the best new work on "American antiquities", including maps "constructed according to exact methods" and "observations on the mores and customs of the indigenous peoples, and vocabularies of the ancient languages". extended decades-old scientific practices to a new field of anthropological inquiry.

=== de Tocqueville and Ireland ===
Alexis de Tocqueville visited Warden in Paris before embarking on his travels in the United States in 1831. His Democracy in America may owe something to Warden's perceptions. It is possible that they also discussed Ireland from which de Tocqueville was to report in 1835, finding conditions for the majority not at all improved from those against which Warden had revolted forty years before.

Warden himself never returned to Ireland, although others who left under the same circumstances as himself did so with relative impunity. When in the United States he had shared articles from Irish journals, including the Belfast Monthly Magazine produced by the initiator of the United Irish movement, William Drennan. Although he contemplated writing a history of the United Irishmen, after the diplomatic restraint of U. S. Service Warden no longer seemed engaged with Ireland politically.

His papers reveal encounters with visiting Irish writers, among them John Banim, Maria Edgeworth and Thomas Moore. The circle they suggest, however, does not include Irish political exiles in the French capital. Warden does not appear to have regularly associated in Paris with Myles Byrne, William Putnam McCabe or John Allen, men who had assisted Robert Emmet in his attempt to renew the United Irish insurrection with a rising in Dublin in 1803. Byrne, however, does record in his memoirs an incident in 1820 when both he and Warden were together of assistance in Paris to the widow of Reverend William Jackson, "one of the first martyrs to the independence of his native land" (Jackson had been executed as a French agent in Dublin following contact with Tone in 1794).

On the title pages of his published works, Warden credited himself as a corresponding member of the Belfast Literary Society. The society avoided political topics: Warden was elected in recognition of on an American journal he had kept on weather, disease, and meteorological phenomena.

Warden did maintain a correspondence with William Sampson, a United Irish exile in New York, who had been three years in Paris. But their common interest was broader than Ireland. Sampson was counsel for the abolitionist Manumission Society and victor in the case People v. Phillips (1813) which secured recognition in the United States for priest-penitent privilege. Warden was able to communicate Grégoire's high praise for Sampson's defence of religious toleration.

After the union with Great Britain, Ireland had seen the birth of a new, overwhelmingly Catholic, national movement under Daniel O'Connell. Hailing him on his death in 1847 an "incarnation of a people", Honoré de Balzac noted that for twenty years O'Connell's name had filled the press of Europe as no man since Napoleon. Of this in Warden's extensive, wide-ranging, correspondence there appears to be no record.

=== Published works ===
- 180? (under the alias William Fox), A Narrative of the Principal Proceedings of the Republican Army of the County of Down. National Archives of Ireland 620/4/41
- 1802: A sermon on the advantages of education: preached in the Reformed Dutch Protestant Church, Kingston, on the 30th of April, 1802
- 1804: The frame of the material world manifests, that there must be a god: a discourse on the ensuing words of the book of psalms: delivered before the students in Kingston Academy
- 1808: (Translator) Antoine Léonard Thomas, Eulogium on Marcus Aurelius
- 1810: (Translator) Henri Grégoire, An enquiry concerning the intellectual and moral faculties, and literature of Negroes. Brooklyn, Thomas Kirk.
- 1813: On the Origin, Nature, Progress and Influence of Consular Establishments. Paris, Smith, Rue Montmorency.
- 1816: Chorographical and Statistical Description of the District of Columbia. Paris, Smith, Rue Montmorency
- 1819: A Statistical, Political, and Historical Account of the United States of North America 3 vols., A. Constable and Co, Edinburgh; T. Wardle, Philadelphia.
- 1820: Bibliotheca America Septentirionalis. Paris, L'imprimerie de Nouzou
- 1825: Description Geographique et Historique du Bresil, Paris, Madame Huzard.
- 1827: Recherches sur les antiquités de l'Amérique Septentrionale. Paris, Everat, Imprimeur-Libraire.
- 1829: Notice Biographique Sur Le Général Jackson, Président Des États-Unis de l'Amérique Septentrionale, Barrois Aine-Libraire
- 1831: Bibliotheca Americana: Being a Choice Collection of Books Relating to North and South America and the West-Indies. Paris
- 1832–1844:L'art de vérifier les dates des faits historiques, des chartes, des chroniques et autres anciens monuments, depuis la naissance de Notre-Seigneur, Vols. [33–37 and 39–44] written under the running title "Chronologie historique de l'Amerique." Paris, Moreau imprimeur.

== Death ==
Warden died on 9 October 1845, in Paris, where he had lived for the previous thirty-eight years. He had not married and was without family. He was a close (but not it appears intimate) friend of Elizabeth Patterson Bonaparte, Napoleon's one-time American sister-in-law. He was of practical assistance to the socialite when, after Napoleon's final exile in 1815, she arrived in Paris in the hope of yet finding advantage in her dissolved marriage to Jerome Bonaparte. In Warden's papers, she appears, next to Alexander von Humboldt as one of his most persistent correspondents.

== Sources ==
- David Bailie Warden Papers: Mapping the transatlantic network of David Bailie Warden, Dr Jennifer Orr, Dr Sharon Howard, Dr James Cummings and Dr Tiago Sousa Garcia, Newcastle University Research Software Engineering. https://warden.atnu.ncl.ac.uk/home
- https://viaf.org/viaf/301816047/
- https://snaccooperative.org/ark:/99166/w6h41skc
- https://www.worldcat.org/wcidentities/lccn-n87822182
- http://id.loc.gov/authorities/names/n87822182.html

American diplomat, author, and book-collector. From the description of Autograph letter signed : Paris, to Noah Webster, 1829 Sept. 17. (Unknown). WorldCat record id: 270659525

Author, book collector, and diplomat. From the description of Papers of David Bailie Warden, 1800–1843. (Unknown). WorldCat record id: 79455374

David Bailie Warden was a diplomat and teacher, and was elected to the American Philosophical Society in 1809. From the description of Papers, 1797–1851. (American Philosophical Society Library). WorldCat record id: 154298257 From the guide to the David Bailie Warden papers, 1797–1851, 1787–1851, (American Philosophical Society)
