= Battle of Ballynahinch =

Battle of the Irish Rebellion of 1798

- Part of the Irish Rebellion of 1798
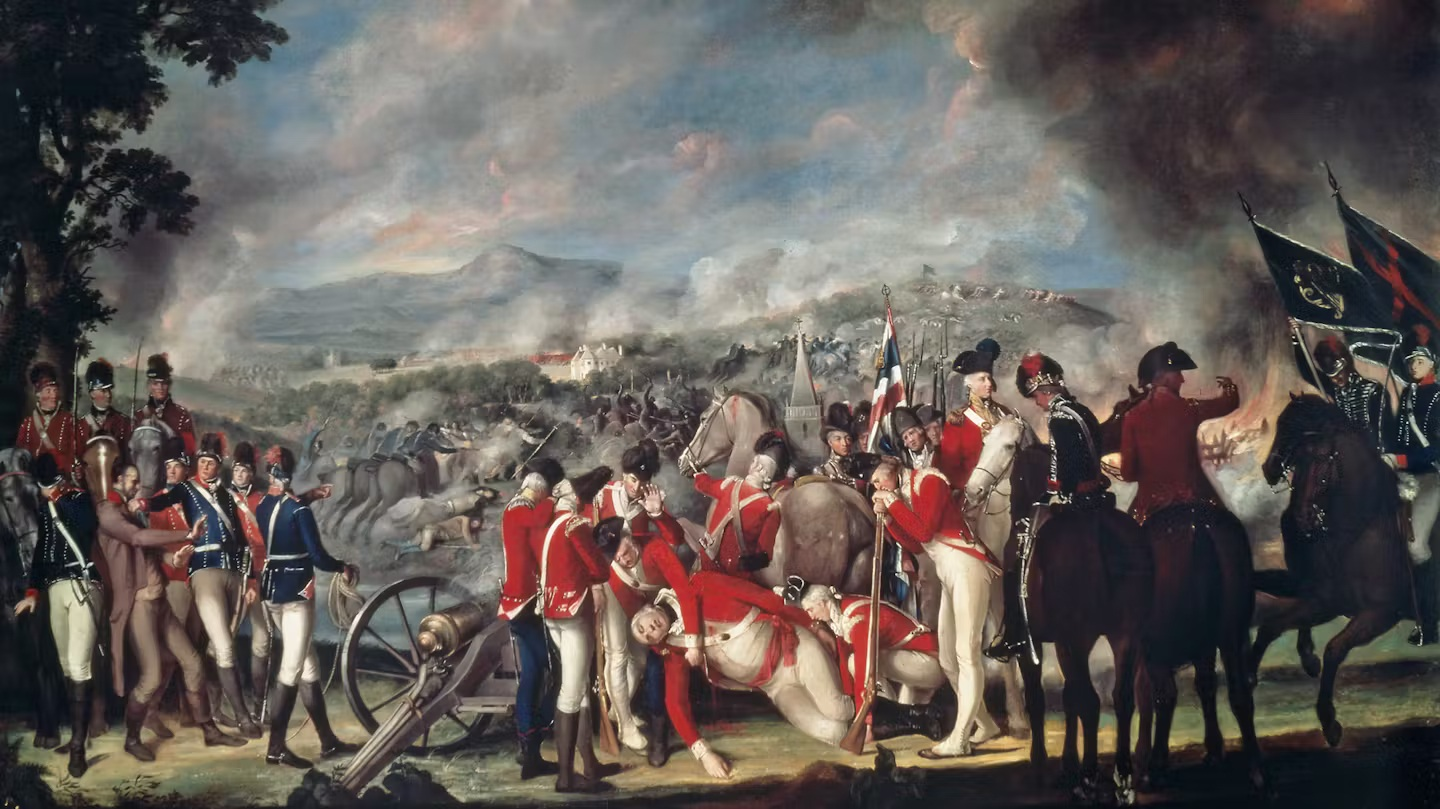
- Battle of Ballynahinch by Thomas Robinson c 1798
Date	12–13 June 1798
Location	Ballynahinch, County Down
Result	Government victory

Belligerents
Ireland; Great Britain	United Irishmen

Commanders and leaders
George Nugent	Henry Munro

Strength
~2,000	~4,000

Casualties and losses
40 killed	100–500 killed

The battle of Ballynahinch was a military engagement of the Irish Rebellion of 1798 between a force of roughly 4,000 United Irishmen rebels led by Henry Munro and approximately 2,000 government troops under the command of George Nugent. After rebel forces had occupied Newtownards on 9 June, they gathered the next day in the surrounding countryside and elected Munro as their leader, who occupied Ballyhinch on 11 June. Nugent led a column of government troops in 12 June which recaptured the town and bombarded rebel positions. On the next day, the rebels attacked Ballyhinch, but were driven back and defeated.

== Background ==
In County Down, the Irish Rebellion of 1798 by the Society of United Irishmen had faltered after the arrest of William Steel Dickson on 5 June 1798. Several rebel commanders, many of whom were Presbyterian, managed to briefly revive the rebellion's momentum. A rebel force led by David Bailie Warden attacked Newtownards on 9 June, which was garrisoned by a detachment of the York Fencibles. Fencibles stationed in the Market House managed to drive off Warden's rebels but subsequently withdrew, allowing rebel commanders to establish a revolutionary government modelled after the French Committee of Public Safety. On the same day, rebel forces managed to capture Saintfield after defeating its garrison.

In response, British commander George Nugent withdrew most of his forces from military outposts in the eastern region of the county, allowing rebels forces to amass in the centre of the county. Approximately 4,000 rebels from Newtownards, Saintfield and Ballynahinch, equipped with artillery looted from Bangor harbour, gathered in one spot on 10 June and listened to a sermon given by Thomas Ledlie Birch. On the next day, they elected a linen draper from Lisburn, Henry Munro, as their commander. Munro ordered his forces to occupy Ballynahinch on 11 June before establishing a camp at Montalto, the County Down estate of the Earl of Moira.

== Battle ==
On the morning of 12 June, Nugent, with a column of roughly 2,000 government soldiers (drawn from the Monaghan Militia, Fifeshire Fencibles and the 22nd Dragoons) and six 6-pounder guns and two howitzers manned by the Royal Artillery, marched onto Saintfield, where it was discovered to have no rebel presence. Nugent's column, which was reinforced by detachments of the Argyll Fencibles and Downpatrick Yeomanry, moved onto Ballynahinch, where his men captured a rebel outpost before occupying the town. As the night began to set in, Nugent's artillery forces began to bombard Montalto and the nearby Ednavady Hill. Numerous rebels, many of them demoralised by the bombardment, slipped away under the cover of darkness.

Stories of Catholic desertion at the Battle of Ballynahinch were common, although a more sympathetic account has Defenders decamping only after Munro rejected their proposal for a night attack on the riotous soldiery in the town as taking an "ungenerous advantage". These were denied by James Hope who had been one of the principal United emissaries to the Catholic Defenders. He insisted that Defenders had not appeared among the rebels in separate ranks, and that the body that deserted Munro on the eve of battle had been "the Killinchy people ... and they were Dissenters".

When dawn came, Munro's rebels attacked the town, driving back the Monaghan Militia in house-to-house combat along with killing the militia's adjutant and capturing several artillery pieces. However, the attacking rebels mistook bugle calls to retreat from government troops as a signal for arriving reinforcements and began to waver. In response, a counter-attack was ordered by Nugent's officers, which led many of the rebels to retreat from Ballynahinch in all directions. Nugent's dragoons and yeomanry pursued the rebels, many of whom were killed. Despite Nugent ordering his cavalry to "be merciful", infuriated dragoons and yeomanry killed several noncombatants in the post-battle reprisals.

=== Women combatants ===
Among those killed fleeing the field was Betsy Gray, later celebrated in ballads as having entered into fray on a pony carrying a green flag. The Freeman's Journal reported that two women (described by the then loyalist paper as prostitutes) had been killed after bearing the rebel standards in the field. Writing in 1825 James Thomson (the father of Lord Kelvin), recalls as a twelve-year-old accompanying women folk of his own family with provisions to the insurgents and hearing reports that two or three women "remained on the field during the battle, submitting to their share of its labours and dangers and performing as valiant deeds as the men".

== Aftermath ==
The rebel defeat was complete. The Belfast News Letter reported on 29 June that "It is now a common saying among the folk in the Ards, County of Down, with that shrewdness for which our northerners are remarkable, that nobody will ever prevail on them to go to catch cannon balls on the points of pikes and pitchforks again."

Nugent reported to General John Knox that his troops had killed 500 rebels. Local people thought the number closer to 100. The Crown lost about 40. Noting that "the Rebellion here is entirely crushed" and that, without French arms, the rebels would remain powerless, he had offered them "a promise of pardon, excepting their leaders".

Monro was executed by hanging on 16 June after being captured, a fate he shared with many fellow rebel prisoners. Sixty-three houses in Ballynahinch were burnt by Nugent's forces during the battle, most of them on the night of 12 June as his men became drunk and started to loot the town, causing 20,000 pounds of damage. After the battle, residents of Ballynahinch who had fled the town when the rebels occupied it began to return, wearing white headbands and calling themselves the "Supplementary Yeomanry"; these people also looted the damaged town.

According to historian A. T. Q. Stewart,

Though the principles of the original United Irishmen had inculcated a brotherhood of affection among Irishmen, the effect of 1798 in the North was painfully to emphasise divisions which already existed in religion and society. Catholic soldiers fought with Protestant rebels, and sometimes with Orange yeomanry. Neighbour hunted down neighbour, Church of Ireland was set against Presbyterian, landlord against tenant, engendering feuds among families which have lasted almost to the present. Apart from an assembly of several thousand United Irishmen near Maghera, County Derry, which quickly dispersed, the rebellion was confined to the counties of Antrim and Down, the area east of the Bann. Astonishingly, not one of the other seven Ulster counties took part. Republicanism, which was intended to free the Irish people from sectarianism, became in the nineteenth century part of the dispute.
