= Henry Munro (United Irishman) =

United Irishman born in Lisburn, County Down

Henry Munro (1758 – 1798) was a United Irishman born in Lisburn, County Down, who in 1798 commanded rebel forces, the United Army of Down, at the Battle of Ballynahinch.

Depiction of Henry Munro commanding Irish Rebel forces during the Battle of Ballynahinch

== Life ==
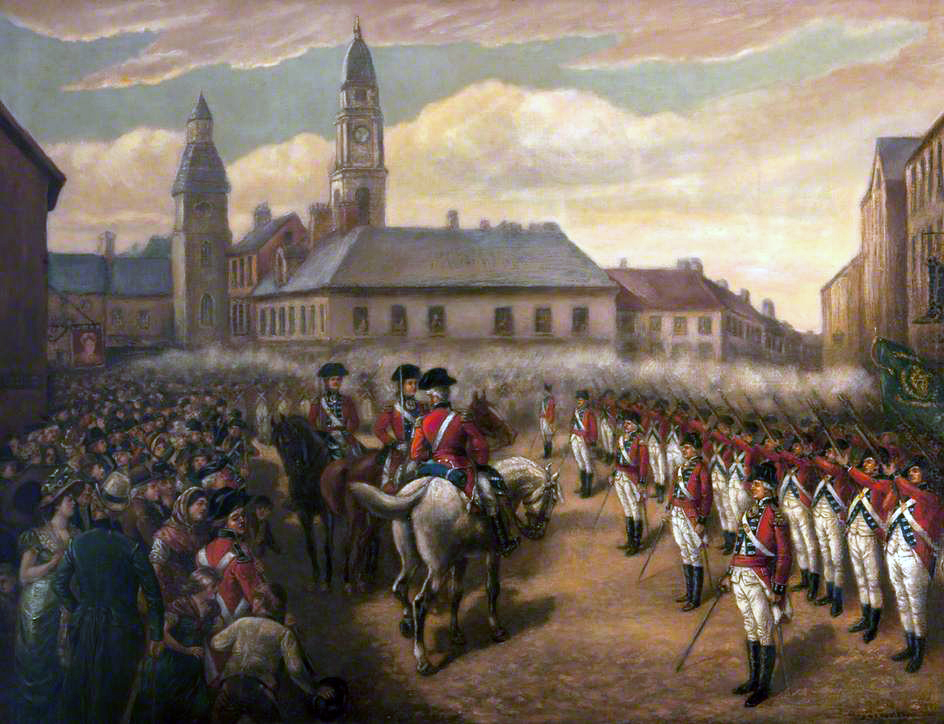
The Lisburn and Lambeg Volunteers firing a feu de joie in honour of the Dungannon Convention, 1782; Henry Munro is said to be the man behind the lady with a headscarf, with his hand to his chin

He was the only son of a Presbyterian tradesman of Scottish descent settled at Lisburn. His father died in 1793, leaving a widow whose maiden name had been Gorman. She brought up Henry and her two daughters in the Church of Ireland and died at Lisburn about 1832.

Henry received a mercantile education in his native town, and having gone through an apprenticeship entered the linen business about 1788. He afterwards paid frequent visits to England to buy silks and cloth and sell linen. While still a youth he joined the Irish Volunteers and is said to have been adjutant of the Lisburn corps.

He is described as rather under middle height but strong and agile, with deep blue eyes and an intelligent expression, honourable in his dealings and prosperous in trade, a good speaker, romantic in his views and without decided intellectual tastes. In 1795, he joined the United Irishmen, with the view of forwarding the cause of Catholic emancipation and parliamentary reform.

== Battle of Ballynahinch ==
On the outbreak of the rebellion in Co. Down in the early summer of 1798, Munro, after the arrest of William Steel Dickson, was chosen by the committee of leaders at Belfast to take the command. On 11 June, while at the head of a horse of rebels seven thousand strong at Saintfield, he sent a detachment to seize the town of Ballinahinch, halfway between Lisburn and Downpatrick. The town was occupied without opposition; but it was evacuated on the evening of the 12th, when General Nugent advanced from Belfast with a force inferior in numbers to the rebels, but much superior to them in artillery. During the night, word was brought to Munro, who had taken up a position outside the town, that the victorious troops within were in a state of disorder, drinking, burning, and plundering, but he declined to direct a night attack on the ground that to do so would be to take an "ungenerous advantage". The result was that several hundred of his best men immediately deserted.

About two o'clock on the morning of 13 June the rebels succeeded in effecting an entrance into the town, and had apparently gained the day when the bugle sounded for the retreat of the royal troops, and the rebels, mistaking the signal for the pas de charge, fled in disorder from the south, while Nugent's men were evacuating Ballinahinch by the north. The latter soon rallied and cut off the retreat of the Irish in all directions but one. Through this loophole, Munro led about 150 men after the rest had been hopelessly routed. In the pursuit, no quarter was given.

In a story that recalls the legendary tale of young Betsy Gray, according to the later recollections of a contemporary Munro's mother claimed that her daughter, Munro's sister, "Peg," had ridden onto the field of battle. Peg Munro was mounted on a grey pony and wore a grey sash.

== Arrest and execution ==
Munro fled alone to the mountains. Betrayed by a man he had paid to shelter him, he was taken early in the morning of 15 June about six miles from Ballynahinch. He was immediately removed with one Kane, or Keane, who was captured at the same time, to Hillsborough, whence he was taken to Lisburn, tried by court-martial, and hanged opposite his own door, and in sight, it was said, of his wife and sisters. He behaved with marvellous coolness to the last. He settled a money account with Captain Stewart, a yeomanry officer, at the foot of the gallows, then said a short prayer and mounted the ladder. A rung gave way, and he was thrown to the ground. On reascending it, he gave the signal for his execution, after uttering the words, 'Tell my country I deserved better of it.'

For over a month, the severed heads of Munro and three of his lieutenants were displayed on pikes, one on each corner of the Lisburn Market House. Munro's house and property were destroyed by the royal troops. The green and white plume which he wore at Ballinahinch was afterwards given to Bishop Percy, 27 October 1798. Henry Munro's remains were believed to have been exhumed in 1843, during construction works on a family vault in Lisburn Cathedral's cemetery, and the identification of the corpse was confirmed by Rev. Edward Cupples, the Rector of Glenavy and Vicar General of Down and Connor, who had attended the execution as a youth. In the grave was also found an axe, which local folklore claimed had been used for the beheading.

== Family ==
Munro married in 1795, Margaret Johnston, fourth daughter of Robert Johnston of Seymour Hill in Antrim. His widow died at Belfast in February 1840. His daughter married one Hanson, an independent minister.
