= Waringsford =

Coordinates: 54.374458°N 6.110244°W

Waringsford: Irish: Áth an Bhairínigh
- Location within County Down
- Population: 129 (2001 Census)
- Irish grid reference: J226489
  - Belfast: 21 miles
- District: Armagh City, Banbridge and Craigavon
- County: County Down
- Country: Northern Ireland
- Sovereign state: United Kingdom
- Post town: DROMORE
- Postcode district: BT25
- Dialling code: 028
- Police: Northern Ireland
- Fire: Northern Ireland
- Ambulance: Northern Ireland
- UK Parliament: Lagan Valley

Waringsford is a small village in County Down, Northern Ireland, 6 km south east of Dromore. It is situated within Banbridge District. In the 2001 Census it had a population of 129 people. The village, despite the lack of services, has seen substantial property development in the last five years, helped by its rural setting, relative tranquility and close proximity to the A1.

The village lies within the townland of Tullinisky, in the civil parish of Garvaghy, within the barony of Iveagh Lower, Lower Half. It also lies in Banbridge District.

== People ==
Betsy Gray, distinguished in the Irish Rebellion of 1798, may have been born on the outskirts of Waringsford.

== See also ==
- List of villages in Northern Ireland
- List of towns in Northern Ireland
