= Saintfield =

Coordinates: 54.46°N 5.83°W

Saintfield: Irish: Tamhnaigh Naomh; Scots: Sanfiel
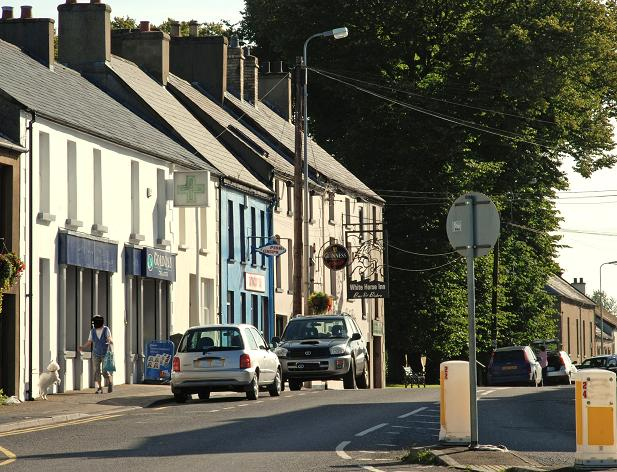
- Main Street, Saintfield

- Location within County Down
- Population: 3,588 (2021 census)
- District: Newry, Mourne and Down
- County: County Down
- Country: Northern Ireland
- Sovereign state: United Kingdom
- Post town: BALLYNAHINCH
- Postcode district: BT24
- Dialling code: 028
- UK Parliament: Strangford (until 2024) Belfast South and Mid Down (from 2024 General Election)
- NI Assembly: Strangford

Saintfield (from Irish Tamhnaigh Naomh, meaning 'Field of Saints') is a village in County Down, Northern Ireland. It is located in a civil parish of the same name about halfway between Belfast and Downpatrick on the A7 road. It had a population of 3,588 in the 2021 census, made up mostly of commuters working in both south and central Belfast, which is about 18 km away.

Running east to west across the A7 is the B6 road, and to the west of this crossroads is Main Street, which takes one towards Lisburn and Ballynahinch, and to the east is Station Road which takes one towards Killyleagh.

== History ==
The area that is now Saintfield was historically called Tawnaghnym (recorded in 1605) or Taunaghnieve (recorded in 1663), which is believed to come from the Irish Tamhnach Naomh or Tamhnaigh Naomh, meaning "field of saints". The English translation, Saintfield, did not come into use until the 18th century.

In the 16th century, the Saintfield area was part of South Clannaboy owned by Sir Con McNeil Oge O'Neil. His lands were confiscated after a false accusation of disloyalty in 1602 and were granted to Sir James Hamilton in 1605 who 'planted' English and Scottish settlers in the area. Saintfield was originally an early 17th-century settlement, with the first church being built about 1633. In 1709 Hamilton sold the estate to Major General Nicholas Price of Hollymount, County Down, who laid the foundations of the town and renamed it Saintfield in 1712.

Nicholas Price remained owner of the village until his death in 1734 and encouraged linen manufacturers and tradesmen to settle, established a barracks, repaired the parish church and established markets and fairs. The village had a number of corn, flour and flax mills, the remains of which are visible today, and has retained a tradition of textile manufacture through Saintfield Yarns. Development was continued by the Price family and in 1750 the family, headed by Francis Price, grandson of Nicholas, moved to a newly built Saintfield House, just north of the village.

Multiple churches were built in the late 1700s. The Price family rebuilt the Church of Ireland parish church in 1776, including an older church in the construction. The First Presbyterian Church was built one year later despite Presbyterian worship existing since the early 1600s. Society of United Irishmen members killed at the Battle of Saintfield in June 1798 are buried here. A Roman Catholic church was built in 1787 as the Chapel of the Immaculate Heart of Mary.

A new Roman Catholic Church (Mary Mother of the Church) was built to a Romanesque design and opened in December 1965 off the A7 road. It can seat up to 600 people and was the highpoint of the pastorate of Fr. Hugh O'Neill PP.

A Second Presbyterian Church was built in 1796 on the Ballynahinch Road. The architectural and historic significance of the town centre is reflected in its designation as a Conservation Area in 1997.

=== 1798 Rebellion ===
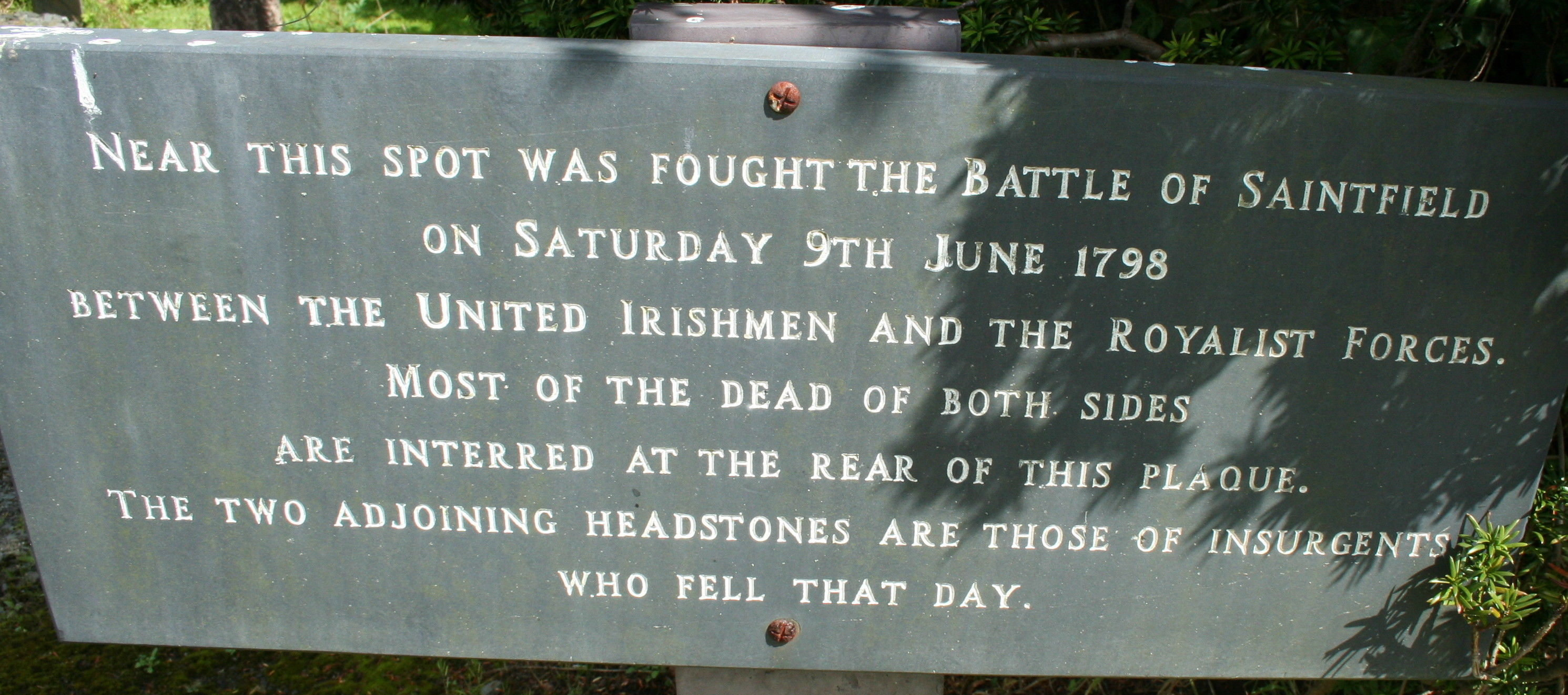
United Irishmen Plaque, Saintfield

In 1792 the Presbyterian minister Thomas Ledlie Birch convened a Saintfield branch of the Society of United Irishmen, founded the year before by liberal Protestant in Belfast, and moved their first resolutions. These called for "a more equal representation of the people" in the Parliament in Dublin and the recognition of "our brethren Roman Catholics as men deprived of their just rights". Faced with growing repression, the United Irishmen launched a rebellion in 1798, which began with a largely Catholic uprising in Leinster but quickly spread to the Presbyterian Ulster.

On 9 June 1798, during the Battle of Saintfield, a British force was ambushed in a wood near Saintfield. About 100 men were killed altogether, and the United Irishmen emerged victorious. The headstones of men who were killed in this battle can be seen near the river at the bottom of the First Presbyterian Church graveyard. Following a patriotic sermon delivered by Birch, the insurgents marched south to the main rebel encampment at Ballynahinch, where on 13 June they were routed by government forces. In the aftermath of the battle, Saintfield was sacked and only a few pre-1798 buildings remain.

The village was subsequently rebuilt. In 1802, the Price family residence in Main Street was converted to an inn. In 1803, the Market House was built. The White Horse Inn was also built and almshouses in 1813. However, the village declined from the mid-19th century, with population reducing from 923 in 1851 to 533 just before the First World War.

=== The Troubles ===
On 26 January 1974, soldiers from the Special Air Service (SAS) intercepted a team of loyalist paramilitaries returning weapons to a derelict farmhouse on the outskirts of Saintfield that was being used as an arms cache. One of the loyalists was shot and wounded in the chest as he entered the farmhouse and ascended the staircase. Three comrades waiting for him in front of the building were captured by soldiers emerging from a hidden observation post.

== Places of interest ==
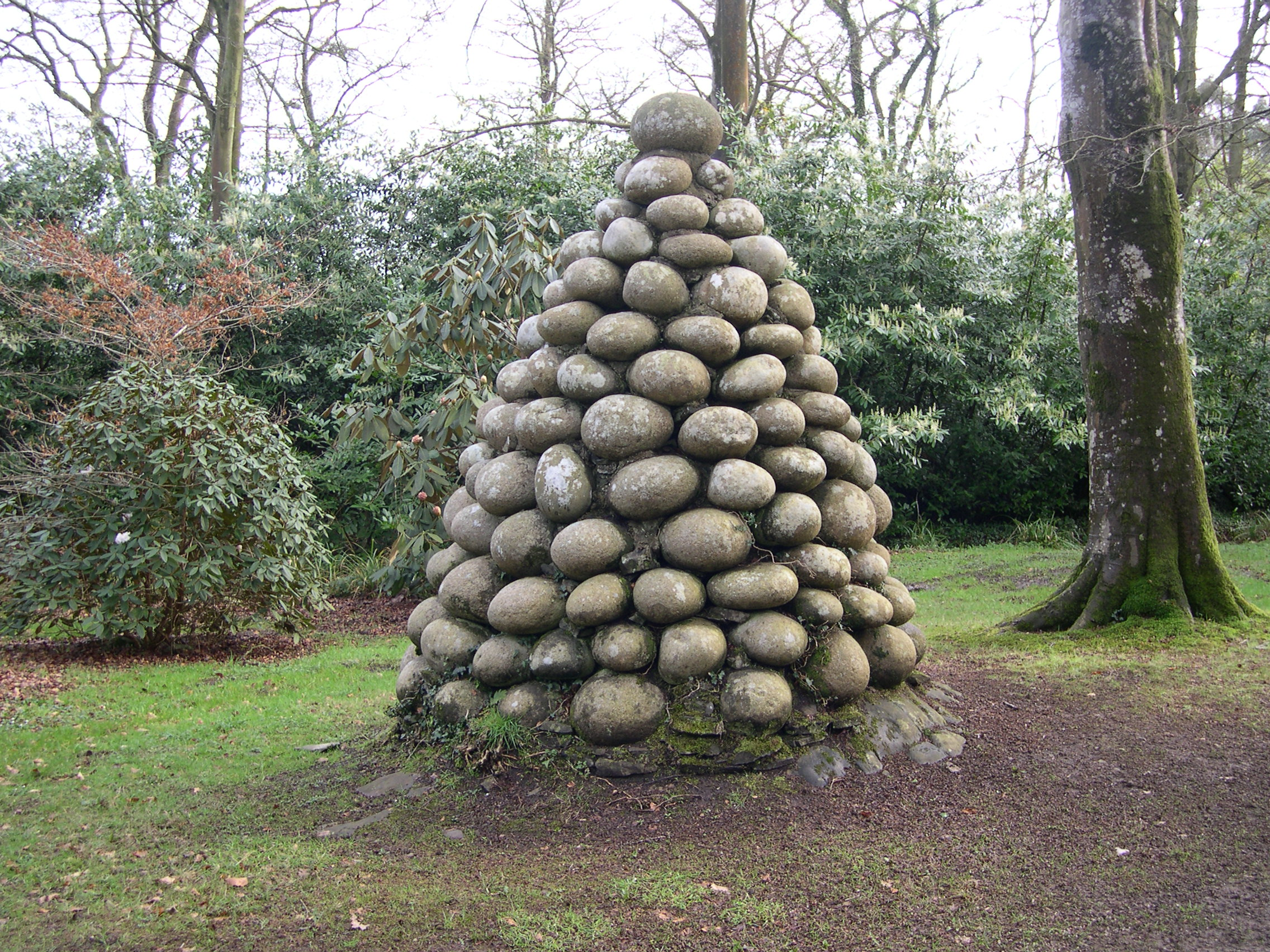
Rowallane Garden

- Rowallane Garden is situated immediately south of the village on the A7 road and is a National Trust property.
- A number of the buildings on the main street have old stables and courtyards behind them.
- The Market House (built in the early 19th century and now an Orange Hall) and the hotel (also built in the early 19t century and now a private house) can be seen on Saintfield's Main Street.

== Demography ==
Saintfield is classified as an intermediate settlement by the Northern Ireland Statistics and Research Agency (NISRA) (i.e. with population between 2,250 and 4,500 people). On census day 2011, there were 3,381 people living in Saintfield. Of these:

- 19.48% were aged under 16 years and 21.83% were aged 60 and over,
- 48.4% of the population were male and 51.6% were female,
- 26.32% were from a Catholic background and 65.48% were from a Protestant background,
- In 1837 the population of Saintfield area was 7,154 of whom 1,053 lived in the town.
- In 1851 the population of Saintfield rose to 1,104.

== People ==
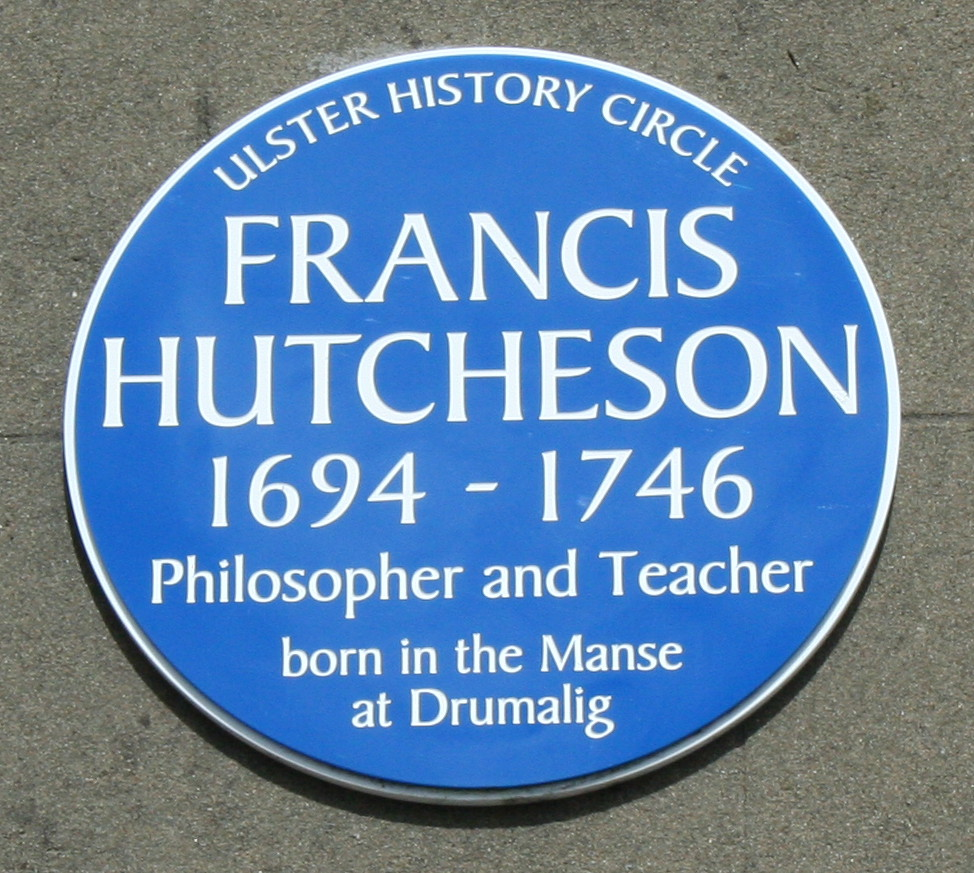
Plaque on Guildhall to Francis Hutcheson

- Thomas Beattie MP, Member of the Canadian House of Commons, born in Saintfield.
- Lynda Bryans, Television Presenter, from Saintfield.
- Matilda Carse (1835–1917), businesswoman, social reformer.
- Lord Faulkner, Prime Minister of Northern Ireland, died in a hunting accident at the Ballyagherty/Station Road junction just outside Saintfield.
- Francis Hutcheson, philosopher & teacher born at Drumalig.
- William David Kenny, born in 1899 in Saintfield, was awarded the Victoria Cross for gallantry in India in 1918.
- Bishop Daniel Mageean, Bishop of Down & Connor, born at Darragh Cross.
- George Morrison, Unionist politician and Mayor of Lisburn, raised in Saintfield.
- Rev. Coslett Herbert Waddell, Vicar of Saintfield, botanist.

== Religion ==
Despite being a relatively small town, Saintfield is served by five well-attended churches: the local Church of Ireland, two Presbyterian churches, Saintfield Baptist Church and Mary, Mother of the Church Roman Catholic Church.

== Education ==
Saintfield contains two primary schools 'Saintfield Academy Primary' and 'St. Marys' and one secondary school 'Saintfield High School', with a large number of its under-18 population travelling to schools in Downpatrick, Ballynahinch or Belfast.

=== Primary ===
- Academy Primary School
- St. Caolan's Primary School, Darragh Cross
- Millennium Integrated Primary School
- St. Mary's Primary School

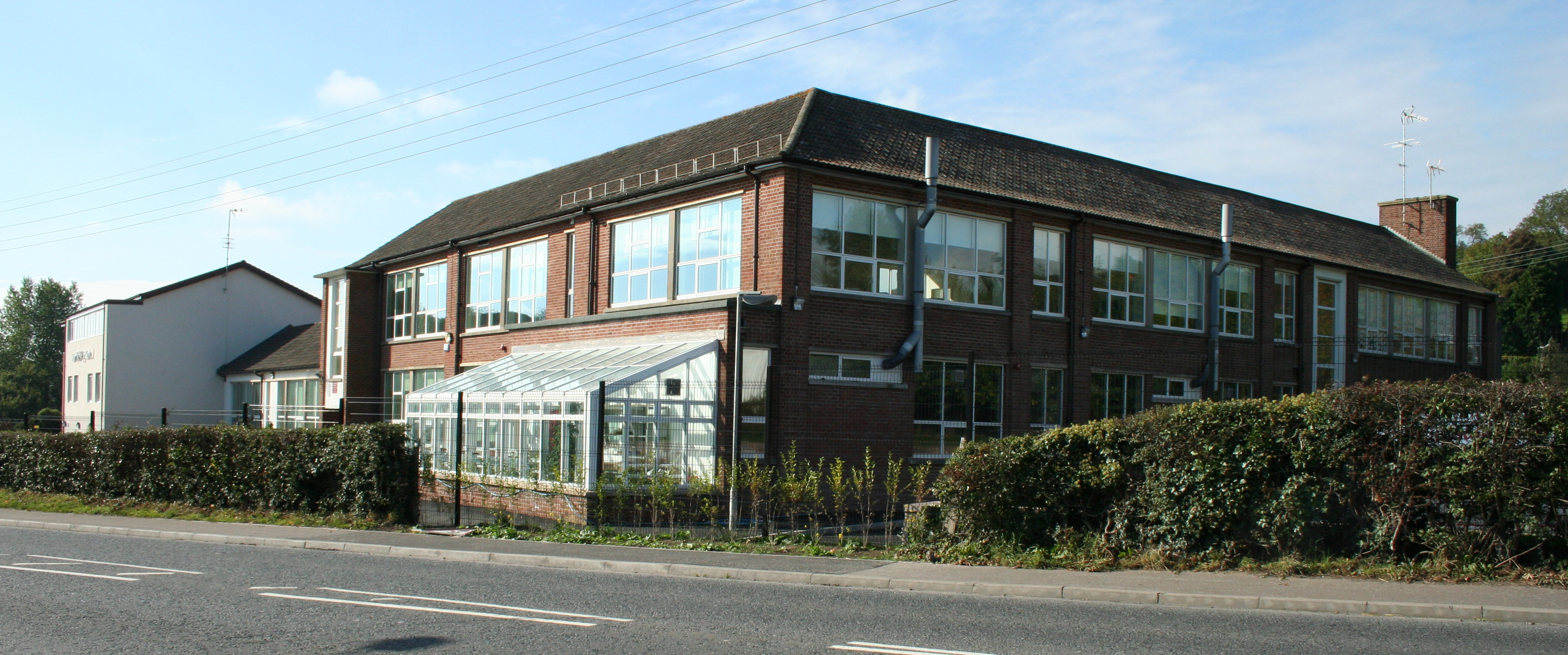
Saintfield High School

=== Secondary ===
- Saintfield High School

== Sport ==
Association football clubs in the area include Saintfield United Football Club and Saintfield AYC Football Club.

There is also a cricket club, Saintfield Cricket Club, and mens and ladies hockey clubs.

The local Gaelic Athletic Association (GAA) club is St. Mochais GAC.

== Groups ==
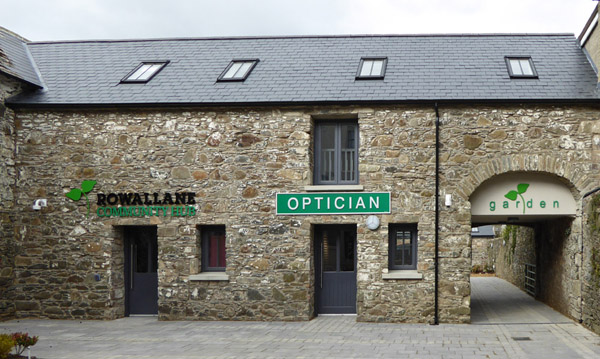
Rowallane Community Hub, 35 Main Street, Saintfield.

Local community groups include the 1st Saintfield Scout Group. This group is based in Saintfield Parish hall and celebrated their 100th anniversary in 2011.

Rowallane Community Hub (RCH) is based on Main Street in Saintfield. An Irish language society, Cumann Gaelach - Crois Darach agus Tamhnaigh Naomh, is also based locally.

== Transport ==
Saintfield railway station opened on 10 September 1858 and finally closed on 16 January 1950. The current main mode of transport is from the end of the main street on the A21/A7 which is a Translink service, Ulsterbus operates frequently to and from Belfast/Downpatrick.

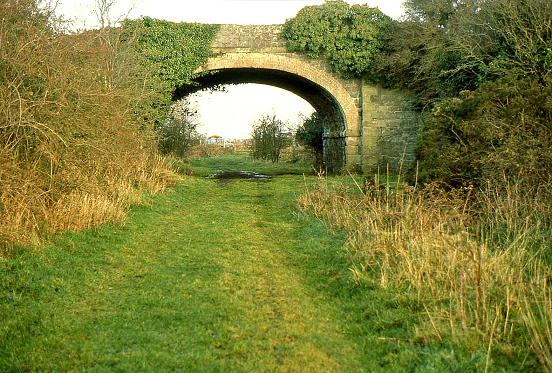
Former railway line near Saintfield on the Belfast and County Down Railway
