= Mount Panther =

Country house in Northern Ireland

Coordinates: 54°16′39″N 5°50′41″W

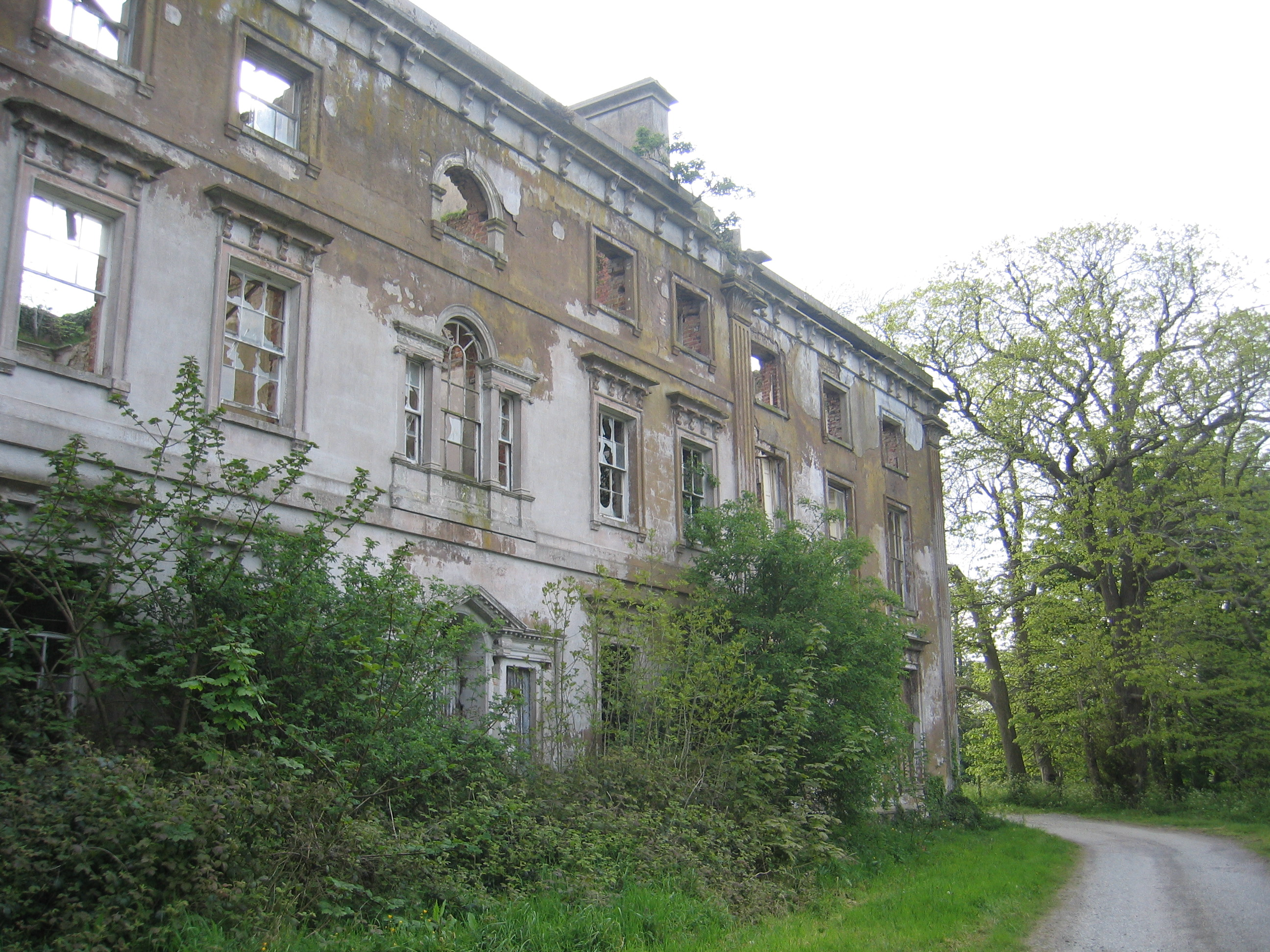
Frontage of derelict Mount Panther

Mount Panther is an historic country house located between Dundrum and Clough in Northern Ireland. The house dates from the 1700s and has been derelict for some years. In 2009 it was offered for sale for £5M along with 140 acres (55 hectares) of farm and parkland. In 2014 it was considered a complete ruin with a reduced demesne of 80 acres (30 hectares). It is a listed building of County Down since 1980.

== History ==
Described by the News Letter as a well-built elegant brick house with four or five rooms per floor, where the central portion of the building features a Diocletian window on top floor and a Palladian one below it. It was built about 1740 on almost 150 acres (60 hectares). The most famous resident was the writer Mary Delany, who married Patrick Delany in 1743, and divided her time between Mount Panther and Dublin from 1744 until 1760. They rented the house and during their first year in the house Patrick was made Dean of Down. The building was expanded with the addition of three bay wings and some rooms, such as the renowned ballroom,(subscription required) whose plasterwork done by Dublin stucco artists. This work was instigated by the 1st Earl Annesley who bought the property in 1772. The stable courtyard at the rear, dating from the late 18th century, was rather plain and contrasted with the elegant front to which had been added floating labels above the ground and first floor windows and the cornice featured Italianate bracket mouldings.

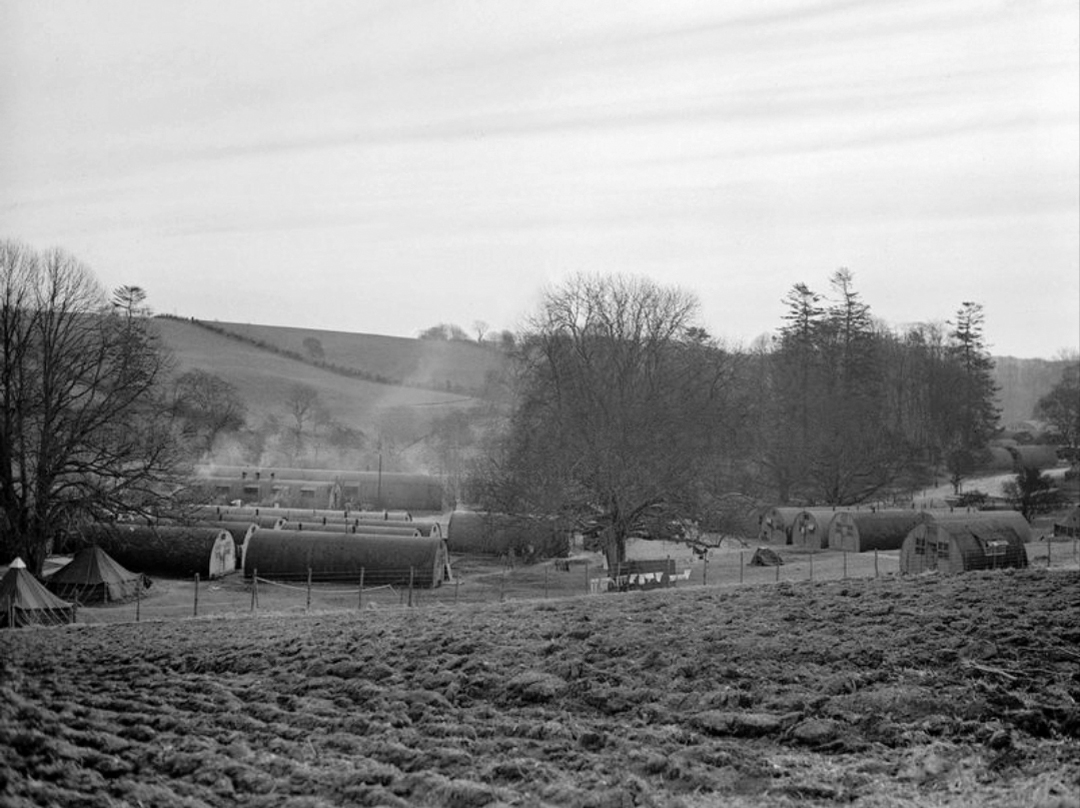
US forces Nissen huts on Mount Panther property

After the earl's death in 1802 the property passed through the ownership of Charles William Moore, Rector of Moira, and in 1822 was sold to William Henry Rainey to be sold just ten years later to a John Reed Allen, then Thomas Gracey and in 1931 to a Paddy Fitzpatrick.

During World War II United States Army units had Nissen hut cantonments at Mount Panther. The following were stationed here: 2nd Battalion 1st Armour of the 1st Armoured Division, 13th Infantry of 8th Infantry Division, and 21st Field Artillery Battalion of 5th Division. Princess Margaret and Lord Snowdon were impressed by the rococo plasterwork of the ballroom during their 1963 visit while Joan Collins and Jonathan Swift were also said to be admirers.

=== Decline ===
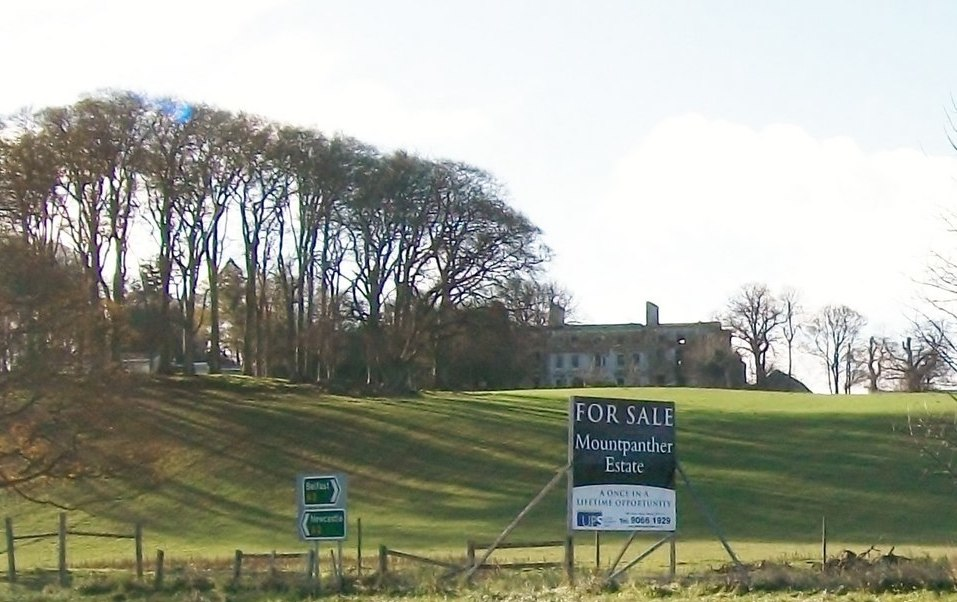
Mount Panther for sale

The house fell into disrepair from the 1960s with the roof being stripped and the interior plasterwork mainly removed, so is now an empty shell. In July 1980 it was added to the B+ listed buildings of Northern Ireland. While up for sale in 2008, representatives of Donald Trump visited the property and showed interest in the house and its then 170-acre estate as a potential golf venue.

== See also ==
- List of Grade B+ listed buildings in County Down
