= Delville House =

House in Dublin, Ireland

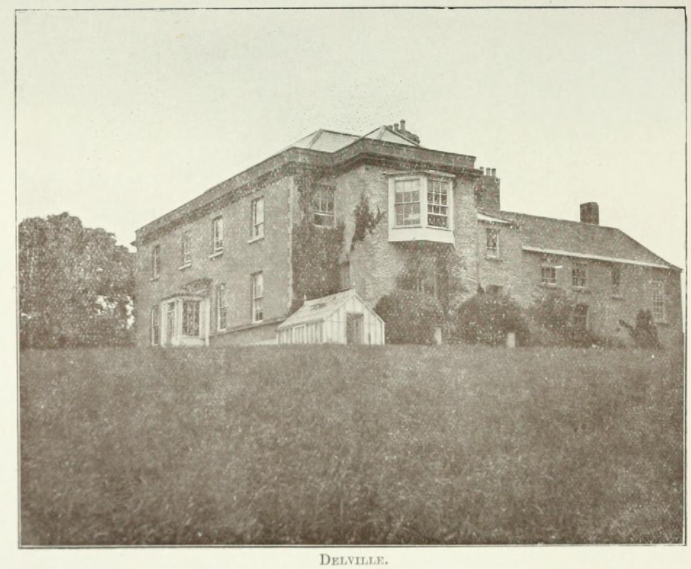
- Interactive map of the Delville House area
- Former names: The Glen
- Alternative names: Heldeville (until 1731)

General information
- Type: House
- Architectural style: Georgian
- Classification: Demolished
- Location: Glasnevin, Ireland
- Coordinates: 53.375436°N 6.267824°W
- Estimated completion: 1729
- Demolished: 1950

Design and construction
- Developer: Patrick Delany and Richard Helsham

Delville House was a Georgian house and gardens in Glasnevin, Dublin overlooking the River Tolka. It was most notable as being the home of Patrick Delany and Mary Delany and hosting many intellectuals and men of letters of the era, including Jonathan Swift and for acting as a form of salon for the Dublin area.

The house was located in an area that would have been part of the Manor of Glasnevin in medieval times.

== History ==
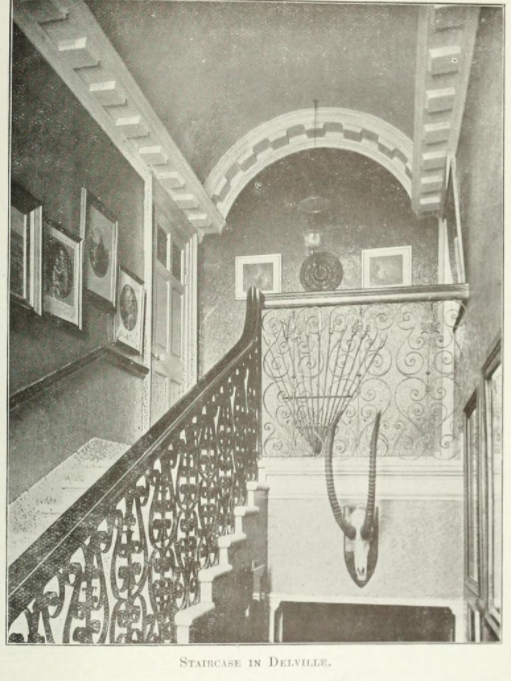
Staircase at Delville House, Glasnevin

The Georgian era house was likely built in 1729 on the front of an older building constructed during the 1600s. Although the house was relatively modest in size, it had notable interiors, particularly shell stucco which was created by Mrs Delany as well as a staircase with a wrought iron balustrade that was typical of the grander houses of Georgian Dublin. The house was also notable for its gardens, thought to be inspired by the writings of Alexander Pope which were also satirised as being too elaborate for the house. The location of the house and gardens were also influential in the choice of location for the National Botanic Gardens in 1795. The house adjoined the Church of Ireland church of Saint Mobhi which was built in 1707 and contains a memorial tablet to Patrick Delany.

The name Delville or Heldeville as it was once called, was said to come from a mix of the names of its owners 'Helsham' and 'Delany'. It was also have said to have been previously called 'The Glen'. When Delany married his first wife Mrs Margaret Tenison in 1731 he acquired sole ownership of the house.

The house was also notable for its connections with Jonathan Swift and it is said that some of Swift's works including Drapier's Letters were printed here. Swift and Stella regularly visited the house and were friends of the Delanys.

Letitia Bushe was a friend of Mrs Delany and she regularly visited the house to stay and paint. A painting of the house by her is dated 1754.

Daniel Sandford was born and lived at the house afterwards from 1766 for a number of years. His mother Sarah was a goddaughter of Mary Delany.

Robert Mallet lived at the house from 1836-58.

The house was owned by William Somerville, 1st Baron Athlumney for a period and may have been used as his Dublin residence. It was advertised to be let by him in the Dublin Evening Post of September 1851.

It was later owned by Patrick Joseph Keenan from at least 1864 and he lived there until his death on 1 November 1894.

The house was acquired in the 1940s to be used as a nursing home by the Sisters of Mercy nuns before being demolished in full between 1946 and January 1951 when the Bon Secours Hospital, Dublin was built on the site.

== See also ==
- Belvidere House, Drumcondra
- Drumcondra House
