= Patrick Joseph Keenan =

Irish educationalist and education administrator

Sir Patrick Joseph Keenan, KCMG, CB, PC (c. 1826 – 1 November 1894) was an Irish educationalist and education administrator.

He lived at Delville House in Glasnevin.

His son was the Australian lawyer and politician Sir Norbert Keenan.
