= Mary Delany =

English artist (1700–1788)

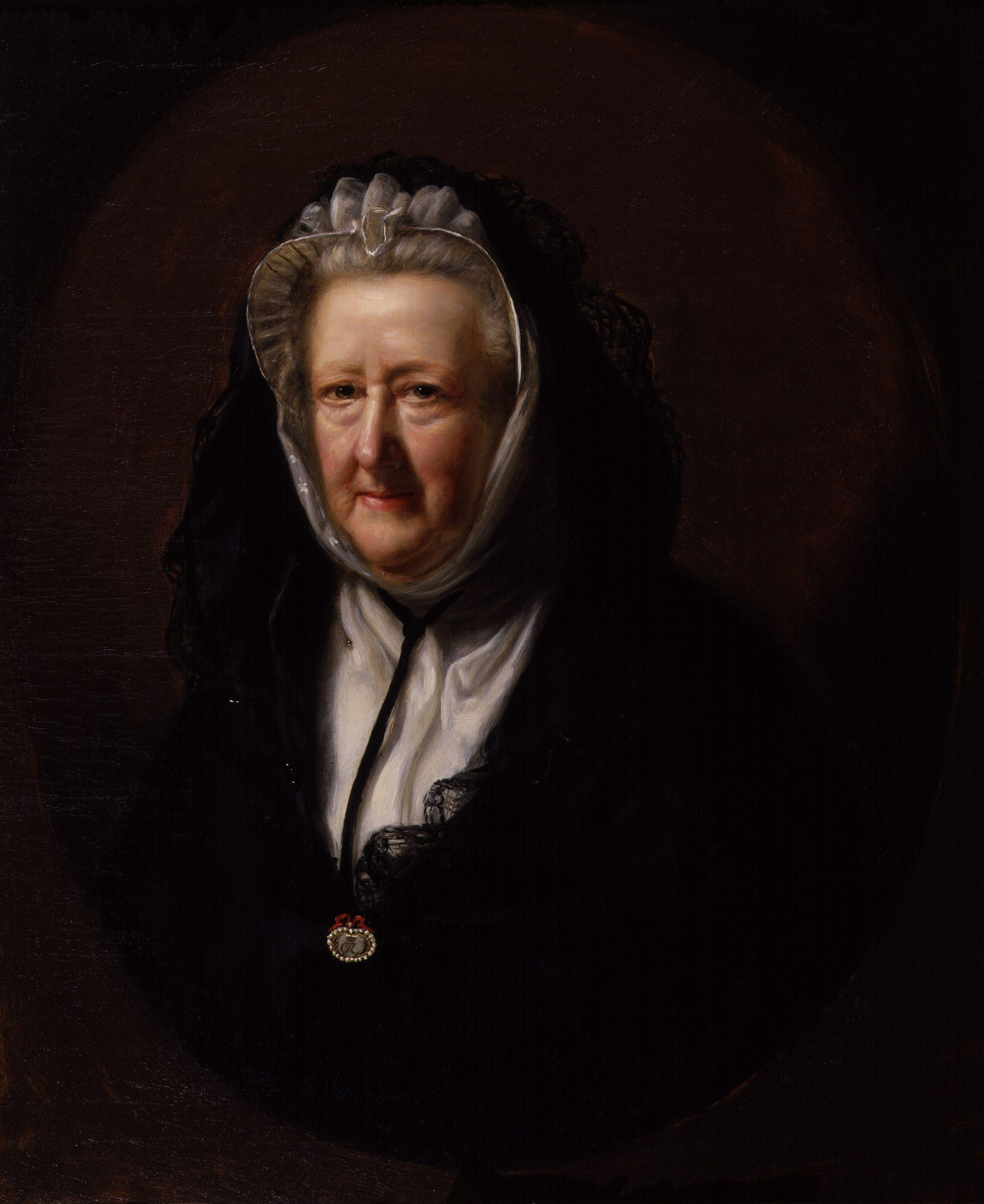
- Portrait by John Opie, 1782.
- Born: Mary Granville; 14 May 1700; Coulston, Wiltshire, England
- Died: 15 April 1788 (aged 87); Windsor, Berkshire, England
- Known for: paper-cutting, decoupage
- Spouse: Patrick Delany

Mary Delany, earlier Mary Pendarves (née Granville; 14 May 1700 – 15 April 1788) was an English artist, letter-writer, and bluestocking, known for her "paper-mosaicks", botanic drawing, needlework and her lively correspondence.

== Early life ==
Mary Delany was born at Coulston, Wiltshire, the daughter of Colonel Bernard Granville by his marriage to Mary Westcombe, loyal Tory supporters of the Stuart Crown. She was a niece of George Granville, 1st Baron Lansdowne, her father's brother.

Mary had one older brother, Bernard (1699), known as Bunny; a younger brother Bevil, born between 1702 and 1706; and a sister, Anne (1707) who married John Dewes (D'Ewes).

When Mary was young, her parents moved the family to London, and she attended a school taught by a French refugee, Mademoiselle Puelle. Mary came into close contact with the Court when she was sent to live with her aunt, Lady Stanley, who was childless – the intention being that she would eventually become a maid of honour.

While living with Lady Stanley, Mary became learned in "English, French, history, music, needlework and dancing...". She came into contact with Handel while at the household, listening to music he had composed; for the rest of her life she was a close personal friend and loyal supporter of the composer. Mary's hopes to become a lady-in-waiting were dashed by Queen Anne's death in 1714, which led to a change in power, and a Hanoverian on the throne, supported by the Whigs. The Granvilles moved to a manor at Buckland in Gloucestershire, where they became isolated from English society. However, Mary was able to continue her education and her pursuit of paper cutting, which had developed at an early age.

Near the end of 1717, Mary was invited to stay with her uncle, Lord Lansdowne, in Wiltshire. She was introduced to Alexander Pendarves during this stay, and it soon became clear that her family had an interest in a marriage between the two. Pendarves was Member of Parliament for Launceston and 50 years old, while Mary was 17. In February 1718, she was unhappily married to him, a marriage brought on by her parents' financial dependence on Lord Lansdowne, and Lord Lansdowne's hope to gain political influence.

== Married life ==
The Pendarveses left for Roskrow Castle near Falmouth in west Cornwall in April; once settled, Mrs Pendarves was able to enjoy the views that Roscrow offered, and was able to spend time riding. Mr Pendarves's gout grew worse as the year progressed, and in the second year of their marriage, Mrs Pendarves was forced to nurse her ailing husband, and pass her time sewing and painting flowers. In 1721, the two took a house in London and there, though Mr Pendarves began to drink excessively, Mrs Pendarves was reunited with many of her old friends. In 1725, Mr Pendarves died suddenly in his sleep. He had not altered his will after his marriage, and so Mrs Pendarves did not inherit what remained of his estate. "Mr. Pendarves, concerned with the bottle that allowed him to forget the loss of part of his fortune, had had no time to consider settling the rest of it on his wife."

Despite her lack of resources, widowhood provided new opportunities for Mrs Pendarves. Widows, unlike unmarried women, were able to move freely in society, and for the first time in her life, Mrs Pendarves was able to pursue her own interests without the oversight of any man. Perhaps because of her own unhappy marriage, she was not satisfied with the options available to women in the 18th century. She wrote:

Why must women be driven to the necessity of marrying? a state that should always be a matter of choice! and if a young woman has not fortune sufficient to maintain her in the situation she has been bred to, what can she do, but marry?

Mrs Pendarves was later described thus: "She judged everything and everybody for herself; and, while ridiculing all empty-headed or vain insipidity, whether fashionable or eccentric, was always ready to applaud the unusual, if sincere and worthy. She was eager in the acquisition of knowledge of all kinds to the end of her life".

After her first husband's death Mrs Pendarves spent time living with various relatives and friends. In the 1730s she leased a home in Upper Brook Street, from where she wrote some of her noted letters.

A wealthy friend, the Duchess of Portland, included Mary in her artistic and scientific "Hive" where she met Joseph Banks, the botanist, and she visited his home to see samples and drawings from his travels with Captain Cook. She bred plants, drew and portrayed with paper mosaics and needlework these exotic flora.

To begin with, she lived with her aunt and uncle Stanley, and after her aunt's death, she spent time in Ireland with the family of her friend Mrs Donellan. In Ireland, Mrs Pendarves made the acquaintance of Dr Patrick Delany, an Irish clergyman who was already married to a rich widow, Margaret Tenison. It was not until 1743, two years after the death of his first wife, that on a trip to London Dr Delany proposed to Mrs Pendarves, much to the dismay of her family. They were married in June 1743.

The Delanys passed a year in London before moving to Dublin, where Dr Delany had a home. They also rented Mount Panther in County Down and during their first year in the house, Patrick was made Dean of Down. Both husband and wife were interested in botany and gardening:

"Their mutual pleasure in their garden at Delville near Dublin in particular, his encouragement of her gardening, painting, shell-work and needlework resulted in a surge of activity in a variety of media in all of which the basic theme was the flower, whether in stocking the Delville garden, painting garden landscapes, decorating interiors with shells, or working embroideries."

After twenty-five years of marriage, most of it spent in Ireland, Dr Delany died in Bath, England, on 6 May 1768 at the age of 84, and Mrs Delany, now 68, found herself again a widow.

== Later life ==
As a widow, Mary Delany spent even more of her time at Bulstrode, the home of her close friend, Margaret Bentinck, Dowager Duchess of Portland. The two shared an interest in botany, often going out to look for specific specimens. It was during her frequent stays at Bulstrode that Mary became acquainted with two well-known botanists of the time: Joseph Banks and Daniel Solander. This contact encouraged Mary's interest in botany and also developed the knowledge on which many of her flower paper-cuttings are based. In 1769, she translated William Hudson's (1762) Flora Anglica into English. Although her translation remained unpublished, Delany's intervention in the text provides a clear glimpse into her botanical knowledge.

Mary Delany died on 15 April 1788. There is a memorial to her in St James's Church, Piccadilly.

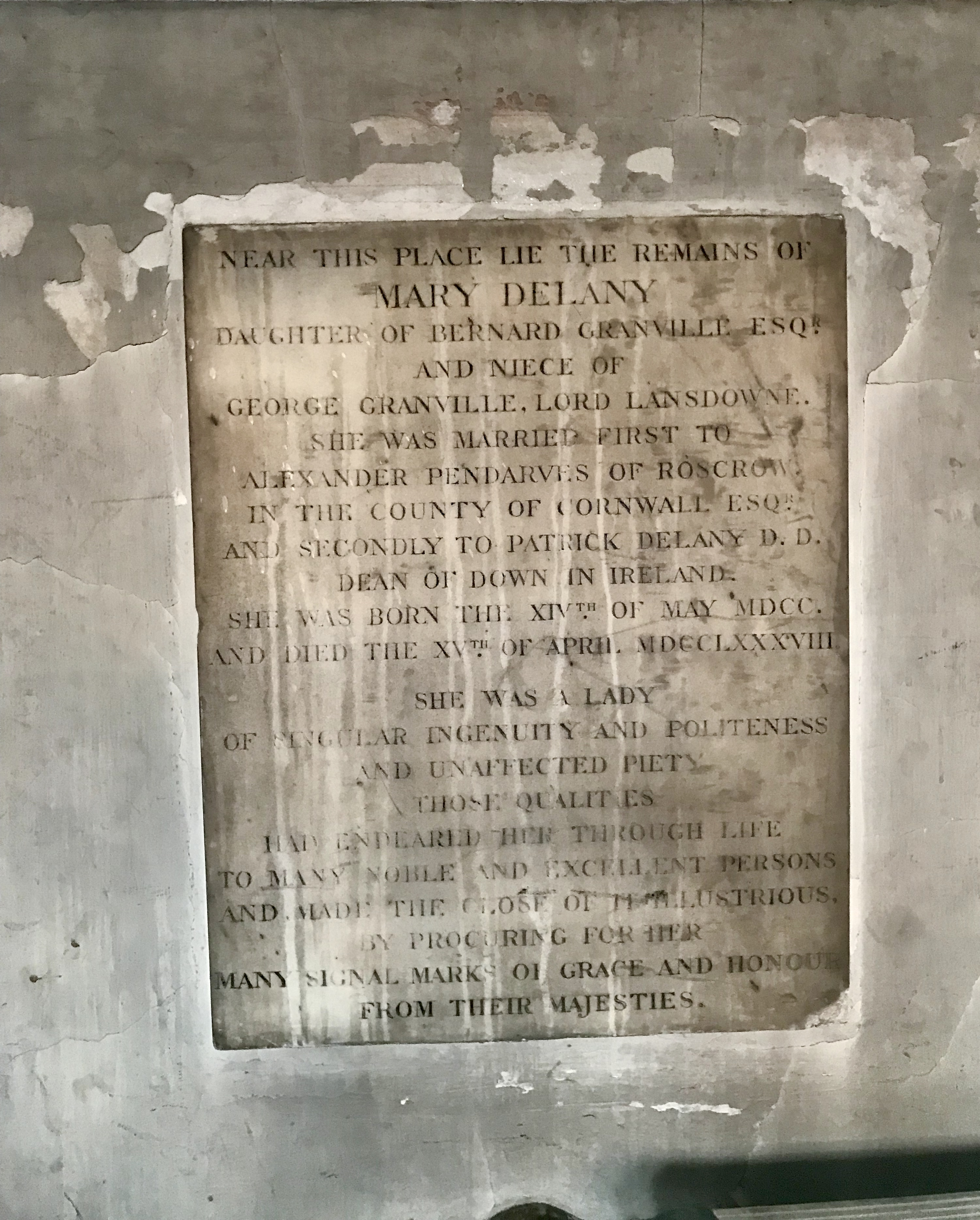
Memorial to Mary Delany in St James's Church, Piccadilly

== Career as an artist ==
Mary Delany had always been an artist, but during her marriage to Dr Delany she had the time to hone her skills. She was also a gardener, and did needlework, drawing, and painting; but was best known for her paper-cutting:

"For these 'mosaicks' are coloured paper representing not only conspicuous details but also contrasting colours or shades of the same colour so that every effect of light is caught". She struck up a friendship with Letitia Bushe, a watercolourist and miniaturist, with whom she embarked on a number of artistic projects.

In 1771, a widow in her early 70s, Mary began working on decoupage, a fashion with ladies of the court. Her works were detailed and botanically accurate depictions of plants, using tissue paper and hand colouration. She created 985 of these works, calling them her "Paper Mosaiks [sic]", from the age of 71 to 88, when her eyesight failed her.

"With the plant specimen set before her she cut minute particles of coloured paper to represent the petals, stamens, calyx, leaves, veins, stalk and other parts of the plant, and, using lighter and darker paper to form the shading, she stuck them on a black background. By placing one piece of paper upon another she sometimes built up several layers and in a complete picture there might be hundreds of pieces to form one plant. It is thought she first dissected each plant so that she might examine it carefully for accurate portrayal..."

Mary became well known, and donors began to send her flowers to cut. Her work can be seen in the Enlightenment Gallery at the British Museum. Upon her death, "The ten volumes of Mrs. Delany's Flora Delanica were inherited by Lady Llanover, the daughter of Georgina Mary Ann Port. Lady Llanover, who died in 1896 at the age of ninety-four, bequeathed these volumes to the British Museum..."

When her patroness, the Dowager Duchess, died, King George III and Queen Charlotte gave her a small house at Windsor and a pension of £300 a year. Mrs. Delany had become familiar with Queen Charlotte while living in the house at Windsor, becoming an important part of the inner circle of the court, teaching the young children about plants and sewing skills. The King and Queen were great supporters; she was given a locket of the queen's hair and a portrait of Delany was arranged by the king, then hung in the queen's bedchamber; they said of her paper-cutting, to have "...always desired that any curious or beautiful plants should be transmitted to Mrs Delany when in blossom."

By the 1780s, Mary had also become well acquainted with Georgiana Cavendish, Duchess of Devonshire, and Frances Burney (Madame D'Arblay) whom she frequently visited at her London home and at Windsor, and owed to her friendship her court appointment.

Mary had known many of the luminaries of her day, had corresponded with Jonathan Swift, Sir Joseph Banks, and Young, and left a detailed picture of polite English society of the 18th century in her six volumes of Autobiography and Letters (ed. Lady Llanover, 1861–1862). Burke calls her "a real fine lady, the model of an accomplished woman of former times".

== Legacy ==
The Ulster Museum in Belfast holds an embroidered bedcover by Delany, one of the few complete pieces of embroidery made by her. Other pieces are described in letters, including pieces sewn with violets, auriculas, geraniums, poppies, Madonna lilies. Her own clothes were embroidered richly, including a ballgown probably designed for the birthday of Frederick, Prince of Wales, in 1751 with pinks, lily of the valley, winter jasmine, scent peas, love-in-a-mist, anemones, tulips, bluebells and forget-me-nots in accurate anatomical detail.

In 1980, a descendant of Delany's sister Anne, Ruth Hayden, published a book on Delany's work: Mrs. Delany and Her Flower Collages, which was reissued in 2000 as Mrs. Delany: Her Life and Her Flowers (British Museum Press). A biography of Delany by Clarissa Campbell Orr was published in 2019.

In the 1980s, Irish fashion designer Sybil Connolly created a range of tableware for Tiffany & Co. inspired by Mrs Delany's floral collages.

In 2022, the 'Mortimer Sackler' rose was renamed 'Mary Delany' by David Austin Roses in honour of the artist. The registration name of the rose is 'Ausorts'.

== Gallery of Paper Mosaics ==
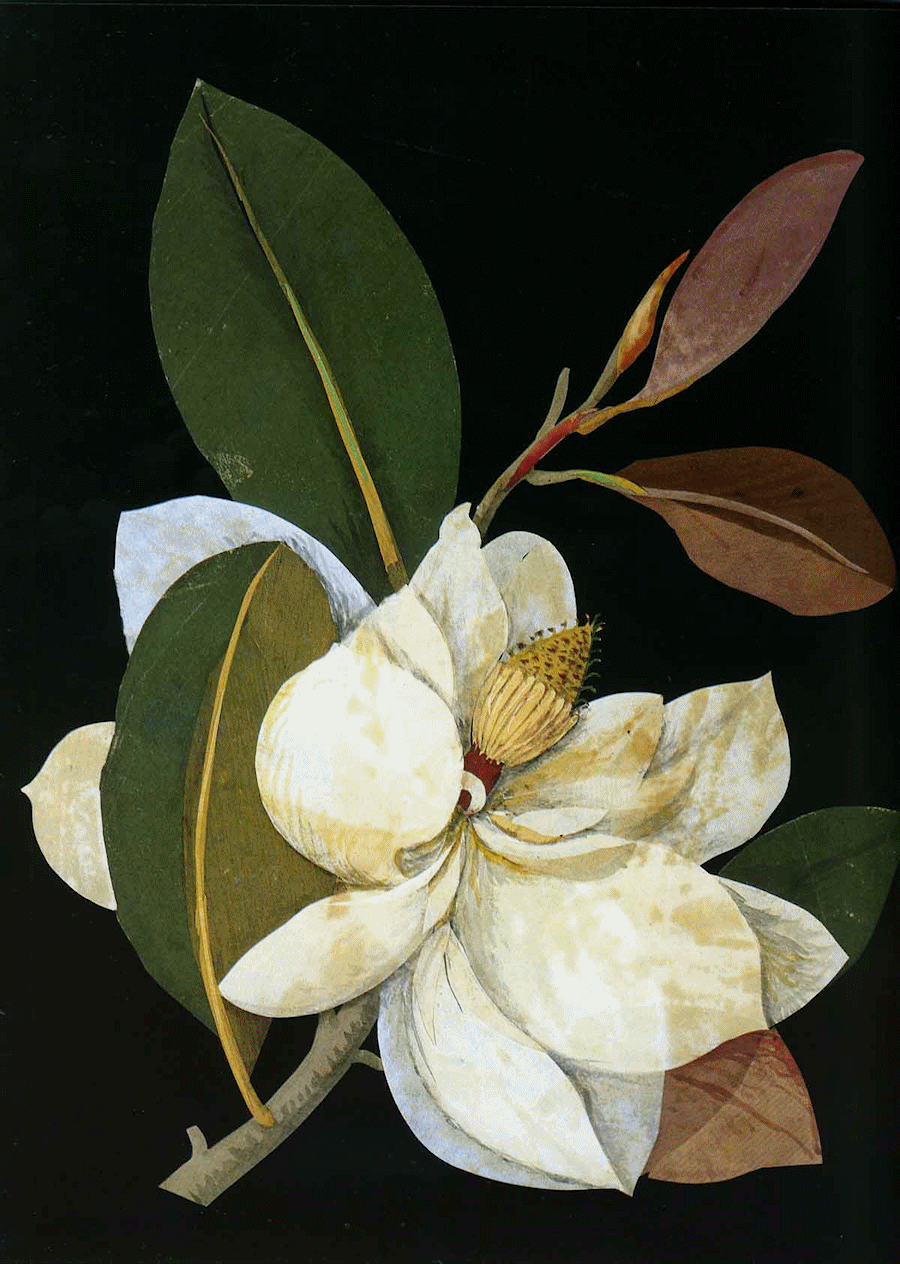
Magnolia

Passiflora laurifolia (bay-leaved passion flower), 1777

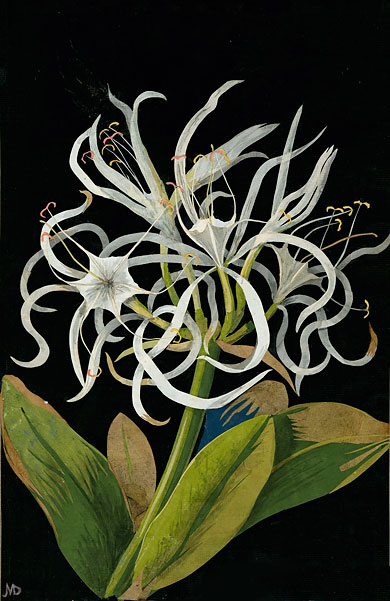
Pancratium maritimum (sea daffodil), 1775

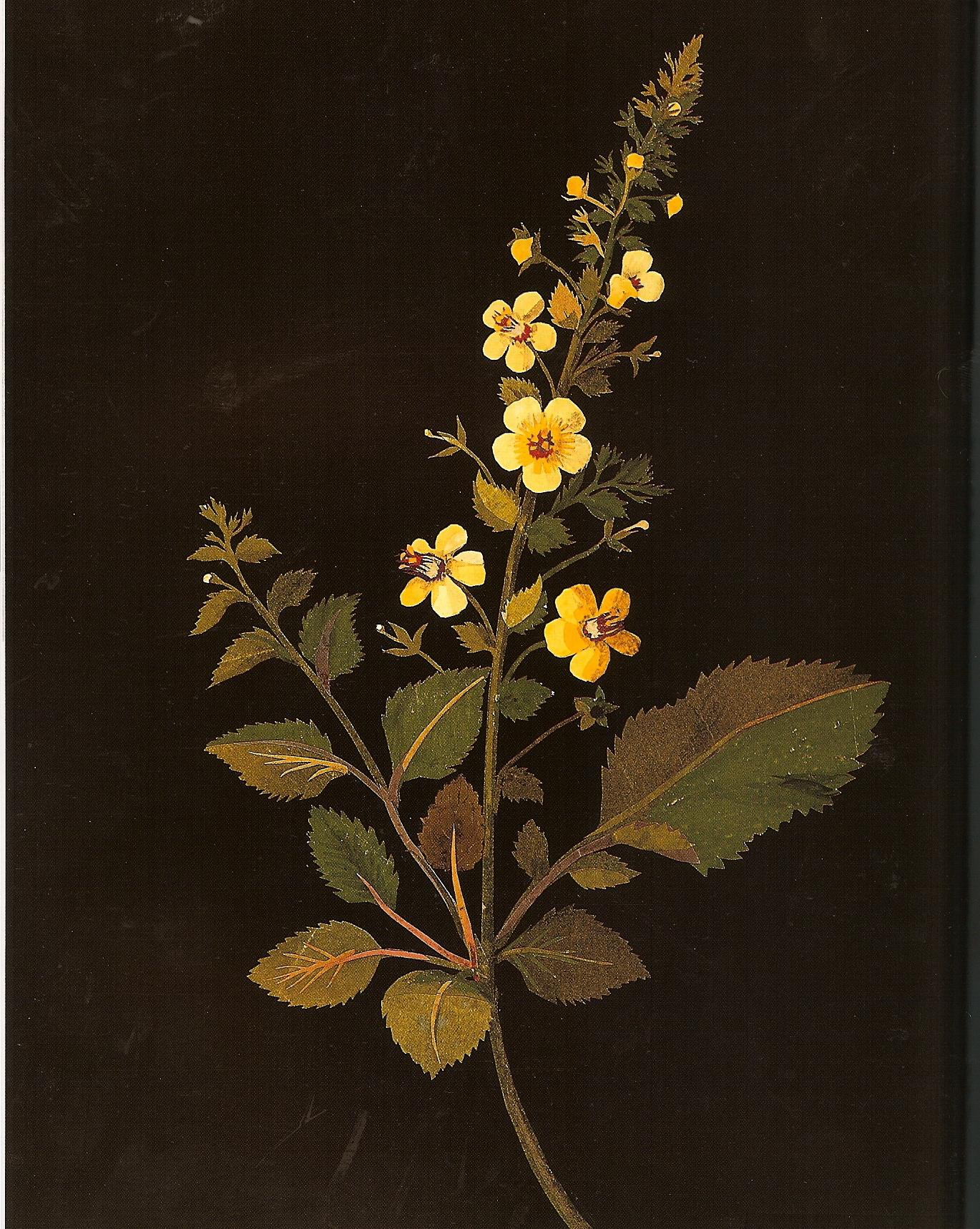
Paper mosaic

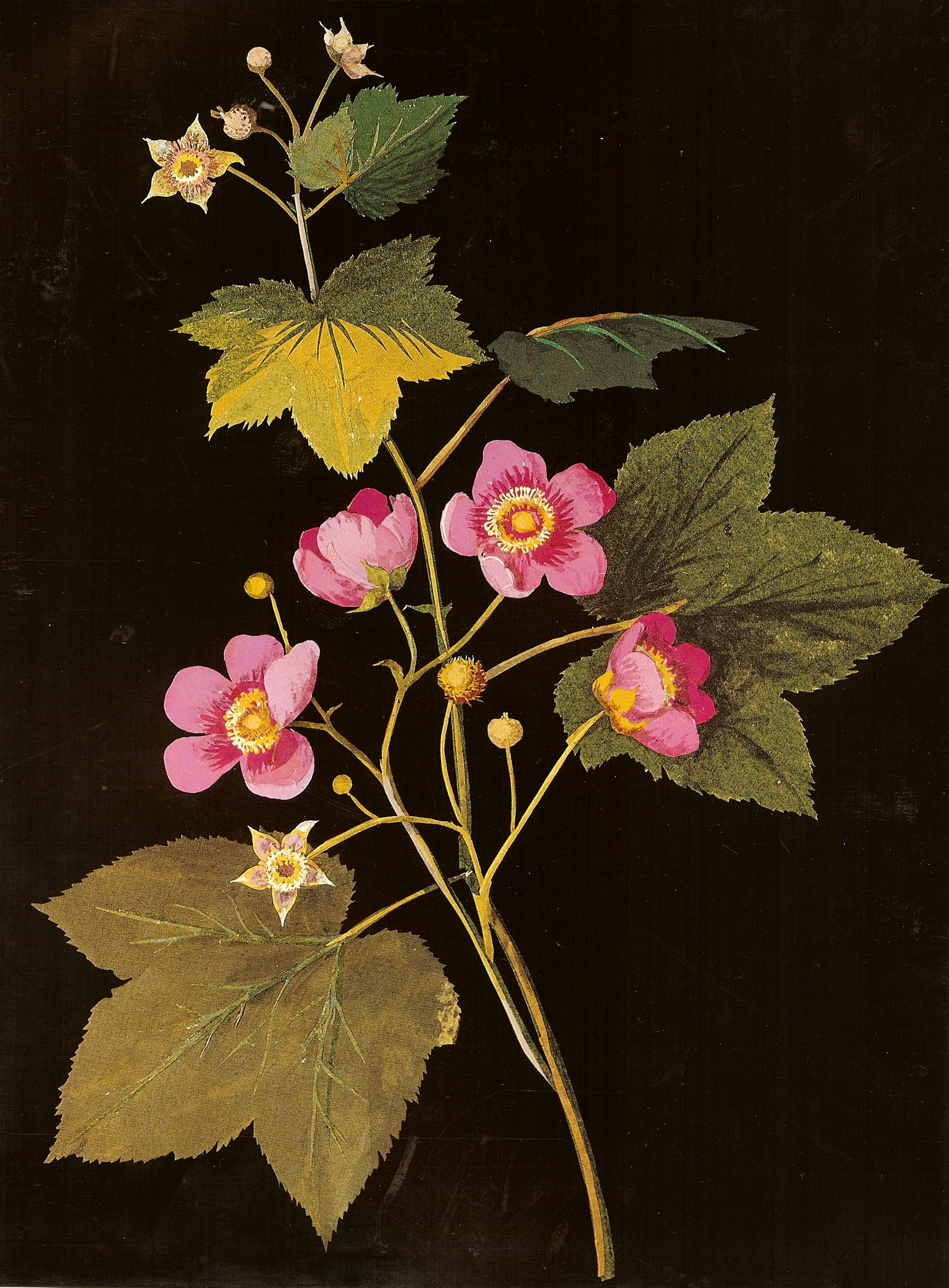
Rubus odoratus (purple-flowering raspberry)

Vicia sylvatica (wood vetch), 1776

Parnassia palustris (grass-of-Parnassus), 1776

Centaurea cyanus (cornflower), 1779

Pelargonium capitatum (rose-scented pelargonium)

Holly

Mistletoe

== Bibliography ==
- Blain, Virginia, et al. (Eds). "Delany, Mary." The Feminist Companion to Literature in English (New Haven and London: Yale UP, 1990) 278–79.
- Campbell Orr, Clarissa. Mrs Delany: a Life (Yale, 2019).
- Delany, Mary (Granville) & Lady Llanover (Ed.). The autobiography and correspondence of Mary Granville, Mrs. Delany : with interesting reminiscences of King George the third and Queen Charlotte: Volume 1, Volume 2, Volume 3 (London: R. Bentley, 1861).
- Delany, Mary. The Autobiography and Correspondence of Mrs. Delany. Publication date 1879
- Dewes, Simon. Mrs. Delany (London: Rich & Cowan, Ltd, 1940).
- Hayden, Ruth. Mrs Delany: her life and her flowers (London: British Museum Pubs. Ltd., 1980).
- Kerhervé, Alain. (Ed). Mary Delany (1700–1788) and the Court of King George III, vol. 4 of Michael Kassler (ed.), Memoirs of the Court of George III. London, Pickering & Chatto, 2015. ISBN 978-1-8489-34696
- Kerhervé, Alain. Une épistolière anglaise du XVIIIe siècle : Mary Delany (1700–1788). Éditions L'Harmattan, 2004. 500 p.
- Kerhervé, Alain. (Ed). Polite Letters: The Correspondence of Mary Delany (1700–1788) and Francis North, Lord Guilford (1704–1790). Cambridge Scholars Publishing, 2009. 150 p.
- Laird, Mark and Weisberg-Roberts, Alicia (Ed.). Mrs. Delany & Her Circle (New Haven: Yale University Press, 2009). ISBN 978-0-300-14279-2
- Paston, George. Mrs. Delany (Mary Granville): a memoir, 1700–1788 (London: Grant Richards, 1900).
- Peacock, Molly. The Paper Garden: An Artist (Begins Her Life's Work) at 72. New York, NY; Berlin [u.a.] : Bloomsbury, 2011, ISBN 978-1-60819-523-7
- Vulliamy, C. E. Aspasia: The Life and Letters of Mary Granville, Mrs Delany (London: J. and J. Gray. 1935).
- Wilson, Rachel, Elite Women in Ascendancy Ireland, 1690–1745: Imitation and Innovation (Boydell and Brewer, Woodbridge, 2015). ISBN 978-1783270392
