= Buckland, Gloucestershire =

Village in Gloucestershire, England

Coordinates: 52.0232°N 1.8834°W

Buckland
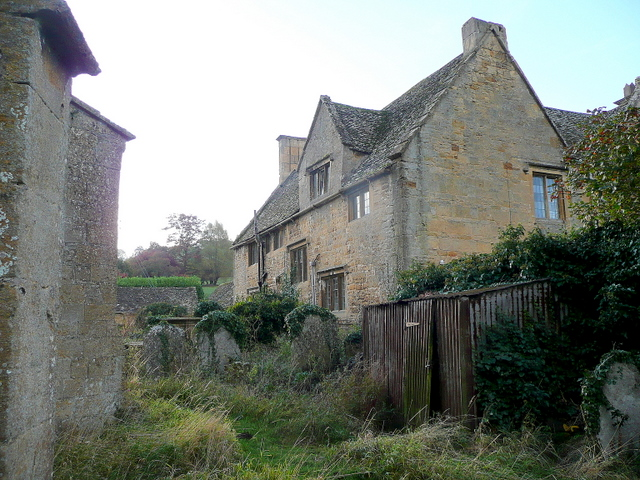
- The north wing of Buckland Manor, from the Churchyard

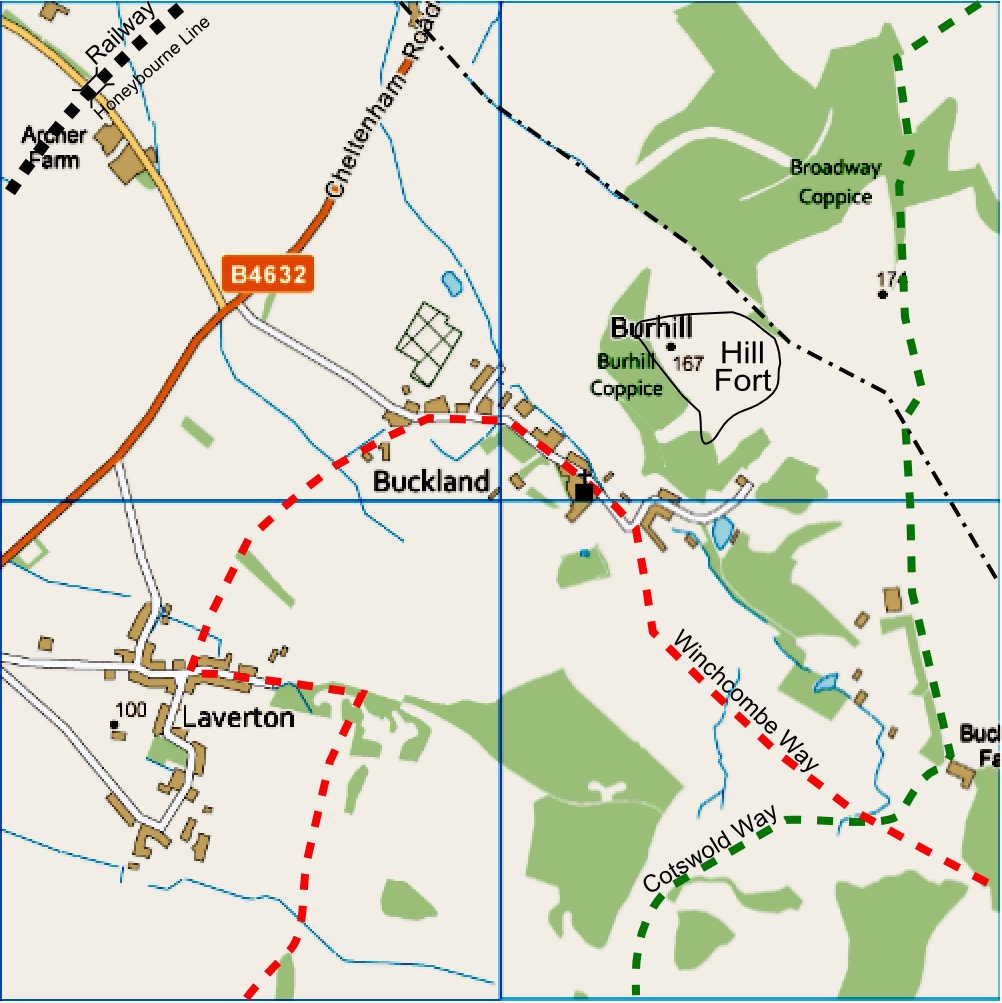
- Map of Buckland and Laverton

- Location within Gloucestershire
- Population: 224 (including Laverton) 2010 estimate
- OS grid reference: SP081361
  - London: 83 mi (134 km)
- Civil parish: Buckland
- District: Tewkesbury
- Shire county: Gloucestershire
- Region: South West
- Country: England
- Sovereign state: United Kingdom
- Post town: Broadway
- Postcode district: WR12
- Police: Gloucestershire
- Fire: Gloucestershire
- Ambulance: South Western

Buckland is a village and civil parish in the borough of Tewkesbury, Gloucestershire, England. The parish, which also includes the village of Laverton, had a population of 225 in 2010. The village is close to the Worcestershire border and 1.2 miles (2 km) south of Broadway. East of the village is the Burhill Iron Age hillfort. To the south, and within Buckland Parish, is the hamlet of Laverton. Within the village itself is the medieval Church of St Michael, a seventeenth-century manor house, and what claims to be the oldest Rectory in England.

== Hill Fort ==
Burhill hillfort occupies a spur on the Cotswold escarpment, overlooking Buckland and the Severn/Avon valley. Very little remains of any ramparts, except for a stretch on the eastern side, against the slope of the scarp, indicating an entranceway. The site was only identified as a hillfort in 1960. An area of some 3 hectares (7.4 acres) may have been enclosed, but on most sides the natural scarp is now the only remaining defensive feature. The whole area has been extensively ploughed, and within the hillfort, a scatter of early to mid-iron-age pottery has turned up. An area outside the fort, east of the entrance, has produced much greater quantities of pottery dating to the earliest period of the Iron Age, with many fragments of various jars and bowls. For website see www.burhillfort.co.uk

== The village ==
The name 'Buckland' originates from Anglo-Saxon 'Boc-land', meaning land assigned under a charter, as distinct from the 'Folc-land' which bases its ownership on folk-testimony. The Charter in this case dates to 709 AD, when Coenred of Mercia gave the land to St Peter's Abbey, Gloucester. The abbey had been founded 30 years before, and in 709 Coenred made this gift to the Church, gave up being King of the Mercians and went on pilgrimage to Rome, where he died. Buckland (which may be the manor described as Bibladene in the original charter), having come into the possession of Gloucester Abbey, remained so until the reformation, in around 1546. When the Normans took over, Abbot Serlo was put in charge of Gloucester Abbey, and under his stewardship Buckland, along with many of the Abbey's lands, increased in prosperity. By 1190 it had a church, although possibly this was at Laverton, within the parish, rather than in Buckland. The present Church, St. Michael's, has fabric dating back to the 13th century, and its rectory dates in part to the 14th century.

In 1086, the Domesday Book records 22 villeins, 6 borders and 8 serfs (slaves). By 1266, this had risen to 29 villains and 14 borders, with no mention of serfs. The villagers were in the main paying an annual rent rather than working for the lord, and the value of the rents was some 7 times greater than in 1086 (and 20 times greater than in 1066). In 1518, the site of the Manor was leased on a 31-year lease to James Appery, along with his wife, son and daughter. However, the lease was relinquished to Henry VIII's commissioners, following the dissolution of Gloucester Abbey, and in 1546 the manor of Buckland was granted to Sir Richard Gresham in exchange for his lands in Yorkshire.

In a survey of 1650, Buckland with Laverton is listed as having 51 families, the 10th largest of the 28 settlements in Kiftsgate Hundred. The manor house, now Buckland Manor Hotel, dates back to this period, the earliest parts of it dating to the 17th century, which fits well with the time James Thynne was lord of the manor (see below). Apart from the Church and rectory, at least two other houses in the village date to this period, Honeysuckle Cottage and Woodbine Cottage, both grade II listed. Outlying settlements within the parish also have ancient buildings. Laverton has 8 listed buildings, and there is a 17th-century farmhouse at Leasow House, near Laverton and one dating to 1720 in Little Buckland.

== Lords of the Manor ==
=== The Greshams ===
Sir Richard Gresham (1494–1549) was a successful merchant who in 1537 was elected Lord Mayor of London. He served as a commissioner under Henry VIII. Three years after being granted the manor of Buckland, one of his many properties, he died, and the estates passed to his son Sir Thomas Gresham. Thomas was even better than his father at accumulating wealth and land, serving as a financier and royal agent in turn to Edward VI, Mary I and Elizabeth I. Although he was lord of the manor for 30 years, there is, however no evidence that he lived at Buckland, or even visited it. Amongst his many achievements, he founded the Royal Exchange. His only son died unmarried in 1566, so when Thomas died in 1579, his bequests included a generous provision for his foundation, Gresham College, London's first institution of higher learning. The manor of Buckland, however, passed to the eldest son of his sister, Christian.

=== The Thynnes ===
Christian Gresham married Sir John Thynne in 1549, just before her father died. John Thynne was steward to the Duke of Somerset, and even before this advantageous marriage was gaining preferments and amassing a considerable fortune. Christian died before 1566, leaving nine children, and Sir John married again. He had by this time acquired a vast estate at Longleat and began the long task of building his mansion. His eldest son, also John, received his maternal inheritance, including Buckland, in 1579 on the death of Christian's father, but within a year his own father died, and he was master of Longleat. His son Thomas inherited the Longleat and Gloucestershire estates when the younger Sir John died in 1604.

Tangible evidence of the Thynnes at Buckland occurs over a hundred years later. Thomas's third son, Henry Frederick, had three sons, the second of whom, James Thynne of Buckland, had become the lord of the manor, and appears to have been resident in the village. He is credited with renewing the wainscotting, pews and pulpit in the Church. He died unmarried, aged 66, in 1709, and a memorial in St Michael's Church records how he left his 'large personal estate to pious uses', and his lands to his nephew, Thomas Thynne. Thomas, as the third son of a third son, would have had few expectations of inheritance. However, his uncle (the 1st Viscount Weymouth, James' elder brother) had inherited Longleat when another Thomas Thynne was assassinated in Pall Mall in 1682, and when Henry, the heir, died without sons in 1708, Thomas, who erected the Buckland monument, had become heir to the entire Longleat estate. He died a year after James, in 1710, a month before his son was born. The baby Thomas became heir to Longleat, and became 2nd Viscount Weymouth, inheriting the Longleat estates aged just 4, when his great uncle, the 1st Viscount, died. The manor of Buckland was thus re-united with the Longleat estates, and Thomas's son, the 3rd Viscount, was made 1st Marquis of Bath in 1789.

In 1715 Bernard Granville, a maternal cousin of the Thynne family and father of Mary Delany retired to the manor from London and is buried in a Grade II listed tomb in the churchyard.

Family tree summary for the Thynnes of Longleat from about 1500

Ralph Botevile
Thomas Thynne | William Thynne d. 1546
John Thynne of Longleat c. 1515–1580 | Francis Thynne c. 1544–1608
John Thynne of Longleat; 1555–1604 | Charles Thynne c. 1568–1652
Thomas Thynne of Longleat c. 1578–1639
Baronet of Caus Castle, of Kempsford in the County of Gloucester, 1641
James of Longleat; 1605–1670 | Thomas of Richmond d. 1669 | Henry Frederick Thynne; 1615–1680; 1st Baronet of Kempsford
Baron Thynne, 1680; Viscount Weymouth, 1682
Thomas of Longleat, 1648–1682 | Thomas Thynne; 1640–1714 inherited Longleat, 1682; 1st Viscount Weymouth and Baron Thynne, 2nd Baronet of Kempsford | James Thynne of Buckland d. 1709 | Henry Thynne Frederick d. 1705
unmarried
Henry Thynne; 1675–1708 | Thomas Thynne d. 1710
two daughters but no sons
Thomas Thynne; 1710–1751; 2nd Viscount Weymouth and Baron Thynne, 3rd Baronet of Kempsford
Marquess of Bath, 1789 | Baron Carteret (2nd creation), 1784
Thomas Thynne; 1734–1796; 1st Marquess of Bath, 3rd Viscount Weymouth and Baron Thynne, 4th Baronet of Kempsford | Henry Carteret; 1735–1826; 1st Baron Carteret
Thomas Thynne; 1765–1837; 2nd Marquess of Bath, 4th Viscount Weymouth and Baron Thynne, 5th Baronet of Kempsford | George Thynne; 1770–1838; 2nd Baron Carteret | John Thynne; 1772–1849; 3rd Baron Carteret
Baron Carteret extinct, 1849
Henry Thynne 1797–1837; 3rd Marquess of Bath, 5th Viscount Weymouth and Baron Thynne, 6th Baronet of Kempsford | Edward Thynne; 1807–1884 | Lady Charlotte Anne Thynne; 1811–1895 marr.: Walter Montagu Douglas Scott, Duke of Buccleuch and had issue.
John Thynne; 1831–1896; 4th Marquess of Bath, 6th Viscount Weymouth and Baron Thynne, 7th Baronet of Kempsford | Henry Thynne; 1832–1904
Thomas Thynne; 1862–1946; 5th Marquess of Bath, 7th Viscount Weymouth and Baron Thynne, 8th Baronet of Kempsford | Ulric Oliver Thynne; 1871–1957
Henry Thynne; 1905–1992; 6th Marquess of Bath, 8th Viscount Weymouth and Baron Thynne, 9th Baronet of Kempsford
Thomas Timothy Thynne; 1929–1930 | Alexander George Thynn; 1930–2020; 7th Marquess of Bath, 9th Viscount Weymouth and Baron Thynne, 10th Baronet of Kempsford | Christopher John Thynne; 1934–2017 | Valentine Charles Thynne; 1937–1979
Ceawlin Thynn b. 1974; 8th Marquess of Bath, 10th Viscount Weymouth and Baron Thynne, 11th Baronet of Kempsford | Lucien Henry Valentine Thynne b. 1965
John Alexander Ladi Thynn b. 2014 styled Viscount Weymouth

=== The Phillippses ===
In the 1790s, the 1st or 2nd Marquess sold Buckland Manor to Thomas Phillipps, a local magistrate and landowner, who acquired several local estates around Broadway, including Middle Hill and Child's Wickham. Phillipps died in 1818, and the property all passed to his son, also Thomas Phillipps, who had embarked on a lifetime of collecting documents and manuscripts on a huge scale. He accumulated some 60,000 manuscripts, a great many of which he worked on, indexed, transcribed, and in many cases published, printing his books and leaflets from his printing press in Broadway Tower, Middle Hill. In addition to acquiring documents, Phillipps was meticulous in keeping his own estate records. Harrison Horblit, an American with a similar enthusiasm for documents, acquired many of the Phillipps documents, and these, including many Buckland estate records, are now in the library of the Grolier Club of New York. When Thomas jnr died in 1872, the terms of his father's will ensured the inherited properties were passed on to his eldest daughter, Henrietta. She had eloped to marry James Orchard Halliwell, a Shakespeare scholar who met her whilst studying her father's manuscripts. Thomas refused his consent and cut off all communication following the elopement. But it was still Henrietta and Halliwell (who later changed his name to Halliwell-Phillipps) who became the next masters of Buckland Manor.

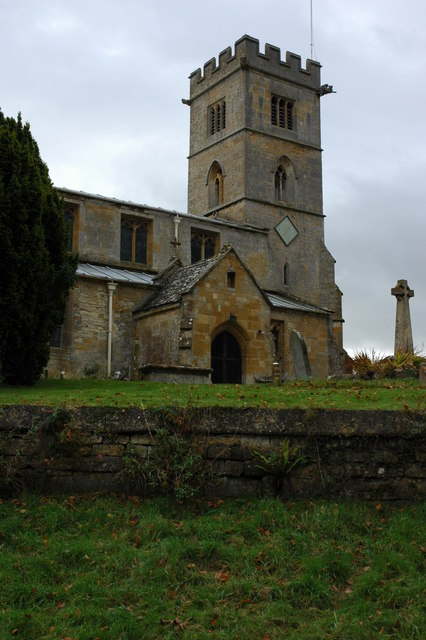
St Michael's church, Buckland

For many years, the village church, St Michael's, housed a sixteenth-century copy of The Acts and Monuments (popularly known as Foxe's Book of Martyrs). However, the book was stolen in January 2012.
