= List of Grade B+ listed buildings in County Down =

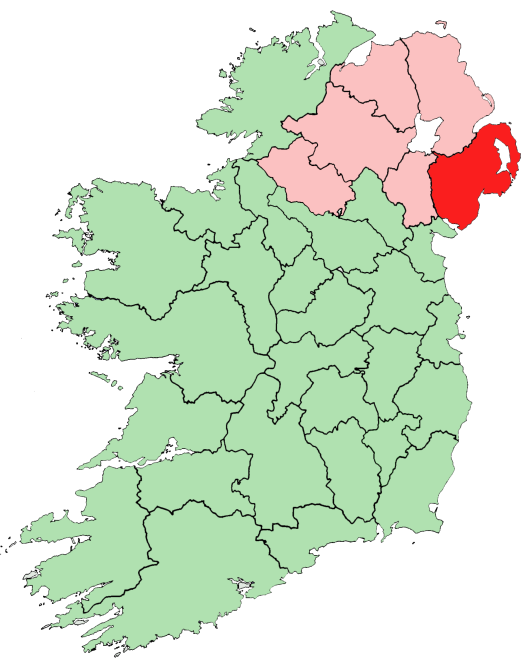
County Down within Ireland

This is a list of Grade B+ listed buildings in County Down, Northern Ireland.

In Northern Ireland, the term listed building refers to a building or other structure officially designated as being of "special architectural or historic interest". Grade B+ structures are those considered to be "buildings which might have merited grade A status but for detracting features such as an incomplete design, lower quality additions or alterations. Also included are buildings that because of exceptional features, interiors or environmental qualities are clearly above the general standard set by grade B buildings. A building may merit listing as grade B+ where its historic importance is greater than a similar building listed as grade B."

Listing began later in Northern Ireland than in the rest of the UK; the first provision for listing was contained in the Planning (Northern Ireland) Order 1972, and the current legislative basis for listing is the Planning (Northern Ireland) Order 1991. Under Article 42 of the Order, the Department of the Environment of the Northern Ireland Executive is required to compile lists of buildings of "special architectural or historic interest". The responsibility for the listing process rests with the Northern Ireland Environment Agency (NIEA), an executive agency within the Department of the Environment.

Following the introduction of listing, an initial survey of Northern Ireland's building stock was begun in 1974. By the time of the completion of this First Survey in 1994, the listing process had developed considerably, and it was therefore decided to embark upon a Second Survey to update and cross-check the original information. As of April 2010, the Second Survey had been completed for 147 of Northern Ireland's 547 council wards, and completion is anticipated by 2016. Information gathered during this survey, relating to both listed and unlisted buildings, is entered into the publicly accessible Northern Ireland Buildings Database. A range of listing criteria, which aim to define architectural and historic interest, have been developed by the NIEA, and are used to determine whether or not to list a building.

Once listed, severe restrictions are imposed on the modifications allowed to a building's structure or its fittings. Listed building consent must be obtained from local authorities prior to any alteration to such a structure. There are approximately 8,500 listed buildings in Northern Ireland, representing 2% of the total building stock. Of these, around 580 are listed at Grade B+.

County Down covers 2,448 square kilometres (945 sq mi), and has a population of around 516,000. The County has 164 Grade B+ listed buildings.

== Listed buildings ==
Building address	Grid Ref. (Note: Sometimes known as OSGB36, the grid reference is based on the British national grid reference system used by the Ordnance Survey.) Geo-coordinates	Type (Note: The type of structure, as identified by the DfC.)	Local authority	Second Survey	Original Survey	HB Number (Note: The "HB Number" is a unique number assigned to each listed building by the DfC.)	Image
South Rock Dwellings off Newcastle Road, Newcastle, Portaferry, Co Down BT22 1QQ		House - Terrace	Ards	B+	B	HB24/01/097	Upload Photo
Farm Buildings, Portaferry House Demesne, Ballymurphy, Portaferry, Co Down		Estate Related Structures	Ards	B+	B	HB24/01/106	Upload Photo
Portaferry House, Ballymurphy, Portaferry, Newtownards, Co Down, BT22 1PP		Country House	Ards	B+	B+	HB24/01/105	Upload Photo
The Market House, The Square, Portaferry, Co Down, BT22 1LN		Hall	Ards	B+	B1	HB24/01/001	Upload another image See more images
15 The Square, Portaferry, Co Down, BT22 1LW		House	Ards	B+	B1	HB24/01/003	Upload Photo
Holy Trinity C of I Church, Main Street, Kircubbin, Newtownards, Co Down, BT22 2SR		Church	Ards	B+	B+	HB24/02/009	Upload another image
R.C. Church Lisbane, Rowreagh Road, Lisbane, Kircubbin, Newtownards, Co Down, BT22 1AR		Church	Ards	B+	B+	HB24/02/038	Upload another image
Non-subscribing Presbyterian Church, Ballyhemlin Road, Ballyhemlin (near Kircubbin), Newtownards, Co Down, BT22 2QY		Church	Ards	B+	B+	HB24/03/019	Upload another image
Balligan Church of St. Andrew (C of I), Balligan, Newtownards, Co Down, ?BT22 2RA		Church	Ards	B+	B+	HB24/03/020	Upload another image
St. Saviour’s C of I Parish Church, Church Street, Greyabbey, Newtownards, Co. Down, BT22 2NQ		Church	Ards	B+	B	HB24/04/020	Upload another image
Stableyard, Ballywalter Park, Springvale, Ballywalter, Newtownards, Co. Down, BT22 2PP		Stables	Ards	B+	B	HB24/04/029	Upload Photo
Holy Trinity (C of I) Church, Whitechurch Road, Whitechurch, Ballywalter, Newtownards, Co. Down, BT22 2JY		Church	Ards	B+	B	HB24/04/042	Upload another image See more images
186 Whitechurch Road, Ballyferis, Ballywalter, Newtownards, Co. Down, BT22 2JZ		House	Ards	B+	B1	HB24/04/045	Upload Photo
Carrowdore Castle, Abbey Road Ballyrawer (near Carrowdore), Millisle, Newtownards, Co Down, BT22 2JH		Country House	Ards	B+	B+	HB24/05/001	Upload Photo
Christ Church (C of I), Woburn Road, Ballyrawer, Millisle, Newtownards, County Down, BT22 2HY		Church	Ards	B+	B+	HB24/05/004	Upload another image See more images
Donaghadee (C of I) parish church, Church Place, Donaghadee, County Down, BT21 0DB		Church	Ards	B+	B	HB24/06/001	Upload another image See more images
Mew Island Lighthouse lighthouse complex Mew Island (off coast of Donaghadee) County Down		Lighthouse	Ards	B+		HB24/06/034	Upload another image See more images
The Harbour, Donaghadee, County Down		Harbour/ Pier	Ards	B+	B	HB24/07/022	Upload another image
Rosebank, 8 Millisle Road, Donaghadee, County Down		House	Ards	B+	B	HB24/07/026	Upload Photo
Former Town Hall, 24 High Street, Donaghadee, County Down		Office	Ards	B+	B1	HB24/07/004	Upload Photo
28 The Parade, Donaghadee, County Down		House	Ards	B+	B1	HB24/07/019	Upload Photo
Ballyvester House, 84 Ballyvester Road, Ballyvester, Donaghadee, County Down		House	Ards	B+	B1	HB24/07/044	Upload Photo
Prospect House, 4 Millisle Road, Donaghadee, County Down		House	Ards	B+	B2	HB24/07/025	Upload Photo
Newtownards Model Primary School, Scrabo Road, Newtownards, County Down, BT23 4NW		School	Ards	B+	B	HB24/11/012	Upload Photo
Scrabo Tower (Londonderry Monument), Scrabo Hill, Scrabo, Newtownards, County Down, BT23		Tower	Ards	B+	B+	HB24/11/031	Upload another image See more images
Milecross House, 49 Belfast Road, Milecross, Newtownards, County Down, BT23 4TR		House	Ards	B+	B1	HB24/11/041	Upload Photo
Town Hall, Conway Square, Newtownards, County Down		Town Hall	Ards		B+	HB24/13/001	Upload another image See more images
Comber Non-subscribing Presbyterian, Church Mill Street, Comber, County Down		Church	Ards	B+	B+	HB24/15/034 A	Upload another image
Ard View, 31 Ardview Road, Killinchy (near Killinchy village), Newtownards, County Down, BT23 6TG		House	Ards	B+	B	HB24/17/007	Upload Photo
Killinchy Presbyterian Church, Craigarusky Road, Balloo, Killinchy, Newtownards, County Down BT23 6PQ		Church	Ards	B+	B	HB24/17/020	Upload another image
35 Thorny Hill Road, Ballymacreelly, Killinchy, Newtownards, County Down, BT23 6ST		House	Ards	B+	B+	HB24/17/014	Upload Photo
Florida Manor, 14 Florida Road, Kilmood, Killinchy, Newtownards, County Down, BT23 6RU		Country House	Ards	B+	B+	HB24/17/032	Upload Photo
St. Mary’s C of I Hall, Kilmood Church Road, Kilmood, Killinchy, Newtownards, County Down		Hall	Ards	B+	B1	HB24/17/037	Upload Photo
White Bridge, Stramore Road, Moyallon/Loughans Gilford, County Down		Bridge	Banbridge		B+	HB17/01/036	Upload another image
Banford House, 56 Banbridge Road, Gilford, Craigavon, County Down, BT63 6DJ		House	Banbridge	B+	B+	HB17/02/018	Upload Photo
Milltown House, 136 Lurgan Road, Lenaderg, Banbridge, County Down, BT32 4NL		House	Banbridge	B+	B1	HB17/02/001	Upload Photo
Seapatrick Parish Church, Church Square, Banbridge, County Down (AKA Holy Trinity Church)		Church	Banbridge		B+	HB17/04/001	Upload another image
Downshire Bridge (and the cut), Banbridge, County Down		Bridge	Banbridge		B+	HB17/06/010	Upload another image
Non-Subscribing Church, Downshire Road, Banbridge, County Down		Church	Banbridge		B+	HB17/06/003	Upload Photo
Downshire Arms Hotel, Newry Street, Banbridge, County Down		Hotel	Banbridge		B+	HB17/06/015	Upload another image
The Lodge, Old Newry Road, Ballyvally, Banbridge, County Down		House	Banbridge		B+	HB17/06/019	Upload Photo
Crozier House, 15 Church Square, Banbridge, County Down (AKA Avonmore House)		House	Banbridge		B+	HB17/07/009	Upload another image
Crozier Monument, Church Square, Banbridge, County Down		Memorial	Banbridge		B+	HB17/07/011	Upload another image
25 Sentry Box Road, Ballynafoy, Banbridge, County Down		House	Banbridge		B+	HB17/08/031	Upload Photo
Ballyward Lodge, Ballyward, Castlewellan, County Down		House	Banbridge		B+	HB17/10/007	Upload Photo
First Dromara Presbyterian Church, Ardtanagh, Dromore, County Down		Church	Banbridge		B+	HB17/11/010	Upload another image
Balleevy House, 11 Balleevy Road, Banbridge, County Down		House	Banbridge		B+	HB17/12/002	Upload Photo
Gillhall (Gill Hall) Bridge, Dromore, County Down		Bridge	Banbridge	B+		HB17/13/030	Upload Photo
First Presbyterian Church, (Non Subscribing) Rampart Street, Dromore, County Down		Church	Banbridge		B+	HB17/15/020	Upload another image
Cleland Mausoleum, St. Elizabeth Parish Church of Ireland, Church Green, Dundonald, County Down		Mausoleum	Castlereagh	B+	A	HB25/05/002	Upload another image
Waddell-Cunningham-Douglas Monument, Knockbreda Churchyard, Church Road, Knockbreda, Belfast		Mausoleum	Castlereagh		B+	HB25/16/005 B	Upload Photo
Rainey-Goddard Monument, Knockbreda Churchyard, Church Road, Knockbreda, Belfast		Mausoleum	Castlereagh		B+	HB25/16/005 C	Upload Photo
Greg Monument, Knockbreda Churchyard, Church Road, Knockbreda, Belfast		Mausoleum	Castlereagh		B+	HB25/16/005 D	Upload Photo
Ringdufferin House, 35 Ringdufferin Road, Ringdufferin, Killyleagh, County Down, BT30 9PH		Country House	Down	B+	B	HB18/02/019 A	Upload Photo
Kilmore Presbyterian Church, Drumaghlis Road, Drumaghlis, Ballynahinch, County Down		Church	Down	B+	B	HB18/05/014	Upload another image
The Corn Mill, Mary Brook, 11 Raleagh Road, Drummaconagher, Crossgar, Downpatrick, County Down, BT30 9JG		Mill	Down	B+		HB18/05/001 B	Upload Photo
The Flax Mill, Mary Brook, 11 Raleagh Road, Drummaconagher, Crossgar, Downpatrick, County Down, BT30 9JG		Mill	Down	B+		HB18/05/001 C	Upload Photo
The Stable, Mary Brook, 11 Raleagh Road, Drummaconagher, Crossgar, Downpatrick, County Down, BT30 9JG		Stables	Down	B+		HB18/05/001 D	Upload Photo
Montalto House, Dromore Road, Ballymaglave north, Ballynahinch, County Down, BT24 8PX		Country House	Down	B+	B+	HB18/06/001	Upload Photo
Echohall, 62 Spa Road, Spa, Ballymaglave south, Ballynahinch, County Down, BT24 8PT		House	Down	B+	B1	HB18/06/018	Upload Photo
Old Court (C of I) Chapel, Old Court, Strangford, County Down		Church	Down	B+	B+	HB18/08/041	Upload Photo
Strangford House, Castle Street, Strangford, Downpatrick, County Down		House	Down		B+	HB18/08/001	Upload Photo
Saw Mill, Castleward House, Castleward, Strangford, Downpatrick, County Down		Mill	Down		B+	HB18/08/071	Upload Photo
Flour or Corn Mill, Castleward House, Castleward, Strangford, Downpatrick, County Down		Mill	Down		B+	HB18/08/073	Upload Photo
Christ Church, Drumroe Road, Ballyculter, Upper Strangford, Downpatrick, County Down		Church	Down		B+	HB18/08/102	Upload another image See more images
St. Patrick's Memorial C Of I Church, Saul, Strangford, Downpatrick, County Down		Church	Down		B+	HB18/08/130	Upload another image See more images
Tyrella House, Tyrella, South Killough, Downpatrick, County Down		Country House	Down		B+	HB18/10/074	Upload Photo
Slidderyford Bridge (The Twelve Arches), Old Ballynahinch Road, Wateresk, Dundrum, Newcastle, County Down		Bridge	Down		B+	HB18/11/039	Upload another image See more images
Mount Panther, Cloghram, Dundrum, Newcastle, County Down		Country House	Down		B+	HB18/11/048	Upload another image See more images
Walled Garden, The Castle, Castlewellan, County Down		Walled Garden Structure	Down	B+		HB18/12/027	Upload Photo
Castlewellan Castle, Castlewellan, County Down		Country House	Down		B+	HB18/12/001	Upload another image See more images
Wood Lodge, Clarkill, Castlewellan, County Down		House	Down		B+	HB18/12/002	Upload Photo
Kilcoo C of I Parish Church, Bryansford Village, Ballyhafry, Newcastle, County Down, BT33 0PT		Church	Down	B+	B	HB18/13/013	Upload another image
Clanbrassil Barn and Gateway, Tollymore Park, Newcastle, County Down		Estate Related Structures	Down	B+	B+	HB18/13/023	Upload another image See more images
Barbican gate, Tollymore Park, Newcastle, County Down		Gates/ Screens/ Lodges	Down	B+	B+	HB18/13/037	Upload another image
Seaforde House, Seaforde, Downpatrick, County Down		Country House	Down	B+	A	HB18/17/003	Upload Photo
Seaforde gate lodge, 181 Newcastle Road, Seaforde Demesne near Seaforde, Downpatrick, County Down, BT24 8PL		Gates/ Screens/ Lodges	Down	B+	B	HB18/17/002 A	Upload Photo
The Kennels, 10 Drumgooland Road, Seaforde Demesne, Downpatrick, County Down, BT30 8NT		Kennels	Down	B+	B	HB18/17/024	Upload Photo
Ballykilbeg House, 22 Ballykilbeg Road, Ballykilbeg, Downpatrick, County Down, BT30 8HL		House	Down	B+	B	HB18/17/036	Upload Photo
Clough Non-Subscribing Presbyterian Church, Castlewellan Road, Clough, Downpatrick, County Down, BT30 8RD		Church	Down	B+	B	HB18/17/051	Upload another image See more images
Murland Tomb, Clough, Non-subscribing Presbyterian Church, Castlewellan Road, Clough, Downpatrick, County Down		Mausoleum	Down	B+	B	HB18/17/052	Upload another image See more images
Loughinisland C of I parish church, Newcastle Road, Seaforde, Naghan, Downpatrick, County Down BT30 8PL		Church	Down	B+	B+	HB18/17/001	Upload Photo
Seaforde gate, 181 Newcastle Road, Seaforde Demesne near Seaforde, Downpatrick, County Down		Gates/ Screens/ Lodges	Down	B+	B+	HB18/17/002 B	Upload Photo
Finnebrogue House, off Finnebrogue Road, Finnabrogue, Downpatrick, County Down, BT30 9AA		Country House	Down	B+	B1	HB18/18/001 A	Upload Photo
Gatehouse, New County Gaol, Downpatrick, County Down		Gates/ Screens/ Lodges	Down		B+	HB18/18/006	Upload another image
Parish Church Of The Holy Trinity (St. Margaret's), Church Street, Downpatrick, County Down		Church	Down		B+	HB18/18/007	Upload another image See more images
Percival-Maxwell Tomb, Inch Parish Churchyard, Inch, Downpatrick, County Down		Mausoleum	Down		B+	HB18/18/034	Upload another image
Marlborough House, 64 Killough Road, Ballymote middle, Downpatrick, County Down, BT30 8BL		House	Down	B+	B1	HB18/19/027	Upload Photo
Ballydugan House, Ballydugan, Downpatrick, County Down		House	Down		B+	HB18/20/046	Upload Photo
Court House, English St. Downpatrick Co.Down		COURT HOUSE	Down		B+	HB18/20/002	Upload another image See more images
25 English Street, Downpatrick		House	Down		B+	HB18/20/006 A	Upload another image
27 English Street, Downpatrick		House	Down		B+	HB18/20/006 B	Upload another image
County Rooms, English St., Downpatrick		House	Down		B+	HB18/20/009	Upload Photo
Glenganagh, 39 Bangor Road, Groomsport, Co Down BT19 6JF		House	North Down	B+	B	HB23/01/001 A	Upload Photo
Royal Ulster Yacht Club, 101 Clifton Road, Bangor, Co Down BT20 5HY		Recreational Club	North Down	B+	B1	HB23/03/009	Upload another image
Bangor War Memorial, Ward Park, Bangor, Co Down		Memorial	North Down	B+	B2	HB23/05/005	Upload Photo
Local Heritage and Visitor's Centre, Bangor Castle, Castle Park Avenue, Bangor, Co Down BT20 4BN		Recreational Club	North Down	B+	A	HB23/07/001 B	Upload Photo
Bangor Abbey Parish C of I, Newtownards Road, Bangor, Co Down BT20 4BW		Church	North Down	B+	A	HB23/07/004 A	Upload another image
First Presbyterian Church, 100 Main Street, Bangor, Co Down BT20 4AG		Church	North Down	B+	B+	HB23/07/006	Upload another image See more images
St Comgall's Parish C. of I., Hamilton Road, Bangor, Co Down BT20 4LE		Church	North Down	B+	B+	HB23/07/007 A	Upload another image See more images
Clandeboye House, Clandeboye Estate, Ballyleidy, Bangor, Co Down BT19 1RN		Country House	North Down	B+	B+	HB23/10/002	Upload another image
Private Chapel, Clandeboye Estate, Bangor, County Down BT19 1RN		Church	North Down	B+	B+	HB23/10/002 D	Upload Photo
Private Chapel, Clandeboye House, Clandeboye, Bangor		Church	North Down		B+	HB23/10/005	Upload Photo
Seacourt 5 & 6, Seacourt Maxwell Drive, Maxwell Road, Bangor, Co Down BT20 3LE		House	North Down	B+	B+	HB23/14/005 A	Upload Photo
Railway Bridge, Crawfordsburn Country Park, Crawfordsburn, Bangor Co Down		Bridge	North Down	B+		HB23/15/030	Upload Photo
Ardnalea House, 69 Station Road, Craigavad, Bangor, Co. Down BT19 1EZ		House	North Down	B+	B	HB23/16/006 A	Upload Photo
Ardnalea House Apartments 1-3, 71-73 Station Road, Craigavad, Bangor, County Down BT19 1EZ		House	North Down	B+	B	HB23/16/006 B	Upload Photo
The Royal Belfast Golf Club, Station Road, Holywood, Co. Down BT18 0BP		Recreational Club	North Down	B+	B1	HB23/16/001 A	Upload Photo
Lorne, 30 Station Road, Craigavad, Holywood, Co Down BT18 0BP		Recreational Club	North Down	B+	B1	HB23/16/002 A	Upload Photo
The Hill, 169 Bangor Road, Holywood, Co. Down BT18 0ET		House	North Down	B+	B+	HB23/18/052	Upload Photo
Glenmakieran, 141 Bangor Road, Cultra, Holywood		House	North Down	B+		HB23/18/058	Upload Photo
Cultra House, 21 Cultra Avenue, Holywood		House	North Down		B+	HB23/18/024	Upload Photo
Holywood Parish C. of I., 71 Church Road, Holywood, Co Down BT18 9BX		Church	North Down	B+	B	HB23/20/039 A	Upload another image See more images
Moira Railway Station, Station Road, Moira		Railway Station	Lisburn		B+	HB19/03/049	Upload another image See more images
Trevor House, 9 The Square, Hillsborough, Co. Down BT26 6AG		Office	Lisburn	B+	B	HB19/05/038 B	Upload another image
8 The Square, Hillsborough, County Down BT26 6AG		House	Lisburn	B+	B1	HB19/05/038 A	Upload another image
54 Grove Road, Backnamullagh, Dromore, County Down BT25 1QX		Outbuildings	Lisburn	B+		HB19/05/154	Upload Photo
Hill House, 35 Main St., Hillsborough		House	Lisburn		B+	HB19/05/029	Upload another image
Hillsborough Castle, Hillsborough		Country House	Lisburn		B+	HB19/05/076	Upload another image See more images
Summer House, Hillsborough Castle, Small Park, Hillsborough		Summerhouse	Lisburn		B+	HB19/05/078	Upload Photo
The Lady Alice Temple, Hillsborough Castle, Small Park, Hillsborough		Estate Related Structures	Lisburn		B+	HB19/05/079	Upload another image
Union Lodge, 8 Carricknaveagh Road, Boardmills, Lisburn, County Down BT27 6UB		House	Lisburn	B+		HB19/06/033	Upload Photo
Hillhall Presbyterian Church, 163 Hillhall Road, Lisburn BT27 5JA		Church	Lisburn	B+	B+	HB19/09/027	Upload another image
Berwick Hall, Hillsborough Road, Aughnadrumman, Craigavon, Co. Down BT67 0HG		House	Lisburn	B+	A	HB19/22/003	Upload another image
St. Patricks C. of I., 260 Upper Malone Road, Dunmurry, Belfast, County Down BT17 9LD		Church	Lisburn	B+	B	HB19/23/001 A	Upload another image
Holy Trinity C. of I., Ballylesson Road, Belfast, County Down BT8 8JU		Church	Lisburn	B+	B	HB19/23/033	Upload another image See more images
Administration and drawing office block (Harland & Wolff), Queens Road, Belfast BT3 9DV		Office	Belfast	B+		HB26/07/009	Upload Photo
Sydenham Primary School, Strandburn Street, Belfast, Co Down BT4 1LX		School	Belfast	B+	B1	HB26/09/007	Upload Photo
Holy Trinity Church, Magherana, Waringstown, Craigavon		Church	Craigavon		B+	HB14/06/002	Upload Photo
Waringstown Presbyterian Church, Mill Hill, Waringstown, Craigavon		Church	Craigavon		B+	HB14/06/016	Upload another image
Annalong Corn Mill, The Harbour, Annalong, Newry, Co Down BT34 4AS		Mill	Newry and Mourne	B+	B+	HB16/01/011	Upload another image See more images
Main Entrance to Silent Valley Mourne Scheme, Head Road, Annalong, Newry Co Down BT34 4PU		Gates/ Screens/ Lodges	Newry and Mourne	B+	B1	HB16/02/016	Upload Photo
Overflow pipe Silent Valley Reservoir, Head Road, Kilkeel, Newry Co Down BT34 4PU		Water Works Structures	Newry and Mourne	B+	B1	HB16/02/023	Upload another image
Ben Crom Reservoir, Silent Valley, Head Road, Ballymartin, Newry Co Down BT34 4PU		Water Works Structures	Newry and Mourne	B+	B1	HB16/02/028	Upload another image
Haulbowline Lighthouse, Greencastle, Newry, Co Down BT34		Light House/ Navigation Mark	Newry and Mourne	B+		HB16/04/009	Upload another image See more images
Mourne Park House, Newry Road, Kilkeel, Newry, Co Down BT34 4SD		Country House	Newry and Mourne	B+	B1	HB16/05/009 A	Upload Photo
Kilbroney House, Kilbroney Road, Rostrevor		House	Newry and Mourne		B+	HB16/06/011	Upload another image
Cabra House, 10 Cabra Road, Rathfriland, Co Down BT34 5EW		Country House	Newry and Mourne	B+	B1	HB16/07/031 A	Upload Photo
Templegowran House, 39 Hilltown Road, Newry, Co Down BT34 2HJ		Country House	Newry and Mourne	B+	B1	HB16/10/018	Upload Photo
Band Stand in the Town Park, Warrenpoint, Newry, Co Down BT34 3NZ		Band Stand	Newry and Mourne	B+	B	HB16/12/002	Upload another image
Clonallan Parish Church, Clonallan Road, Warrenpoint, Newry Co Down BT34 3QQ		Church	Newry and Mourne	B+	B	HB16/12/015	Upload another image
Non-subscribing Presbyterian Church, Burren Road, Warrenpoint, Newry Co Down BT34 3SA		Church	Newry and Mourne	B+	B+	HB16/12/001	Upload Photo
Moygannon House, Rostrevor Road, Warrenpoint, Newry, Co Down BT34 3RU		House	Newry and Mourne	B+	B1	HB16/12/011 A	Upload Photo
Former Donaghmore Methodist Church, Cargabane Road, Cargabane, Newry Co Down BT34 1SB		Church	Newry and Mourne	B+	B	HB16/14/011	Upload another image
Crown Bridge, Sheeptown Road, Donaghmore, Newry, Co Down BT34 2LD		Bridge	Newry and Mourne	B+	B+	HB16/14/034	Upload Photo
Chapel of St. Mary the Immaculate Mother of God, St Colman’s College, Violet Hill, 46 Armagh Road Newry, BT35 6PP		Church	Newry and Mourne	B+	B+	HB16/25/021	Upload Photo
1 Downshire Road (1 Sandy's Place), Newry, Co Down BT34 1ED		Office	Newry and Mourne	B+	B+	HB16/26/013 A	Upload Photo
3 Downshire Road (2 Sandy's Place), Newry, Co Down BT34 1ED		Office	Newry and Mourne	B+	B+	HB16/26/013 B	Upload Photo
5 Downshire Place, Newry, Co Down BT34 1DZ		Office - Terrace	Newry and Mourne	B+	B+	HB16/26/020 A	Upload Photo
7 Downshire Place, Newry, Co Down BT34 1DZ		Office - Terrace	Newry and Mourne	B+	B+	HB16/26/020 B	Upload Photo
9 Downshire Place, Newry, Co Down BT34 1DZ		Office - Terrace	Newry and Mourne	B+	B+	HB16/26/020 C	Upload Photo
Newry Baptist Church, 11 Downshire Place, Newry Co Down BT34 1DZ		Church	Newry and Mourne	B+	B+	HB16/26/020 D	Upload Photo
45 Downshire Road, Newry, Co Down BT34 1EE		Office - Terrace	Newry and Mourne	B+	B+	HB16/26/023 A	Upload another image
47 Downshire Road, Newry, Co Down BT34 1EE		Office - Terrace	Newry and Mourne	B+	B+	HB16/26/023 B	Upload another image
49 Downshire Road, Newry, Co Down BT34 1EE		Office - Terrace	Newry and Mourne	B+	B+	HB16/26/023 C	Upload another image
St Patrick's Church (C of I), Church Street, Newry Co Down BT34 2AH		Church	Newry and Mourne	B+	B+	HB16/28/001 A	Upload another image See more images
7 Trevor Hill, Newry, Co Down BT34 1DN		Office	Newry and Mourne	B+	B1	HB16/28/008 B	Upload Photo
Armagh-Down Bridge, Newry, Co Down BT34		Bridge	Newry and Mourne	B+	B1	HB16/28/018 A	Upload another image See more images
18 Castle Street, Newry, Co Down BT34 2BY		Office	Newry and Mourne	B+	B1	HB16/28/056 A	Upload Photo
St Catherine’s (RC) Church, Dominic Street, Newry Co Down		Church	Newry and Mourne	B+	B	HB16/29/001 A	Upload Photo
Church of the Sacred Heart (RC) Adj. to 134 Dublin Road, Newry Co Down		Church	Newry and Mourne	B+	B	HB16/29/017 A	Upload another image See more images
21 St. Colman’s Park, Newry, Co Down BT34 2BX		House	Newry and Mourne	B+	B1	HB16/30/005 A	Upload Photo
Fisher and Fisher Solicitors, 9 John Mitchel Place, Newry Co Down BT34 2BP		Office	Newry and Mourne	B+	B1	HB16/30/005 B	Upload Photo
Convent of Mercy, Home Avenue, Newry, Co Down BT34 2DL		Religious House	Newry and Mourne	B+	B1	HB16/30/014 A	Upload another image
First Non-Subscribing Presbyterian Church, John Mitchell Place, Newry Co Down BT34 2BP		Church	Newry and Mourne		B+	HB16/30/011	Upload Photo
