= Letitia Bushe =

18th century Irish artist

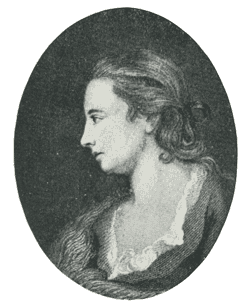
- Miniature of Bushe by Joseph Browne
- Born: c. 1705 – c. 1710; Dangan, County Kilkenny, Ireland
- Died: 17 November 1757 (aged 47/52); Dublin
- Resting place: St Andrew's church, Dublin
- Parent(s): Arthur and Mary Bushe

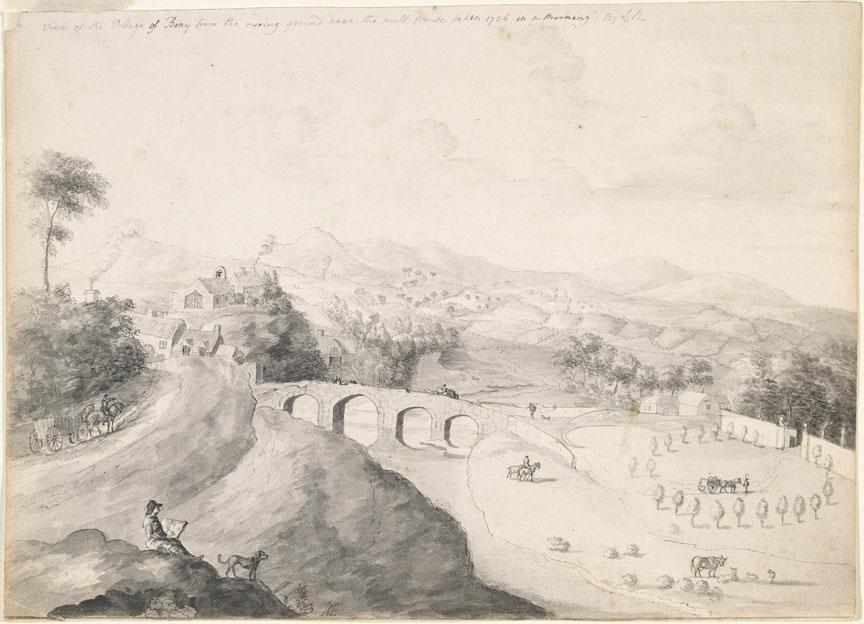
Bushe's View of the Village of Bray, County Wicklow

Letitia Bushe (c.1705/1710 – 17 November 1757) was an Irish watercolourist and miniaturist.

== Life ==
Letitia Bushe was born around 1705 or 1710 in Dangan, County Kilkenny. She was the daughter of Arthur Bushe, a secretary to the commissioners of revenue, and Mary (née Forth). Though Bushe is considered a talented artist there is no evidence of her receiving any training, though it is thought Bernard Lens or one of his sons may have given her lessons. She may have been largely self-taught as her style remained naive throughout her career. Bushe was continuously in demand as a lady's companion due to her conversational skills, which leading to her teach painting to many women and their children. She was a friend of Mary Delany, Jonathan Swift and Anne Donnellan. She had a six-year relationship with a younger woman Lady Anne Bligh, which some have speculated to have been a romantic one. When she was not acting as a companion she had rooms in Dawson Street. Bushe died on 17 November 1757 in those rooms. She was buried the following day in St Andrew's church, Dublin.

== Friendship with Mary Delany ==
Bushe was a friend of Mary Delany from 1731. She stayed with Delany on numerous occasions, and a miniature of Bushe by Joseph Browne is included in the 1861 Correspondence of Mrs Delany edited by Lady Llanover. Much of what is known about Bushe's life is from the letters between her and Delany. Details included that Bushe contracted smallpox which marred her good looks, and her poverty after her father's death is the reason she believed she did not receive any offers of marriage. Bush and Delany remained very good friends, with Delany referring to Bushe drawing landscapes, and cleaning painting at Delany's home Delville House. Bushe and Delany embarked on a number of artist projects together. Delany described Bushe as "a gay, good-humoured, innocent girl, without the least conceit of her beauty .... she paints delightfully" and Delany painted Bushe herself.

== Artistic work ==
One of Bushe's pieces which is in the National Gallery of Ireland, A view of Bray (1736), shows her skill as a topographical artist and her humour, as she includes herself in the painting with an accompanying dog. During a visit to England in 1743, she painted a View of London which is taken from Hampstead Heath, as well as views of Bath and Bristol. In Ireland, Bushe painted studies of country houses, including their gardens. She also made antiquarian drawings for Bishop Robert Clayton, a friend of Delany. Bushe’s drawing of the Templebryan stone circle has also been noted by scholars as an early example of artistic engagement with Irish antiquities.
