= Market House, Newtownards =

Municipal Building in Newtownards, Northern Ireland

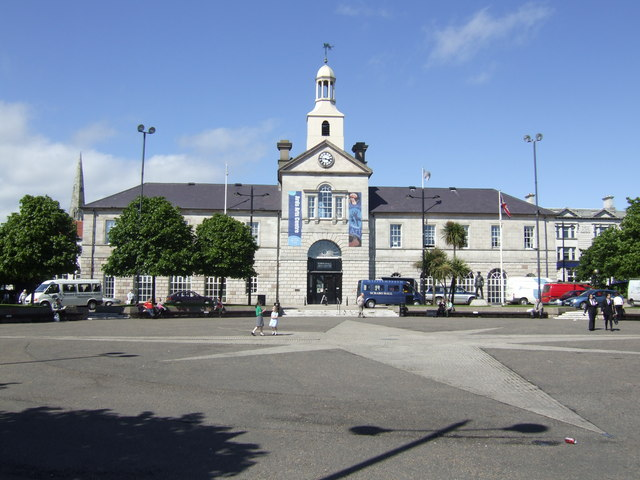
- Market House, Newtownards

- Shown in Northern Ireland
- 54°35′37″N 5°41′45″W
- Location: Newtownards

History
- Built: 1771

Site notes
- Architect: Ferdinando Stratford
- Architectural style: Grecian-Doric style

Listed Building – Grade B+
- Designated: 4 March 1977
- Reference no.: HB 24/13/001

Market House is a municipal building in Conway Square, Newtownards, County Down, Northern Ireland. It is a Grade B+ listed building.

== History ==
The building was commissioned by Robert Stewart, 1st Marquess of Londonderry to be the centre of the market town, a role previously undertaken by Newtownards Priory. It was designed by Ferdinando Stratford in a Grecian-Doric style and built of Scrabo stone between 1767 and 1771.

The design involved a asymmetrical frontage with eleven bays facing Conway Square; the central section, which projected forwards, featured a doorway with a fanlight on the ground floor, a Venetian window on the first floor and a pediment containing a clock above; the wings had arcading on the ground floor and narrow windows on the first floor. Markets were held in the open area on the ground floor: access was from Conway Square through a central archway which was fitted with gates that could be opened and closed at night. There was an assembly room on the first floor of the west wing and a drawing room, now known as the Londonderry Room, on the first floor of the east wing. A tower with a weathervane was added in 1778.

The market house was held for a week by United Irishmen rebels travelling to Saintfield during the Irish Rebellion of 1798 before government troops recovered control again in June 1798. The events of that conflict, including the action at Newtownards, were immortalised in the novel Betsy Gray by Wesley Guard Lyttle which was first published in 1887.

Charles Vane-Tempest-Stewart, 6th Marquess of Londonderry gifted the building to the town commissioners in September 1897 in anticipation of the formation of Newtownards Borough Council under the Local Government (Ireland) Act 1898. The arcading on the ground floor was replaced with round-headed windows, to allow the whole building to be used for municipal purposes, in 1903, and it remained in use as the headquarters of Newtownards Borough Council until the early 1970s.

Following the implementation of the Local Government Act (Northern Ireland) 1972, the newly designated Ards Borough Council established itself in new council offices in Church Street. The town hall then went through a period of underuse and decline before being refaced with new stonework in 1990 and refurbished internally in 1998. It was then re-opened by the mayor, Alan McDowell, as an arts centre on 24 February 2000.

== See also ==
- List of Grade B+ listed buildings in County Down
