= Laverton, Gloucestershire =

Village in Gloucestershire, England

Coordinates: 52.0192°N 1.8941°W

Laverton
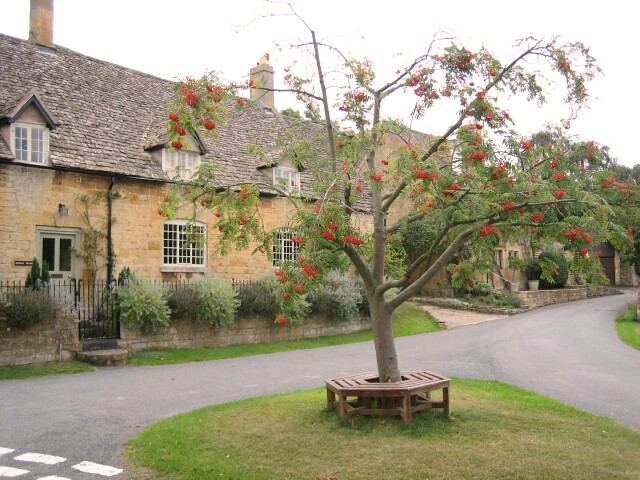
- The centre of Laverton, Gloucestershire

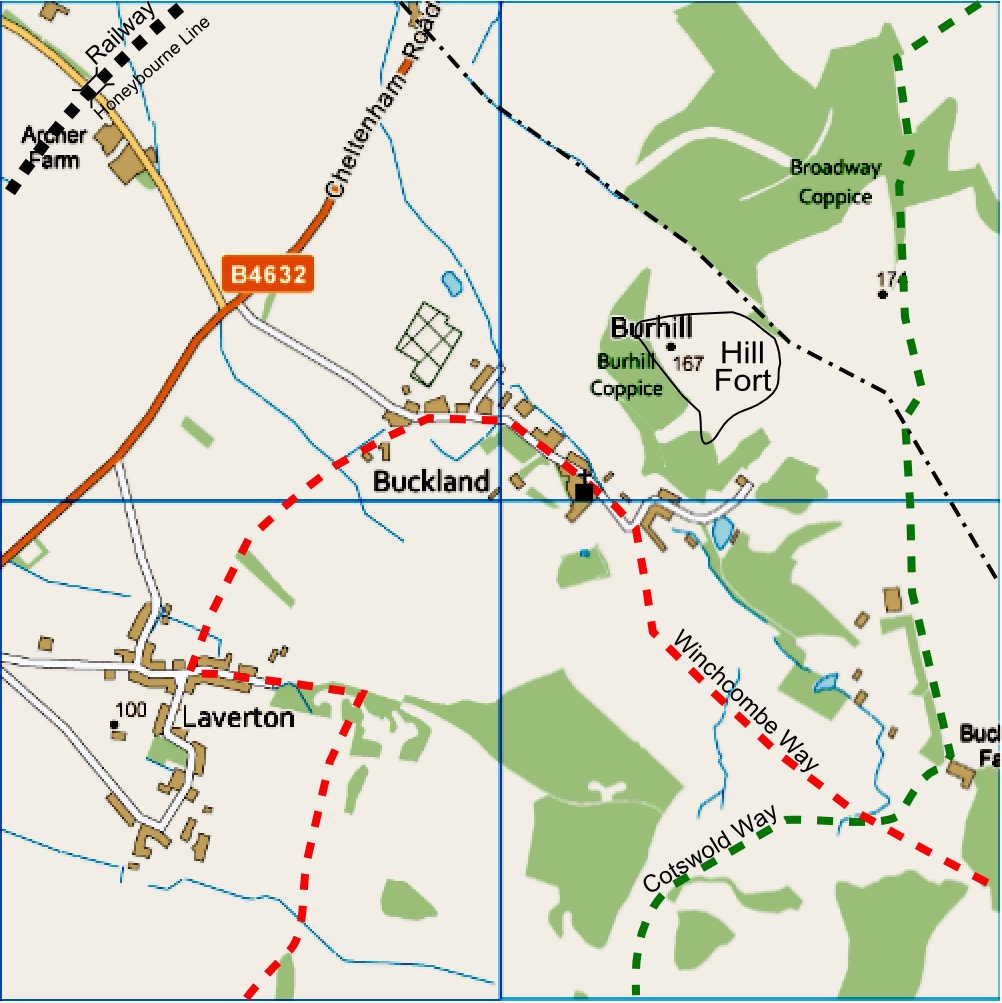
- Map of Laverton and Buckland

- Location within Gloucestershire
- Population: 224 (including Buckland) 2010 estimate
- OS grid reference: SP073356
  - London: 83 mi (134 km)
- Civil parish: Buckland
- District: Tewkesbury
- Shire county: Gloucestershire
- Region: South West
- Country: England
- Sovereign state: United Kingdom
- Post town: Broadway
- Postcode district: WR12
- Police: Gloucestershire
- Fire: Gloucestershire
- Ambulance: South Western
- UK Parliament: Tewkesbury

Laverton is a village in Tewkesbury Borough in Gloucestershire, England. It lies less than a mile south of the village of Buckland, and is in the civil parish of Buckland. The cluster of cottages and farmhouses are built of local Cotswold stone, the oldest dating back at least to the 17th century. A long distance path crosses the village.

== Community ==
The village has a stone-built village hall, providing a 70-seat community building for the parish.

The Winchcombe Way long-distance path runs through the village. To the east of the village is Laverton Hill, formerly an area of limestone quarries. This is part of a Cotswold escarpment that runs from Broadway to Winchcombe, and is part of the Cotswold Way National Trail.

== Listed Buildings ==
There are eight listed buildings in Laverton.

Potters Farmhouse
17th-century stone farmhouse, with earlier traces. A two-room main wing, with a 3 room cross-wing and lean-to. Grade II, listed 1960.
Post Office and Trots Cottage
17th-century stone cottages with stone slate roofs. Grade II, listed 1960
K6 Telephone Kiosk
near Potter Farm. Archetypal 1935 design, painted red. Grade II, listed 2008.
Hill Farmhouse
late 17th or early 18th-century stone farmhouse three rooms wide. Grade II, listed 1960.
Hollytree Cottage
17th-century farmhouse, formerly called Laverton House Farm, built in squared stones alternating thick and thin courses, with a Welsh slate roof. Notable ashlar stone wall around the garden. Grade II, listed 1960.
Top Farm farmhouse and stable
A 17th-century stone farmhouse with stone slate roof. The nearby stable may date to the 15th century. It is built of stone, timber-frames and weatherboarding, and has a thatched roof. Both are grade II, listed 1987.

== Railway ==
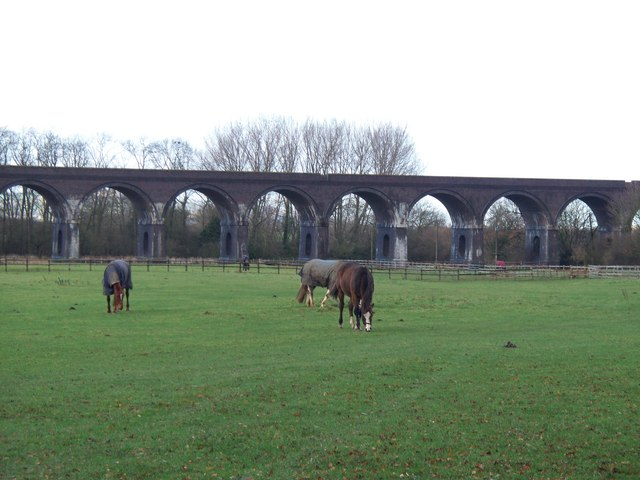
The Stanway Viaduct, out of use for 52 years, is now carrying steam trains to Broadway.

Between 1905 and 1960, the village was served by Laverton Halt on the Honeybourne line, part of the Great Western Railway network.

During 2011-12, Laverton Halt was brought back into use (as a run-round loop) by the Gloucestershire Warwickshire Railway, a heritage railway. This ceased when the line was extended to Broadway, Worcestershire in 2018.
