= Patrick Delany (theologian) =

Irish clergyman and theologian (1685/6–1768)

- Born: 1685/6; Rathcrea, Queen's County, Ireland
- Died: 6 May 1768 (aged 82); Dublin, Ireland
- Resting place: Glasnevin Cemetery
- Occupations: Clergyman; theologian
- Notable work: The Doctrine of Abstinence from Blood Defended (1734)
- Spouses: Margaret Tenison (m. 1731; died 1741) Mary Pendarves (m. 1743)

Patrick Delany (1685/6 – 6 May 1768) was an Irish clergyman and theologian. Educated at Trinity College Dublin, he became a Senior Fellow before leaving the college after conflicts with its provost, Richard Baldwin. He later held clerical office in Dublin and was appointed Dean of Down in 1744.

Delany published mainly theological works, including The Doctrine of Abstinence from Blood Defended (1734), a defence of Christian vegetarianism. He was associated with Dublin literary society through Delville House in Glasnevin, where Jonathan Swift was among his visitors. He was married first to Margaret Tenison and later to Mary Pendarves Delany, whose correspondence recorded their life at Delville.

== Biography ==
=== Early life and education ===
Delany was born around 1685 in Rathcrea, Queen's County, Ireland.

Delany was educated at Trinity College Dublin, where he entered as a sizar. He was elected a Scholar and later became a Senior Fellow.

=== Clerical career ===
Delany became known as a preacher at Saint Werburgh's, Dublin, where he attracted the attention of Lord Carteret, then Lord Lieutenant of Ireland. His Toryism brought him into conflict with Richard Baldwin, the provost of Trinity College Dublin, who eventually forced him to resign from the college. Delany exchanged his Fellowship for the office of Chancellor of Christ Church, Dublin, a move that left him in reduced circumstances in the late 1720s.

In May 1744, Delany was made Dean of Down. On one occasion he preached before George II. According to Alfred Webb, Delany was so affected by the royal presence that Mary Delany wrote out the text for the royal pew.

=== Marriage and Delville ===
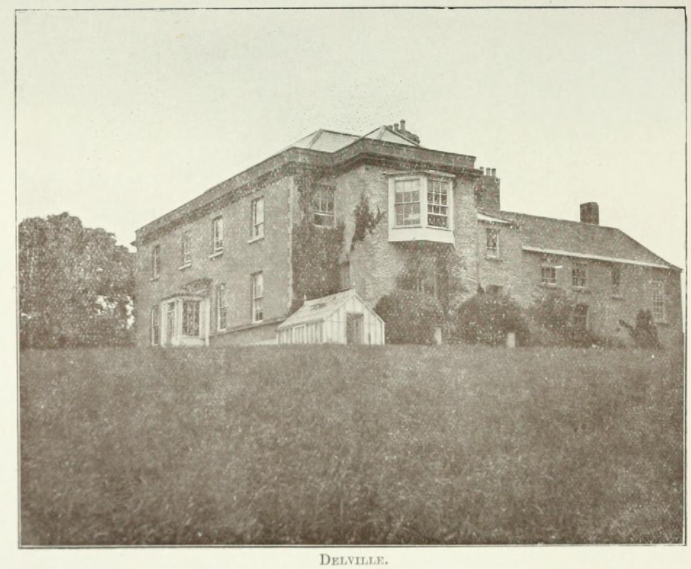
Delville House, Glasnevin, Dublin

In 1731, Delany married Margaret Tenison, the widow of Richard Tenison. Webb described her as "a rich Irish widow", whose fortune allowed Delany to resume the hospitality and literary life for which he was known. Margaret Tenison died in 1741.

In 1743, Delany married Mary Pendarves (née Granville), widow of Alexander Pendarves and niece of Lord Lansdowne. She had first visited Delany during his first wife's lifetime and had admired his character and writings. Webb wrote that the marriage was happy, and quoted Mary Delany as saying: "I could not have been so happy with any man in the world as the person I am now united to; his real benevolence of heart, the great delight he takes in making everyone happy about him, is a disposition so uncommon, that I would not change that one circumstance of happiness for all the riches and greatness in the world."

Delany and his wives were associated with Delville House in Glasnevin, where he received members of Dublin literary society. Jonathan Swift was among the visitors to Delville.

=== Writing ===
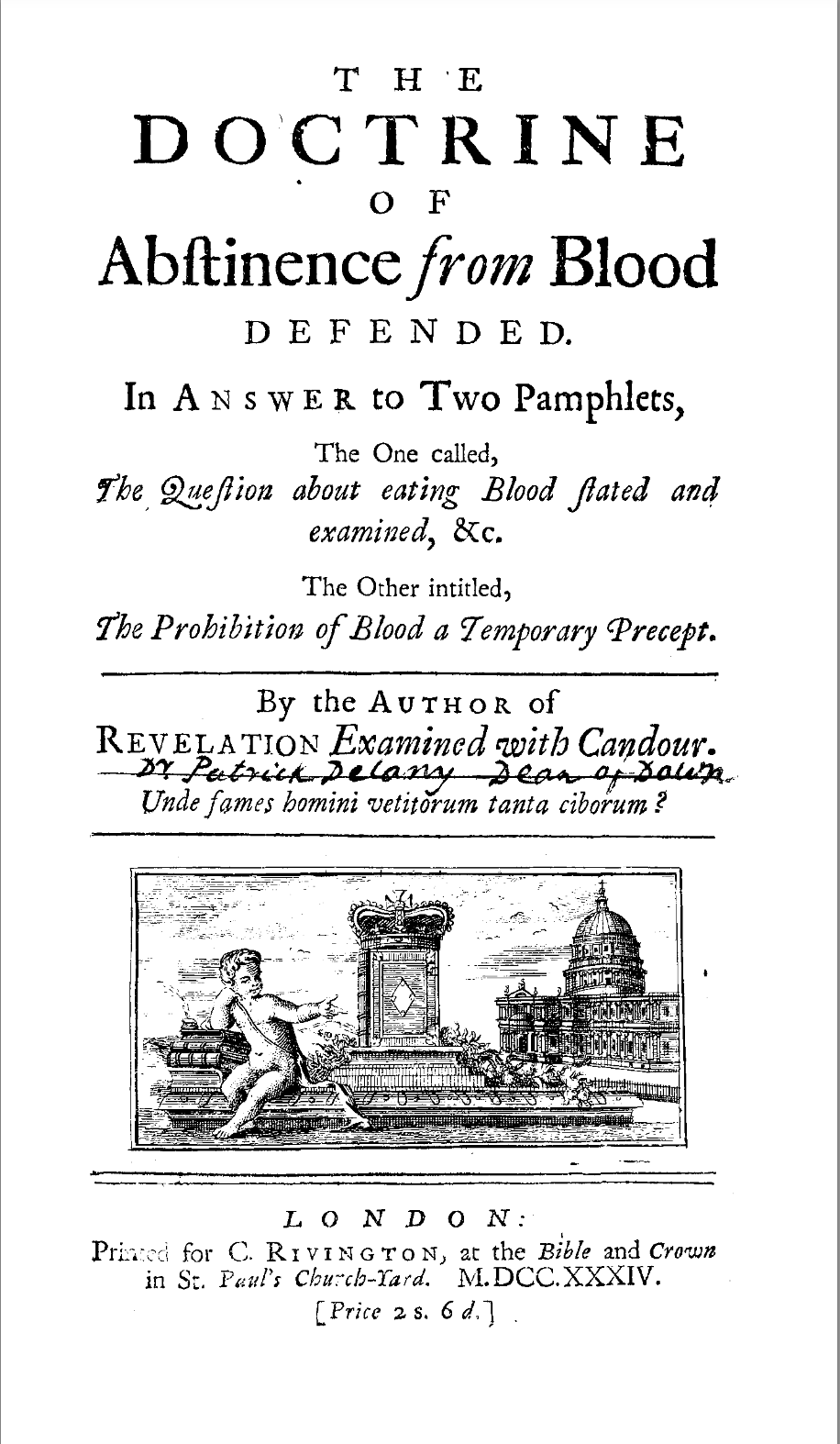
The Doctrine of Abstinence from Blood Defended (1734)

Delany published several works, mainly on theological subjects. He also defended the memory of his friend Jonathan Swift against criticisms made by Lord Orrery.

Delany has been described as a vegetarian, an unusual practice for his time. His writings include The Doctrine of Abstinence from Blood Defended (1734), a defence of Christian vegetarianism. The work answered the pamphlets The Question About Eating Blood Stated and Examined and The Prohibition of Blood a Temporary Precept, the latter by William Burscough, Bishop of Limerick. In it, Delany discussed the biblical grants to Adam and Noah, the meaning of human dominion over animals, the use of animals in sacrifice, the Lord's Supper, and the Apostolic Decree. Akiko Aoyagi and William Shurtleff describe the book as the earliest English-language document then identified that used "abstinence" in relation to a vegetarian diet.

=== Death ===
Delany spent his last years in poor health and depression. Webb wrote that his circumstances had also been reduced by his generosity and hospitality. He died in Dublin on 6 May 1768, aged about 82, and was buried in Glasnevin Cemetery.
