= Manor of Glasnevin =

Medieval manor or liberty that existed in Dublin, Ireland

The Manor of Glasnevin (also known as the Manor of Grange Gorman) was one of several manors, or liberties, that existed in Dublin, Ireland since the arrival of the Anglo-Normans in the 12th century. They were town lands united to the city, but still preserving their own jurisdiction.

== Location ==
The manor was located on the north side of the city. Its boundaries stretched from Summerhill to Stoneybatter, about thirty-three streets, along with Mountjoy Square.

== Privileges ==
In return for the support of the Lord of the Manor, or to alleviate certain hardships suffered by Englishmen or the church in Ireland, privileges were granted to the manor. These allowed the manor to have its own courts of justice, where they were allowed to try a limited number of crimes, mainly dealing with bad debts.

These rights and privileges ended in 1840.

== Administration ==
The officers of the manor consisted of a seneschal, registrar and marshal, who were appointed by the Bishop of Kildare, as Dean of Christ Church, Dublin. The court was in a private house at the corner of the North Circular Road and Dorset Street. Grand juries were sworn in at Easter and Michaelmas.

In 1813 the population of this manor was 2,884 males and 4,849 females.
