= Destruction of Irish country houses (1919–1923) =

The destruction of country houses in Ireland was a phenomenon of the Irish revolutionary period (1919–1923), which saw at least 275 country houses deliberately burned down, blown up, or otherwise destroyed by the Irish Republican Army (IRA). The vast majority of the houses, known in Ireland as big houses, belonged to the Anglo-Irish upper class known as the Protestant Ascendancy. The houses of some Roman Catholic unionists, suspected informers, and members or supporters of the new Irish Free State government were also targeted. Although the practice by the IRA of destroying country houses began in the Irish War of Independence, most of the buildings were destroyed during the Irish Civil War (1922–1923). Today, most of the targeted buildings are in ruins or have been demolished. Some were restored by their owners, albeit often smaller in size, or were later rebuilt and re-purposed.

== The Big House as a target ==
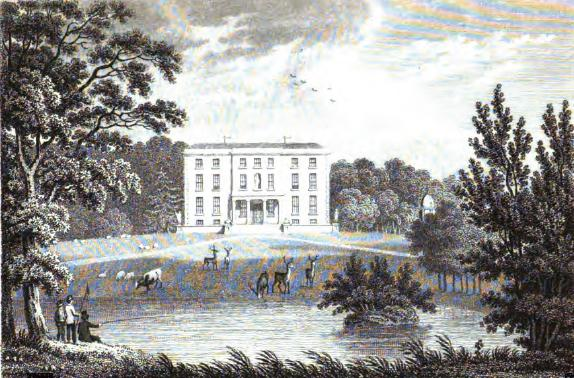
Ballynastragh House depicted in 1826, typical of the "Big Houses" targeted by the IRA.

By the start of the Irish revolutionary period in 1919, the Big House had become symbolic of the 18th and 19th-century dominance of the Protestant Anglo-Irish class in Ireland at the expense of the native Roman Catholic population, particularly in southern and western Ireland.

The Anglo-Irish, as a class, were generally opposed to Irish republicanism and held key positions in the Dublin Castle administration. The Irish nationalist narrative maintained that the land of Irishmen had been illegally stolen from them by the Anglo-Irish aristocracy, who had mostly arrived in Ireland as Protestant settlers from Great Britain during the plantations of Ireland. The Anglo-Irish big house was at the administrative centre of the estates of the landowners, as well as being the family seat from which the Anglo-Irish exerted their political control over the island.

This perception was popularly held by nationalists, despite a considerable increase in Irish landownership in the previous decades due to the Irish Land Acts. Whereas in 1870, 97% of land was owned by landlords and 50% by just 750 families, by 1916, 70% of Irish farmers owned their own land. Catholics had been emancipated in 1829 and the political dominance of the Anglo-Irish in Ireland had consequently declined following the electoral successes of the Catholic nationalist Irish Parliamentary Party through much of the 19th century.

The former Protestant Ascendancy had lost its economic power following the Great Famine of 1845-49, and the Long Depression of the 1870s; and then lost its political power after the Representation of the People Act 1884. By 1915 the Irish Land Commission had transferred over 60% of Irish farmland to tenant farmers, leaving most of the former landed gentry with a house and a home farm known as a "demesne". The former landlords could afford to employ gardeners and household staff as they had received, as a group, the equivalent of over €60 billion (in 2019 euro) in compensation from the British government.

=== Irish War of Independence ===
In the destruction of the country houses of the aristocracy and landed gentry, the IRA hoped to overcome a culture of deference towards the landowning class. As early as 1918, IRA organiser Ernie O'Malley had his Volunteers train in demesne grounds to "rid them of their inherent respect for the owners".

During the Irish War of Independence, big houses were often targeted in reprisal for the destruction or defacement of houses owned by suspected IRA members or sympathisers by British forces (most commonly the Black and Tans and Auxiliary Division of the Royal Irish Constabulary). Anglo-Irish landowners typically held no influence over British counterinsurgency policies in any given area, and reprisal attacks on big houses by the IRA were bolstered by the assumption that their owners were always unionists. "In April 1921, north Cork IRA leader, Liam Lynch, enraged by the destruction of several houses in reprisal for an IRA ambush declared, 'six big houses and castles of their friends, the Imperialists will go up for this.'"

At least 76 country mansions were destroyed in the Irish War of Independence; 30 big houses were burned in 1920 and another 46 in the first half of 1921, mostly in the conflict's Munster heartland, i.e. the counties of Cork, Kerry, Tipperary, Clare and Limerick.

Historian James S. Donnelly stated in a study of the burning of over 50 country houses in County Cork from 1919 to 1921 that although there may have been agrarian or sectarian animosities at work, most of the houses targeted by the IRA were burnt either to deny them as potential billets to British forces or as reprisals for house burnings committed by British forces. Similarly, a study of the border region of counties of Louth, Cavan and Monaghan found no such burnings until June and July 1921, coinciding with a sizeable British Army offensive in the area and that the main motive was to deny the soldiers potential billets. "In this region at least it was the guerrilla tactics of the IRA and not agrarian motives that were main motive for targeting the Big Houses".

The "Big Houses" did not become the subject of a concerted campaign until the Irish Civil War. In this period there was also an increase in the level of violence towards protestant members County Cork. Of the 122 assassinated as "spies", 44, or about 36% were Protestants: about twice the percentage of Protestants in the civilian population of Cork. Mrs Mary (or Maria) Lindsay, an elderly Protestant from Coachford, was shot and killed, with her driver, in an outbuilding while her house was burning, after the authorities refused to commute the capital sentences of six IRA volunteers who were executed after Mrs. Lindsay had informed the authorities of a pending nearby ambush, after her efforts and that of a local priest to stop the pending ambush were ignored by the IRA. The degree to which such IRA violence can be categorised as sectarian as opposed to politically motivated is still the subject of much debate.

=== Irish Civil War ===
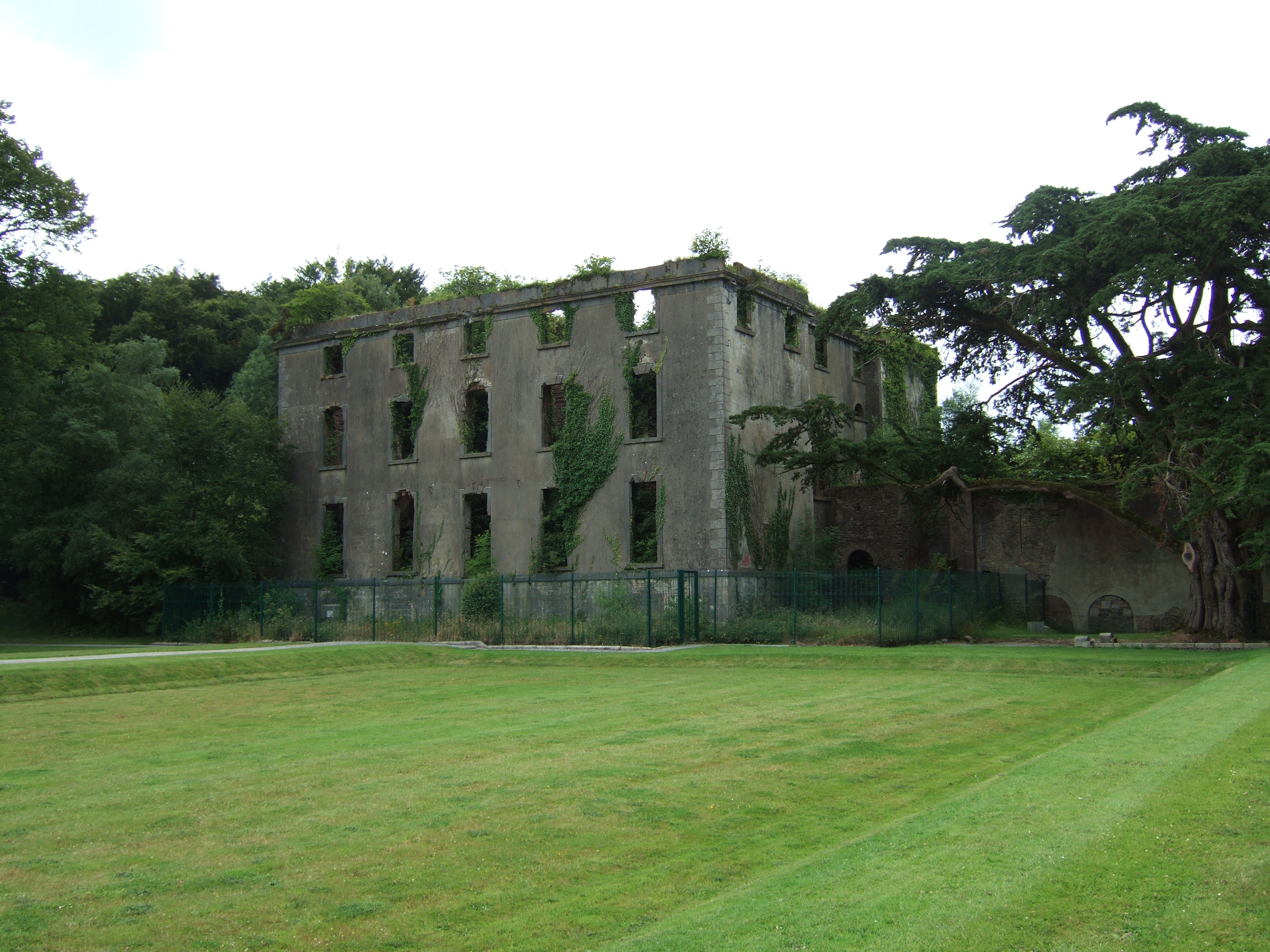
The ruins of Woodstock House in County Kilkenny, which was attacked on 2 July 1922 during the Civil War.

It is believed that 199 country houses were destroyed during the Civil War. Some mansions were destroyed in the fighting of the early months of the war, but the campaign against them began in earnest in late 1922. The leadership of the Anti-Treaty forces orchestrated a campaign of Big House destruction across Ireland. The order to burn houses of Free State supporters and "Imperialists" (as the IRA called the Anglo-Irish upper class) was given after the Irish Free State government embarked on a policy of executions of anti-Treaty Republican fighters.

Liam Lynch, anti-Treaty IRA Chief of Staff, after the execution of four senior Republicans in Mountjoy Prison, issued a General order on 8 December 1922 that, "all Free State supporters are traitors and deserve the latter's stark fate, therefore their houses must be destroyed at once", and, on 26 January 1923, issued another order for property destruction and possible killing of Free State Senators in reprisal.

The ostensible reason for the coordinated attack on the "Big Houses" therefore was that many of their owners were senators in the Senate or Seanad. However, others were targeted because the IRA listed them as "Imperialists" or in some cases "Freemasons". Most country houses were isolated and in rural areas, and targeting them forced the National Army to allocate their stretched resources to protecting landowners, while also creating an atmosphere of panic among Anglo-Irish people, as well as unionists in general. As such, the country house was regarded by the IRA as a "soft target".

Attacks were planned and organised, and generally focused on Irish peers who had sat in the House of Lords, members of the Senate of the Irish Free State and former Irish Unionist Party politicians. The assault on the "Big Houses" was part of a wider campaign against Free State supporters as a reprisal for the executions policy of the Government. In Dublin for instance, out of 28 homes burned by the IRA between 10 December 1922 and the end of April, nine could be counted as Big Houses or mansions associated with the Anglo-Irish aristocracy. As well as members of the gentry, the houses of newspaper owners and editors, members of the National Army and former British Army officers, and justices of the peace were also targeted.

Some Free State TDs, such as Liam Burke and Seán McGarry, were targeted; in the case of the latter causing the death of his seven-year-old son, Emmet. The former's home was demolished but the latter rebuilt his property. The Ballyboden home of the President of the Executive Council of the Irish Free State, W. T. Cosgrave, was burned down in January 1923. The Foxrock, County Dublin home of the Anglo-Irish politician Sir Horace Plunkett, a distant relation to Count Plunkett, was burnt down in 1923, despite his reputation as a social reformer.

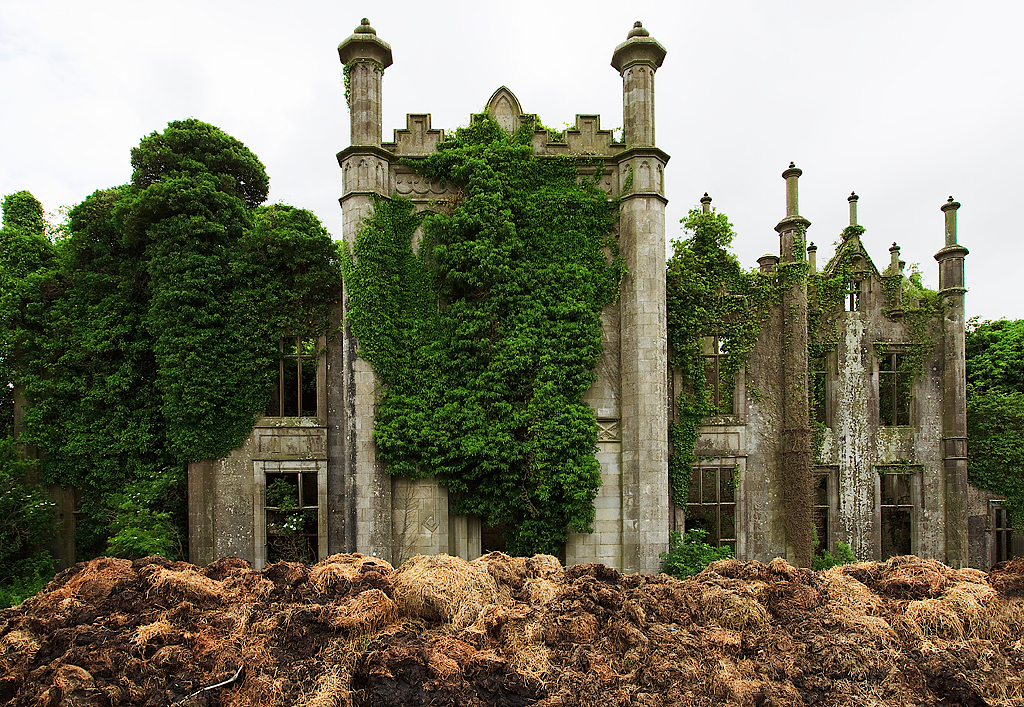
Coolbawn House, near Rathnure in County Wexford, was burned in February 1923 and not repaired or rebuilt

Some houses, such as Ballycarty House, were purportedly also attacked to prevent their being used as garrisons by Free State forces. The size of the buildings targeted ranged from small to palatial. Most were destroyed by being set on fire, their interiors having been doused in petrol, although in some instances houses were blown up using high explosives. The attempt to burn down Burton Hall, Stillorgan, the home of Henry Guinness, in March 1923 failed when a mine planted there failed to explode.

In most cases, no one was injured during the destruction of the house. It is recorded that in several cases, members of the IRA helped the targeted family to remove their possessions from the house before it was destroyed. When the home of Dermot Bourke, 7th Earl of Mayo, was attacked on 29 January 1923, he described the IRA guerrillas as being "excessively polite" and apologetic. Nonetheless, there were incidents of violence and deaths in such attacks. The Church of Ireland Gazette recorded numerous instances of Unionists and Loyalists being shot, burned out or otherwise forced from their homes during the early 1920s.

Senator John Philip Bagwell was kidnapped during the attack on his home. Country houses were often looted during and following their destruction, and in most cases a family's possessions were entirely destroyed. Homes of pro-Treaty Catholic nationalists, such as Oliver St John Gogarty and George Moore were targeted. The former was rebuilt, but the latter was not. The library of Moore Hall, County Mayo, containing ancient manuscripts relating to Irish and world history, was entirely destroyed in February 1923.

Not all such houses were regarded by the IRA as targets, depending upon their ownership. Mount Trenchard House in Foynes, County Limerick was the home of Mary Spring Rice, a nationalist activist, and the building was used by the IRA as a safe house.

== Aftermath ==
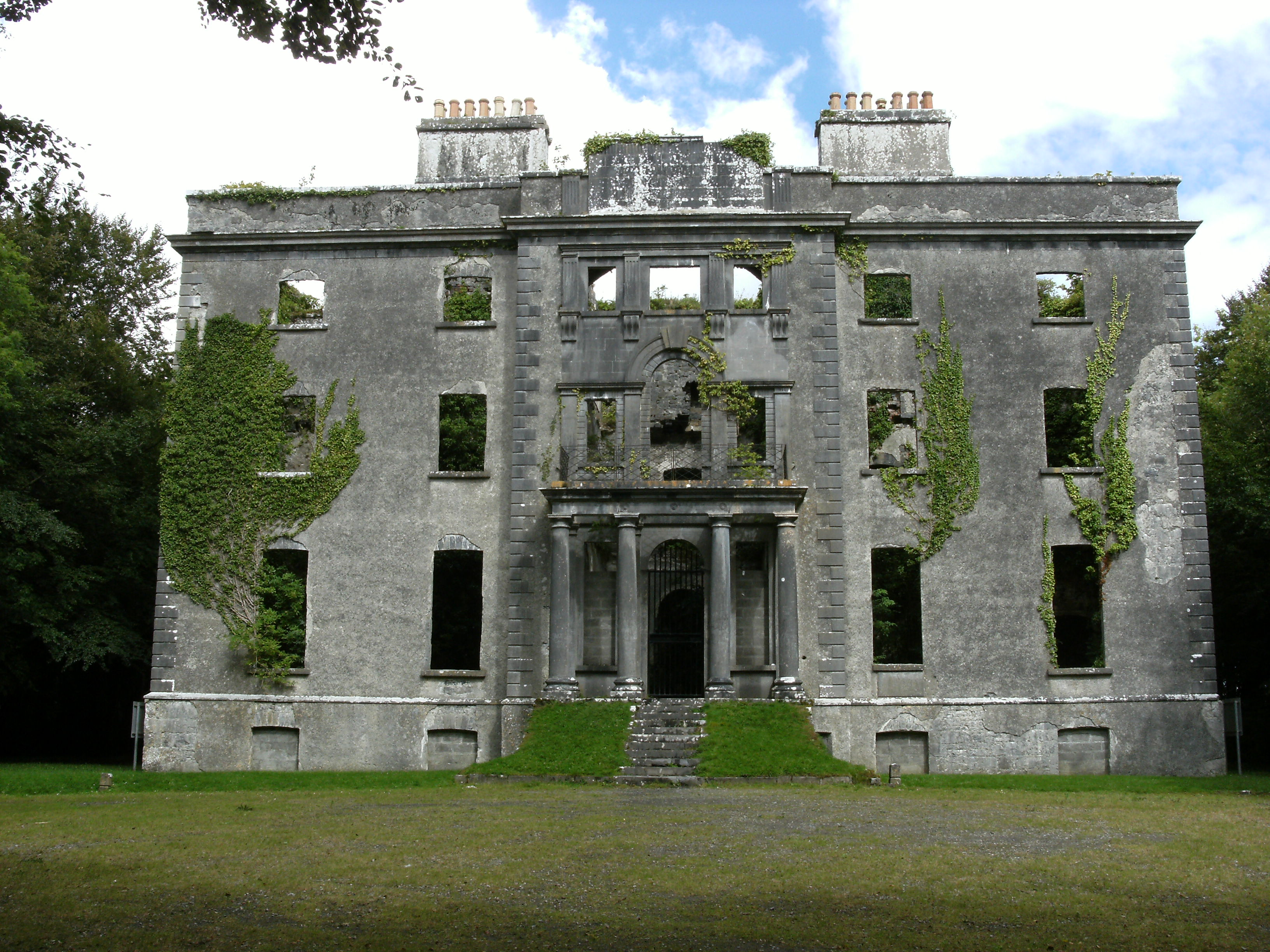
The ruins of Moore Hall, County Mayo, which was abandoned after being burnt down by the IRA in 1923.

Most of the properties targeted by the IRA were abandoned following the attacks. The widespread use of petrol and other incendiaries ensured that most of the buildings were completely gutted by fire and rendered uninhabitable. The state of the buildings, as well as fear of a repeat attack, meant that few of the country houses were rebuilt. Most were demolished, while others remain as ruins. Most of the owners sought compensation from the Irish Free State government. Ebenezer Pike claimed £62,000 for the destruction of Kilcrenagh House, arguing his losses were "enormous, for valuable furniture, paintings, and art treasures were all consumed in the flames."

Both of Sir Augustus Digby Warren's properties in County Cork were destroyed. William Downes Webber sought compensation from the Irish Free State totalling £149,000 for the rebuilding and £18,000 for the contents of Mitchelstown Castle; £27,500 for the building and the full £18,000 for the contents were eventually awarded by Justice Kenny in 1926. Webber deemed the award for rebuilding too small and relocated to Dublin.

The period of the destruction of the Big Houses came to play an important part in Irish culture. William Butler Yeats decried the targeting of big houses in the poem "Meditations in Time of Civil War" (1924). In The Last September (1929), Elizabeth Bowen mythologised the big houses as an ideal of civilisation and order, yet one which had its origins in injustice and could not be expected to survive in the modern world. The destructions were also haphazard and case-by-case. Some mansions like Dunsany Castle, owned by Edward Plunkett, 18th Baron of Dunsany, were spared because of his fame and because the house contained holy relics of the martyred Saint Oliver Plunket, that were revered and visited by local people. Other families such as the Shackleton family or the Guinness family were unaffected because of their local popularity, even though they were not supporters of Irish independence.

== Resurgence during the Troubles ==
During the Troubles in Northern Ireland, the practice of targeting the big house was revived by the Provisional Irish Republican Army, although there were relatively few such houses in the six counties. Most notoriously, Tynan Abbey was attacked on the night of 21 January 1981. The 86-year-old Sir Norman Stronge and his only son James, (both former MPs), were killed by the Provisional Irish Republican Army. The house was then burnt to the ground. The bodies of Norman and James were later recovered from their burning home.

In July 1972, Stuart Hall, County Tyrone, was damaged extensively by an IRA bomb; the house was later demolished. On 5 November 1973 a 50 lb (23 kg) bomb wrecked a milking parlour on the grounds of Cappoquin House, home of Sir Richard Keane, at Belmont, Cappoquin, County Waterford. The attack took place amidst a dispute between Sir Richard and his 65 tenants in Cappoquin over ground rents. The Official IRA were believed to be responsible.

On 16 May 1981 Killeen Castle in Dunsany, County Meath was extensively damaged in an arson attack carried out by republican sympathisers. The men involved spread petrol in several rooms before setting it alight. The attack came at the height of the H-Block campaign for political status for republican prisoners in Northern Ireland and an ongoing hunger strike. The castle was by that point owned by an Irish businessman, Basil Brindley; one of the men accused of carrying out the attack later said he would not have burned the house if he knew it was owned by an Irishman.

On 11 May 1991 a Provisional IRA unit armed with assault rifles and machine guns sprayed Caledon House in County Tyrone. An IRA statement released afterwards claimed that British soldiers guarding the house were the intended target and the unit involved had fired over seven hundred rounds. Previously, a bomb attack on 10 November 1972 had caused extensive damage to the building. The 40 lb (18 kg) bomb demolished a wall, blew out windows and caused other damage. Police believed the residence was targeted because Nicholas Alexander, 7th Earl of Caledon was a company commander in the Ulster Defence Regiment. On 14 March 1973 a British Army Technical Officer discovered two bombs inside a monument on the grounds of the estate dedicated to Du Pré Alexander, 2nd Earl of Caledon. The 80-foot-tall (24 m) monument was destroyed when the soldier attempted to neutralise the two bombs in a controlled explosion, instead detonating the devices.

== Cultural references ==
- The Last September by Elizabeth Bowen ends with the conflagration of the fictional Danielstown house.
- Moydrum Castle in County Westmeath, burned in July 1921, provided the background cover art image for the 1984 long-player release The Unforgettable Fire by the rock band U2.
- In season 3 of Downton Abbey, Tom Branson is on the run from the Irish authorities after being connected with the burning down of a fictionalised country house called Drumgoole Castle.

== List of houses destroyed ==
| Year | This list | Dooley 2001 |
|---|---|---|
| 1920 | 16 | 30 |
| 1921 | 51 | 46 |
| 1922 | 23 | 82 |
| 1923 | 41 | 117 |
| Total | 130 | 275 |

Additionally, 21 houses are being investigated as burnt in 1920: Ballintubber House, Ballyclough/Ballyclogh House, Ballyvary/Bellavary House, Beechlawn House, Birdhill (Marlfield Co Tipperary), Castlelambert/Castle Lambert House, Coolkellure/Coolkelure House, Crotto/Crotta House, Crowsnest, Doolin House/Castle, Glenart Castle, Glenfarne Hall, Hermitage House (Co Limerick), Kilturra, Malin Hall, Moorock House, Mount Massey/Massy House, Roxborough House, Saunders Grove, Tanavalla/Garryantanvally.

Note: The 'Date of attack' is assumed to be overnight, either late at night on that day, or continuing/beginning in the early hours of the next day, unless clarified by the notation p.m. or a.m.

| House | Location | County | Owner or occupier | Date of attack | Current state |
|---|---|---|---|---|---|
| Aasleagh Lodge | Aghagower | County Mayo | George Browne, 6th Marquess of Sligo | 1923 | Rebuilt |
| Annaskeagh House | Dundalk | County Louth | Augustus N. Sheridan JP | 11 February 1923 | Demolished |
| Antrim Castle | Antrim | County Antrim | Algernon Skeffington, 12th Viscount Massereene | 28 October 1922 | During a grand ball on 28 October 1922, the castle caught fire and was destroyed. Although much of the evidence pointed to arson by the IRA, the official verdict was not conclusive and thus no insurance claim was paid out. The castle remained as a ruin until its demolition in 1970. Only a slightly raised grassed platform as well as a freestanding Italian tower which was built in 1887 and a gatehouse remain. |
| Ardamine House | Gorey | County Wexford | Major A. W. Mordaunt-Richards | 9 July 1921 | Demolished |
| Ardfert Abbey (Ardfert House) | Ardfert | County Kerry | John Burrell Talbot-Crosbie | 22 August 1922 | Demolished |
| Ardtully House | Kilgarvan | County Kerry | Raymond William Orpen | 1921 | Abandoned as ruins |
| Artramon House | Wexford | County Wexford | Sir George Le Hunte | February 1923 | Rebuilt; now a hotel |
| Ballybay House | Ballybay | County Monaghan | Edward Henry John Leslie | 2 June 1921 | Demolished |
| Ballycarty House | Tralee | County Kerry | Nash family | January 1923 | Abandoned as ruins |
| Ballydonnellan Castle | Killalaghtan | County Galway | Donnellan family | January 1923 | Abandoned as ruins |
| Ballydugan House | Kilrickle | County Galway | Burke family | 15 June 1922 | Rebuilt by the original family |
| Ballygassan House | Ballygassan | County Louth | John Russel | 3 February 1923 | Rebuilt |
| Ballynastragh House | Gorey | County Wexford | Sir Thomas Esmonde, 11th Baronet | 9 March 1923 | Demolished; smaller house was later built on the site |
| Ballyrankin House | Bunclody | County Wexford | Walter Clarmont Skrine and Moira O'Neill | 8 July 1921 | Abandoned as ruins |
| Ballywalter House | Castletownroche | County Cork | S.G. Penrose Welsted | 30 April 1921 | Rebuilt smaller |
| Bearforest | Mallow | County Cork | Major Charles Purdon Coote | 1 June 1921 | Rebuilt |
| Beech Park House | Ballyboden | County Dublin | W. T. Cosgrave | 13 January 1923 | Rebuilt 1924 |
| Bellevue House | Ballyhogue | County Wexford | Lady Jane Emma Power | 31 January 1923 | Abandoned as ruins |
| Bessborough House | Piltown | County Kilkenny | Vere Ponsonby, 9th Earl of Bessborough | 22 February 1923 | Rebuilt 1929 |
| Burgatia House | Rosscarbery | County Cork | Thomas Kingston | 2 February 1921 | Demolished |
| Cahermore House | Rosscarbery | County Cork | Regan (merchant), previously Hungerford family | c16 June 1921 | Demolished |
| Cappoquin House | Lismore | County Waterford | Lady Adelaide Keane | 19 February 1923 | Rebuilt |
| Castleboro House | Castleboro | County Wexford | Robert Carew, 3rd Baron Carew | 5 February 1923 | Abandoned as ruins |
| Castlehacket | Tuam | County Galway | Bernard Percy Broderick | 1923 | Demolished; smaller house built on the site |
| Castle Bernard | Bandon | County Cork | James Bernard, 4th Earl of Bandon | 21 June 1921 | Abandoned as ruins |
| Castle Bernard | Kinnitty | County Offaly | Captain Caulfield French | 1922 | Restored in 1928 by means of a Government grant of £32,000 |
| Castle Cooke | Fermoy | County Cork | Colonel William Cooke-Collis | 7 June 1921 | Demolished |
| Castle Gore | Crossmolina | County Mayo | Arthur Gore, 6th Earl of Arran | 3 Sep 1922 | Abandoned as ruins |
| Castle Mary | Cloyne | County Cork | Colonel Mountifort J.C. Longfield | 19 September 1920 | Abandoned as ruins, stable courtyard converted into new home |
| Castleshane House (Castle Shane) | Monaghan | County Monaghan | John Harford Stanhope Lucas-Scudamore of Kentchurch Court | 15 February 1920 | Abandoned as ruins. Note: Later official reason for burning was 'accidental', possibly for insurance claims |
| Cavananore | Hackballscross | County Louth | Senator Bernard O'Rourke | 18 Feb 1923 | Rebuilt |
| Cecilstown Lodge | Mallow | County Cork | Esther Jane and Annie Jones | 3 June 1921 | Rebuilt |
| Charlemont Fort | Charlemont | County Armagh | James Caulfeild, 8th Viscount Charlemont | 30 July 1920 | Demolished, only the gatehouse remains (derelict) |
| Clonyn Castle | Delvin | County Westmeath | Hon. Patrick Greville-Nugent | 9 March 1923 | Rebuilt |
| Comeragh House | Kilmacthomas | County Waterford | Captain Fairholme | 1923 | Rebuilt |
| Convamore House | Ballyhooly | County Cork | William Hare, 3rd Earl of Listowel | 30 April 1921 | Abandoned as ruins |
| Coolbawn House | Rathnure | County Wexford | James Richard Dier JP | February 1923 | Abandoned as ruins |
| Coolcour / Coolcower House | Macroom | County Cork | Richard Christopher Williams | c4 July 1921 | Rebuilt; now a hotel |
| Cor Castle | Innishannon | County Cork | Mrs Caroline Stephenson | 25 June 1921 a.m. | Rebuilt 1998-2001 |
| Crookstown House | Crookstown | County Cork | Robert Warren | 13 June 1921 | Rebuilt |
| Currygrane House | Ballinalee | County Longford | Sir Henry Wilson, 1st Baronet | 10 August 1922 | Demolished |
| Derreen House | Kenmare | County Kerry | Henry Petty-Fitzmaurice, 5th Marquess of Lansdowne | 5 September 1922 | Rebuilt in a similar style in 1924-6 |
| Derry House | Rosscarbery | County Cork | Alexander Sullivan | pre-12 April 1921 | Demolished; but attached Myross Wood, where the family continued to live, remains standing. |
| Derrylahan Park | Borrisokane | County Tipperary | Lieut. Colonel Charles O. Head, JP | 2 July 1921 a.m. | Abandoned as ruins |
| Derryquin Castle | Sneem | County Kerry | Colonel Charles Wallace Warden | 28 August 1922 | Abandoned as ruins, demolished 1969 |
| Desart Court | Callan | County Kilkenny | Hamilton Cuffe, 5th Earl of Desart | 22 February 1923 | Rebuilt by 1926, sold 1934, stripped 1945, demolished 1957 |
| Downhill House | Ballina | County Mayo | Mr. John Garvey, CS, O.B.E., D.L. | 18 February 1923 | Demolished; new house built |
| Dripsey Castle House (Dripsey House) | Dripsey | County Cork | Mrs Georgina Bowen-Colthurst | 15 February 1923 (remains: early June 1921) | Rebuilt |
| Dromagh Castle | Mallow | County Cork | William N. Leader | 10 March 1921 | Abandoned as ruins |
| Dromgowna House | Berrings near Dripsey | County Cork | Miss Peggy Bowen-Colthurst | pre 11 June 1920 (remains: early June 1921) | Abandoned as ruins? |
| Dunboy (Puxley) Mansion | Castletownbere | County Cork | Henry L. Puxley | 9 June 1921 | Abandoned as ruins; Partially restored in 21st century |
| Dunsland | Glanmire | County Cork | Joseph Pike, D.L., J.P. | p.m. 29 August 1920 | Partially rebuilt by June 1925 |
| Durrow Abbey (Durrow Castle) | Tullamore | County Offaly | Otway Toler, Earl of Norbury family | 29 April 1923 | Rebuilt 1926 less top storey and porte-cochere |
| Forest House | Macroom | County Cork | Lieutenant Colonel Isaac W. Burns-Lindow/James Gollock | 7 July 1921 | Demolished |
| Frankfort House | Montenotte Hill | County Cork | Sir Alfred Dobbin | 25 May 1921 | Villa. Rebuilt |
| Gardenmorris House | Kill | County Waterford | Richard Power O’Shee | 22 February 1923 | Rebuilt, omitting a third storey at one end |
| Gaulston House | Rochfortbridge | County Westmeath | RF Wilson of Stillorgan (previously Baron Kilmaine until 1918) (vacant 2 years) | 4 June 1920 | Demolished |
| Glenmona Lodge / House | Cushendun | County Antrim | Ronald McNeill | 20 May 1922 | Rebuilt 1923 by architect Bertram Clough Williams Ellis. Now owned by National Trust. |
| Gola House | Tydavnet | County Monaghan | William Black | 25 February 1921 (or by 5 March) | Demolished |
| Graiguenoe | Thurles | County Tipperary | Clarke family | 28 February 1923 | Demolished |
| Innishannon House | Innishannon | County Cork | Brigadier General F.W.J. Caulfield (occupant), Hugh Moreton Frewen (owner) | 25 June 1921 a.m. | Demolished |
| Kellistown House | Kellistown | County Carlow | Elizabeth Pack-Beresford and sister | 23 March 1923 | Rebuilt, now the Brophy family home (aka Kellistown Cottage or The Glebe house) |
| Kilboy House | Nenagh | County Tipperary | Henry Prittie, 4th Baron Dunalley | 2 August 1922 | Partially rebuilt |
| Kilbrittain Castle | Kilbrittain | County Cork | Daniel O’Riordan and Denis F. Doyle | 25 May 1920 | Partially rebuilt |
| Kilcolman House | Bandon | County Cork | Mrs. E. M. A. Longfield | 28 June 1921 a.m. | Abandoned as ruins |
| Kilcrenagh House (aka Woodside) | Carrigrohane | County Cork | Ebenezer Pike | 25 May 1921 | Demolished, smaller house built on site |
| Kilmore House | Kilmurry McMahon | County Clare | Hickman family | 30 July 1922 | Demolished. Note: 8 or 18 May 1921 fire with minor damage |
| Kilmorna House | Listowel | County Kerry | Sir Arthur Vicars (owned by sister Edith) | a.m. 14 April 1921 | Demolished |
| Kiltanon / Kiltannon House | Tulla | County Clare | Colonel Molony | 15 September 1920 | Abandoned as ruins |
| Kilteragh House | Foxrock | County Dublin | Sir Horace Plunkett | 30 January 1923 | Partially restored as several houses |
| Knockabbey or Thomastown Castle | Tallanstown | County Louth | O'Reilly | 2 March 1923 | Rebuilt and now open to the public. |
| Leemount House | Coachford | County Cork | Mrs Mary (or Maria) Lindsay | circa 10 March 1921 | Abandoned as ruins |
| Lanesborough Lodge (Quivvy Lodge) | Belturbet | County Cavan | Charles Butler, 7th Earl of Lanesborough | 4 June 1921 | Abandoned as ruins |
| Leap Castle | Roscrea | County Offaly | Darby family | 30 July 1922 a.m. | Ruined; partially restored |
| Lisheen Castle | Thurles | County Tipperary | John F. O'Meara | 29 June 1921 | Rebuilt; now a hotel |
| Lohort Castle | Cecilstown | County Cork | Sir Tim O'Brien, 3rd Baronet | 5 July 1921 | Abandoned as ruins |
| Lydacan Castle | Carnmore | County Galway | James Greated | 28 October 1922 | Abandoned as ruins |
| Macroom Castle | Macroom | County Cork | Baroness Ardilaun | 18 August 1922 | Abandoned as ruins, mostly demolished in 1967 |
| Mayfield House | Bandon | County Cork | Hewitt R. Poole JP | 28 June 1921 a.m. | Demolished, three bay house on SE corner |
| Marlfield House | Marlfield, Clonmel | County Tipperary | John Philip Bagwell | 9 January 1923 | Rebuilt; now houses luxury apartments |
| Merton House | Rosscarbery | County Cork | Emily and Beatrice Whitley | c19 June 1921 | Demolished |
| Massbrook House | Lahardane | County Mayo | Frederick James Peregrine Birch | 3 Sep 1922 | Rebuilt |
| Milestown House | Castlebellingham | County Louth | Major Barrow | 19 January 1923 | Rebuilt |
| Mitchelstown Castle | Mitchelstown | County Cork | William Downes Webber | 12 August 1922 | Demolished 1930 |
| Moore Hall | Carra | County Mayo | Maurice Moore | 1 February 1923 | Abandoned as ruins |
| Mountshannon House | Castleconnell | County Limerick | David O'Leary Hannigan JP of Kilbolane Castle (previously Earl of Clare C18-1887) | 14 June 1920 | Abandoned as ruins |
| Mount Talbot House | Tisrara | County Roscommon | W.J. Talbot | 8 July 1922 | Abandoned as ruins |
| Moydrum Castle | Athlone | County Westmeath | Albert Handcock, 5th Baron Castlemaine | 3 July 1921 a.m. | Abandoned as ruins |
| Mullaboden | Ballymore-Eustace | County Kildare | Bryan Mahon (British General and Irish Senator) | 16 February 1923 (press report dated 17 Feb) | |
| Myshall Lodge | Myshall | County Carlow | Cornwall Brady family (unoccupied) | 1922 | Demolished |
| Newberry Manor | Mallow | County Cork | John Pretyman Newman | 3 June 1921 | Rebuilt; now a nursing home |
| Oakgrove (Oak Grove) | Carrigadrohid | County Cork | Captain Bowen Colthurst (vacated) | pre 7 June 1920 (remains: early June 1921) | Demolished; smaller house built on the site c.1930 (attached to the extant castellated wing) now known as Oakpark House |
| Old Court House | Strangford | County Down | Una Ross, 26th Baroness de Ros | 18 May 1922 | Demolished; smaller house built on the site |
| Palmerstown House | Johnstown | County Kildare | Dermot Bourke, 7th Earl of Mayo | 29 January 1923 | Rebuilt without the third floor with mansard roof; now an events venue |
| Prospect House | Innishannon | County Cork | Michael Dennehy JP | 25 June 1921 a.m. | Villa. Smaller house rebuilt, and modern house beside. |
| Puxley Mansion | Castletownbere | County Cork | Henry W. L. Puxley | 9 June 1921 | Ruined; partially renovated |
| Rathrobin House | Mountbolus | County Offaly | Lt Col Middleton Biddulph | 18 April 1923 | Abandoned as ruins |
| Ravensdale House / Park | Ravensdale | County Louth | Thomas Archer (previously Arthur Gore, 6th Earl of Arran) | 18 June 1921 | Demolished, much of the stone including the tower was reused to build the parish church. |
| Renvyle | Connemara | County Galway | Oliver St. John Gogarty | February 1923 | Rebuilt; now a hotel |
| Richmount | Bandon | County Cork | Charles Sealy-King J.P. | March 1923 | Site now part of Bandon Grammar School |
| River View House | Innishannon | County Cork | Colonel Francis C. Godley | 25 June 1921 a.m. | Rebuilt |
| Rochestown House | Rochestown | County Tipperary | Francis H. Wise | November 1918 & February 1923 | Abandoned as ruins |
| Rockfield | Artane | County Dublin | J.J. Reddin | 1 February 1923 | Demolished |
| Rockforest | Roscrea | County Tipperary | Seamus Burke TD | March 1923 | Demolished |
| Rockmills House (Rockmills Lodge) | Glanworth | County Cork | Charles Deane Oliver | 30 April 1921 | Rebuilt by Walsh family |
| Rosslevan House | Kilraghtis | County Clare | Hon. Edward O'Brien | July 1922 | Abandoned as ruins |
| Roundhill House | Bandon | County Cork | Robert Webb Sherlock | 14 January 1923 | Rebuilt, now part of Bandon Grammar School |
| Roxborough Castle | Moy | County Tyrone | James Caulfeild, 8th Viscount Charlemont | summer 1920 | Dismantled |
| Roxborough House | Killinan | County Galway | Dudley Persse | November 1922 | Abandoned as ruins |
| Runnamoat House (Runnimead / Runnymeade) | Roscommon | County Roscommon | Major Raleigh Chichester-Constable of Burton Constable Hall (uninhabited) | 5 May 1920 | Abandoned as ruins, later demolished. Burnt 1933 (per Mark Bence-Jones, A Guide to Irish Country Houses, 1996, but 1933 appears to be incorrect) |
| Rye Court | Moviddy | County Cork | Tonson Rye family | 13 June 1921 | Demolished |
| St Austin's Abbey | Tullow | County Carlow | Doyne family (unoccupied) | 1922 | Later partially demolished |
| Shanton House | Ballybay | County Monaghan | Fitzherbert family | 8 July 1921 | Demolished |
| Shane's Castle | Randalstown | County Antrim | Hugh O'Neill, 1st Baron Rathcavan | 20 May 1922 | Ruined |
| Sillahertane House | Kenmare | County Kerry | Sarah S. Lowe | 1921 | Not burnt, just repeatedly looted, abandoned as ruins |
| Skevanish House | Innishannon | County Cork | Ethel Peacocke | 14 June 1921 | Abandoned as ruins |
| South Park House (Southpark House) | Castlerea | County Roscommon | Major Michael Joseph Balfe (uninhabited) | 5 May 1920 | Demolished |
| Springfield Castle | Broadford | County Limerick | Robert Deane-Morgan, 5th Baron Muskerry | 4 July 1921 | Main house rebuilt; partially ruined |
| Stradone House | Stradone | County Cavan | Burrowes family | 29 June 1921 | Abandoned as ruins and later demolished (outbuildings remain). |
| Summerhill House | Summerhill | County Meath | John Hercules William Rowley, 5th Baron Langford | 4 February 1921 | Demolished |
| Templemore Abbey | Templemore | County Tipperary | Sir John Craven Carden, 5th Baronet (ADRIC until May) | 19 June 1921 | Demolished |
| Temple Hill | Terenure | County Dublin | Stephen Gwynn | February 1923 | Demolished |
| Timoleague House and Castle | Timoleague | County Cork | Travers family | 3 December 1920 | Abandoned as ruins, new house built to the north in 1924 (in front of Castle, of which bottom 2 floors remain) |
| Tore House | Rochfortbridge | County Westmeath | Henry John McKenna | 11 June 1922 | Destroyed; little more than the facade and few walls of Tore House remain. |
| Tubberdaly House | Edenderry | County Offaly | Edward Beaumont-Nesbitt | 15 April 1923 | Abandoned as ruins |
| Tynan Abbey | Tynan | County Armagh | Sir Norman Stronge, Bt | 21 January 1981 | Demolished |
| Tyrone House | Kilcolgan | County Galway | St George family (vacated 1905, contents removed) | 9 August 1920 | Abandoned as ruin |
| Union Hall | Union Hall | County Cork | Col. William Spaight | 31 March 1921 | |
| Warrensgrove | Bandon | County Cork | Sir Augustus Digby Warren | mid June 1921 | Main house ruined; outbuildings renovated |
| Warren's Court | Macroom | County Cork | Sir Augustus Digby Warren | 17 June 1921 | Demolished |
| Wilton Castle | Enniscorthy | County Wexford | Captain P. C. Alcock | 5 March 1923 | Abandoned; ruined. Two storey wing and tower restored from 2006. |
| Woodbrook House | Belclare | County Galway | Renneworth family | January 1923 | Abandoned as ruins then demolished |
| Woodpark House | Scarriff | County Clare | R.F. Hibbert | 10 June 1921 | Demolished, including all outbuildings; smaller house built on the site |
| Woodstock House | Inistioge | County Kilkenny | Tighe family | 2 July 1922 | Abandoned as ruins |

== See also ==
- Anglo-Irish big house
- Destruction of country houses in 20th-century Britain
- Sale of Irish country house contents

== Sources ==
- Dooley, Terence (2001). The Decline of the Big House in Ireland: A Study of Irish Landed Families. Dublin: Wolfhound Press. ISBN 978-0-8632-7850-1.
- Dooley, Terence (2022). Burning the Big House: The Story of the Irish Country House in a Time of War and Revolution. New Haven: Yale University Press. ISBN 978-0-3002-6074-8.
- James S. Donnelly, Big House Burnings in County Cork during the Irish Revolution, 1920–21, Éire-Ireland (47: 3 & 4 Fall/Win 12); accessed. Retrieved 17 February 2015
- John Dorney, The Big House and the Irish Revolution, The Irish Story (21 June 2011); accessed. Retrieved 17 February 2015
- Lost Country Houses of Ireland and Northern Ireland and centenaries
- Ellis Wasson, "The Irish Ascendancy: Counting Country Houses from the Middle Ages to the Twentieth Century" in The Role of Ruling Class Adaptability in the British Transition from Ancien Regime to Modern State (Lampeter: Edwin Mellen Press, 2010) ISBN 978-0-7734-1464-8
