= Anglo-Irish big house =

Irish houses of the landed class

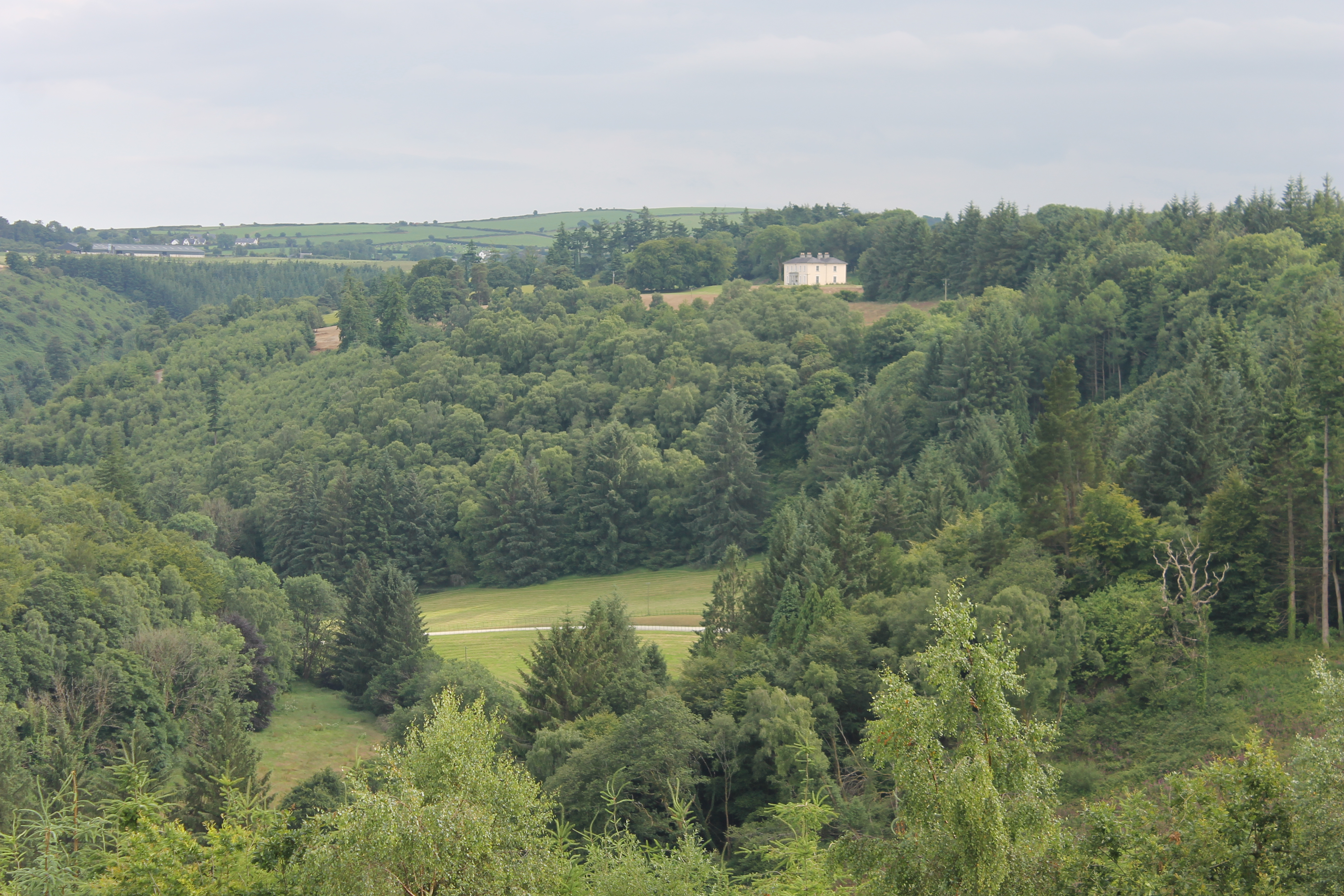
Clonwilliam House and demesne in County Wicklow

The term big house (Irish: teach mór) refers to the country houses, mansions, or estate houses of the historical landed class in Ireland. The houses formed the symbolic focal point of the landed Anglo-Irish political dominance of Ireland from the late 16th century, and many were destroyed or attacked during the Irish revolutionary period.

== Term ==
The term 'big house' came about due to the simple comparison by the tenants of estates of their dwellings with the comparatively large and luxurious residences of the Anglo-Irish aristocracy. They were termed 'big' both in reference to their size and in reference to their influence over the surrounding area. Elizabeth Bowen wrote of the big house:

"Is it height—in this country of otherwise low buildings—that got these Anglo-Irish houses their 'big' name? Or have they been called 'big' with a slight inflection—that of hostility, irony? One may call a man 'big' with just that inflection because he seems to think the hell of himself."

== History ==
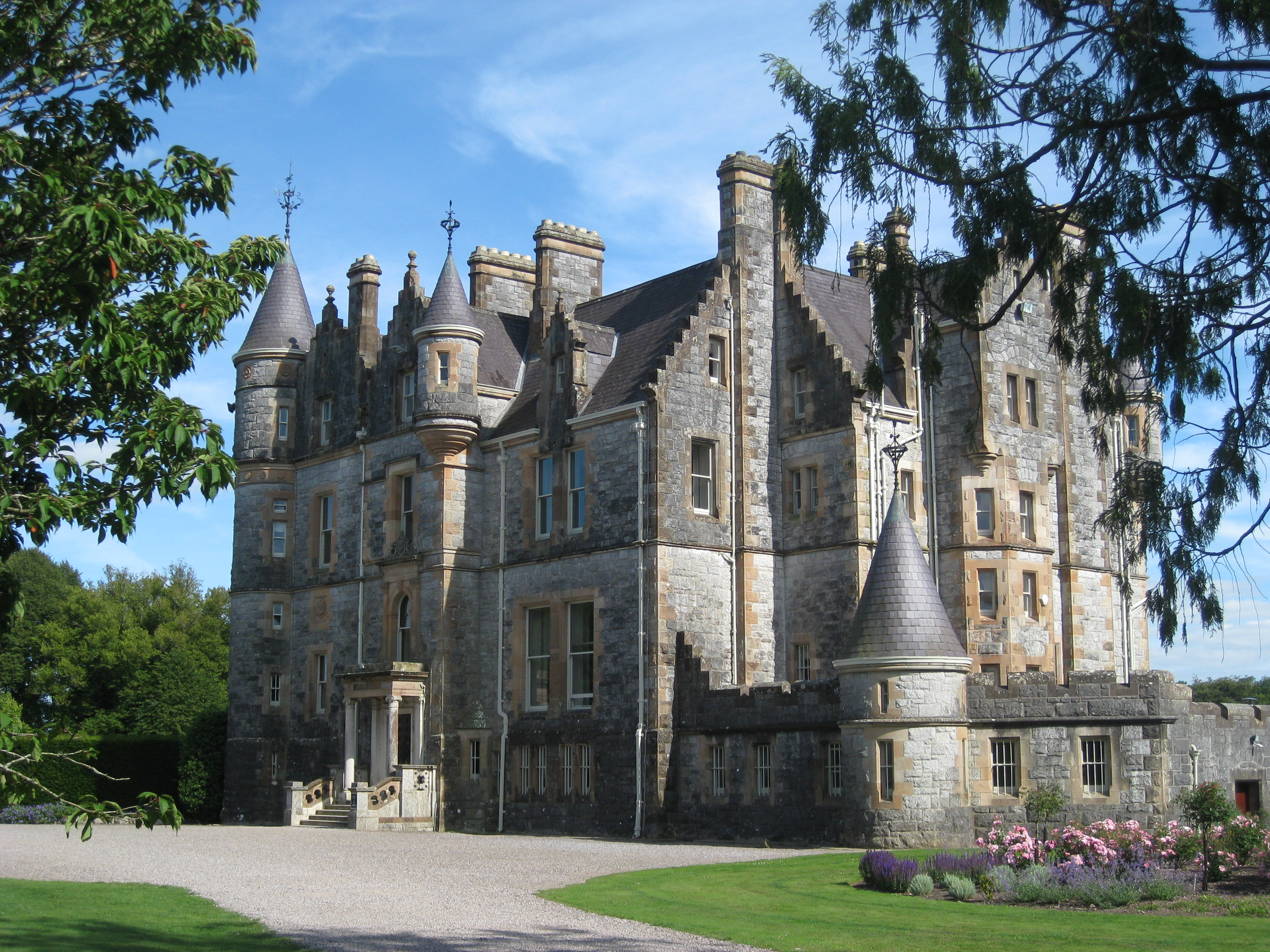
Blarney House, a typical Anglo-Irish big house and home to the Colthurst baronets.

The Anglo-Irish became the ruling class in Ireland due to the phenomenon of the Protestant Ascendancy, which saw one class controlling almost all political power in Ireland for several hundred years. Members of the Anglo-Irish class were granted huge areas of land by the British Crown and quickly became leaders in the economic, as well as political, life of Ireland. The Big Houses that this class built served to demonstrate their power and "were meant to inspire awe among equals and deference in the lower classes." As such, the houses were signifiers demonstrating the elitist social status of the landed class. The Big House was the nucleus of the larger estate, commonly referred to as the demesne, and served key functions within many Irish communities. The lord of the demesne not only controlled the lands of the community but also often exerted much political influence over it. From the 17th century, it was common for the sons of the Anglo-Irish landowners to enter politics through election to the Irish House of Commons, thus increasing the level of political control over Ireland by these elite families, many of whom had seats in the Irish House of Lords. Despite being so influential over the community in which they existed, Big Houses often had little invested in them apart from the collection of rents. The demesne was designed to provide enough food to sustain the Big House and its inhabitants, as well as provide a profit. This granted it a level of autonomy that made it increasingly independent and cut off from the community.

From the mid-1700s, the Irish nationalist movement encouraged the native Roman Catholic Irish to view the Big House and its inhabitants as being isolated from the surrounding Irish landscape. This was often the case, as the divide between the Anglo-Irish and their community was felt not only geographically but also socially. The gap between the landed families and the tenanted widened in the wake of little serious interaction between the two. The Anglo-Irish occupied a social space where they were in Ireland yet not fully Irish, and English in manner and origin yet far removed from life in England. The social and economic disparity between the Anglo-Irish and local population they were governing was, for many, epitomised by the Big House.

=== Design ===
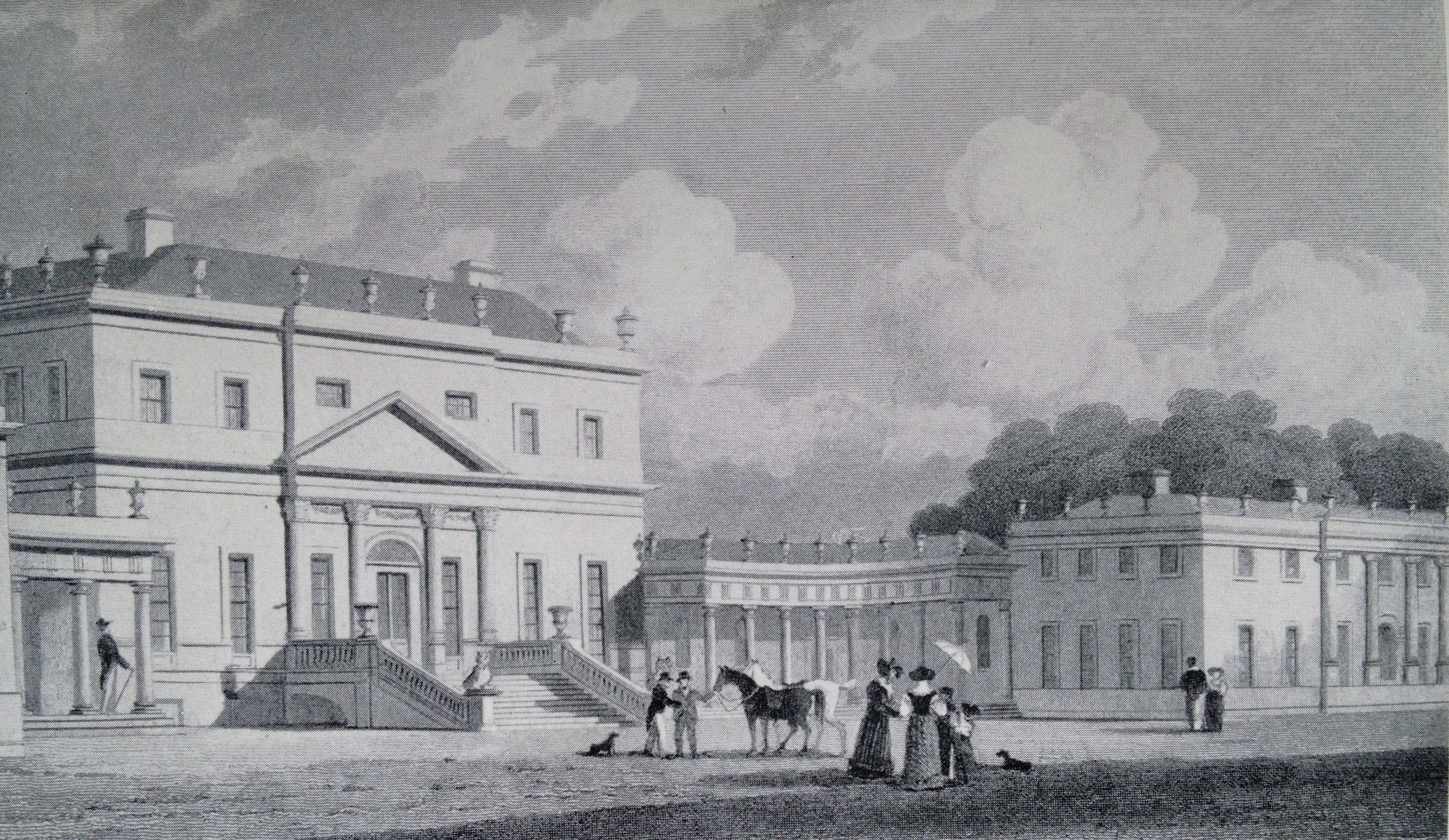
Russborough House, Ireland. One of the many country houses designed in Ireland by Richard Cassels.

The Anglo-Irish elite went to great lengths in the process of designing their homes, as well as furnishing them. They almost exclusively looked to Great Britain and the continent for style and design, claiming to "bring culture back to the Irish homes" and emphasising their separation from the culture and tastes of the native Irish. Many of the Big Houses are known today for their immense architectural value, with some acting as the only surviving work of famous Irish and European architects. Regency style became the fashionable mode of architecture for an elite home in the mid to late nineteenth century Ireland. Features of regency design include the renowned Scagliola columns of Italian influence, made of imported stone, as well as French style plaster and painted ceilings. The objects within the house were also decidedly foreign and could range from collections of valuable Flemish paintings from the Northern Renaissance all the way to the installation of Lusterweiblen, Austrian light fixtures made of antlers and carved wood. The procuring of these items was often a considerable task and served to emphasise the purchasing power of the elite and their ability to live in decadence.

The Big House had extensive parts of it devoted to leisure and entertainment, included ballrooms, drawing rooms and parlours, as well as the outside grounds of the demesne that allowed for hunting or playing fashionable sports, like cricket. Much time was devoted to these spaces as the elite had the means to pursue leisure extensively. Photography became a major leisure activity among the Anglo-Irish in the late 19th century, and photographs today serve as one of the principle references for historians of the Anglo-Irish big house.

=== In writing ===
The ability to read and write extensively was a sign of privilege. Maria Edgeworth is one of the earlier Anglo-Irish Big House writers who wrote often satirical stories about the demise of estates through the mishandling of the often absent family members. Much of her fiction is said to mirror that of her own life and family. The fact that she was a nineteenth century female writer emphasises her status as a woman of privilege.

Another later Big House writer was Elizabeth Bowen. Bowen wrote extensively on the precarious position of the elite as the power, which they had held for generations, was retracted from them piece by piece over the period of great social and political change in which Catholics were no longer denied power and land agitation and nationalism were growing. Her writings chronicle the decline of the Big House as experienced from within.

=== Decline ===
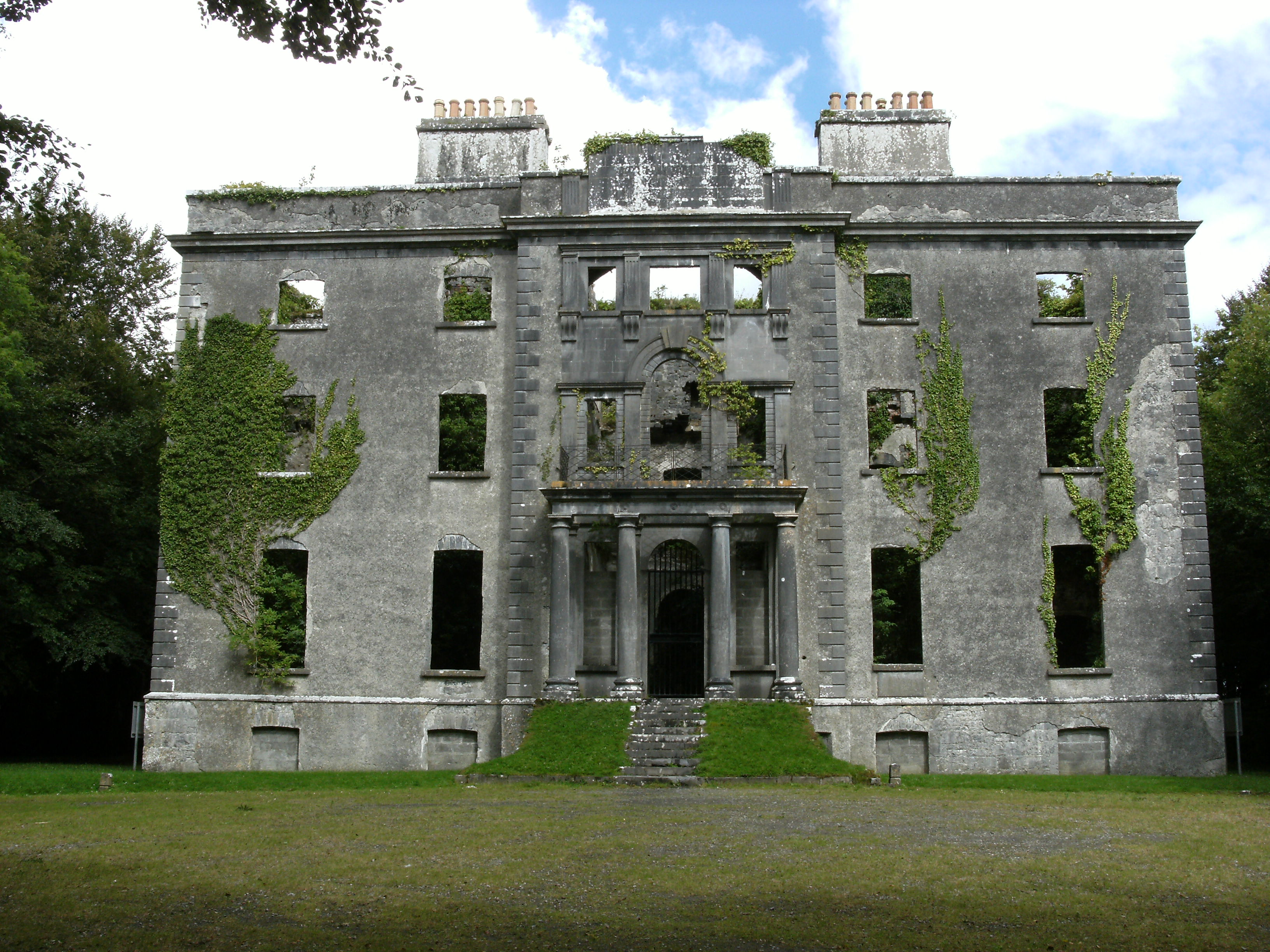
Moore Hall, County Mayo, a Big House burnt down by the IRA in 1923, and subsequently abandoned.

Successive social and political changes that took place in the nineteenth century in Ireland, such as the abolishing of the Penal Laws and the 1801 Act of Union, and also the various land acts and reforms, served to level the privileges of the landed class with those of the previously disenfranchised and largely Roman Catholic Irish population. The Great Famine in Ireland in the mid-nineteenth century also served to impact many, though not all, Big houses and landed families. The inability of tenants to pay rents and the high eviction rates experienced during the famine led to extreme rent arrears that gravely affected the landlords' income. Coupled with agricultural depression, increased land agitation, and the Land Acts of 1885 and 1891, the 'late nineteenth century saw considerable deterioration of 'big' houses and grand estates in Ireland.' For the majority, these factors 'led to landlord indebtedness which resulted in the selling off of household contents such as art and furniture and also the parcelling off and sale of demesne lands.' Attempts to end landlordism in Ireland with the Land Purchase (Ireland) Act 1903 saw financial incentives given to landlords to sell off their estates which resulted in "the sale of estates on a revolutionary scale."

By the time of the Irish revolutionary period, the Big House had lost much of its historical control and influence over Irish society. Nonetheless, the houses remained an important symbol of a divided society and they were regarded with great hostility by the native Irish. This resulted in the targeting of Big Houses during the Irish War of Independence and Irish Civil War by the Irish Republican Army. The War of Independence saw the destruction of approximately 275 'big' houses, with an estimated 199 of the houses being burnt and destroyed from 1920 to 1923. While much republican sentiment argued that these houses had to be burned because they symbolised Irish oppression, the levelling of the landed class was also meted out under socialist rhetoric. The Republican revolutionary Ernie O'Malley stated that "Under the Republic all industry will be controlled by the state for the workers' and farmers' benefit... all banks will be operated by the state... the lands of the aristocracy will be seized and divided". Many of the Big House were abandoned after they had been attacked, and only a small minority were rebuilt or restored.

After Ambrose Congreve died in 2011 aged 104, Mount Congreve was described as the "last Big House", meaning the last in which a member of the ascendancy family was resident. Killegar House has been similarly described, and is home of the widow of John Godley, 3rd Baron Kilbracken, who died in 2006.

== Present day ==
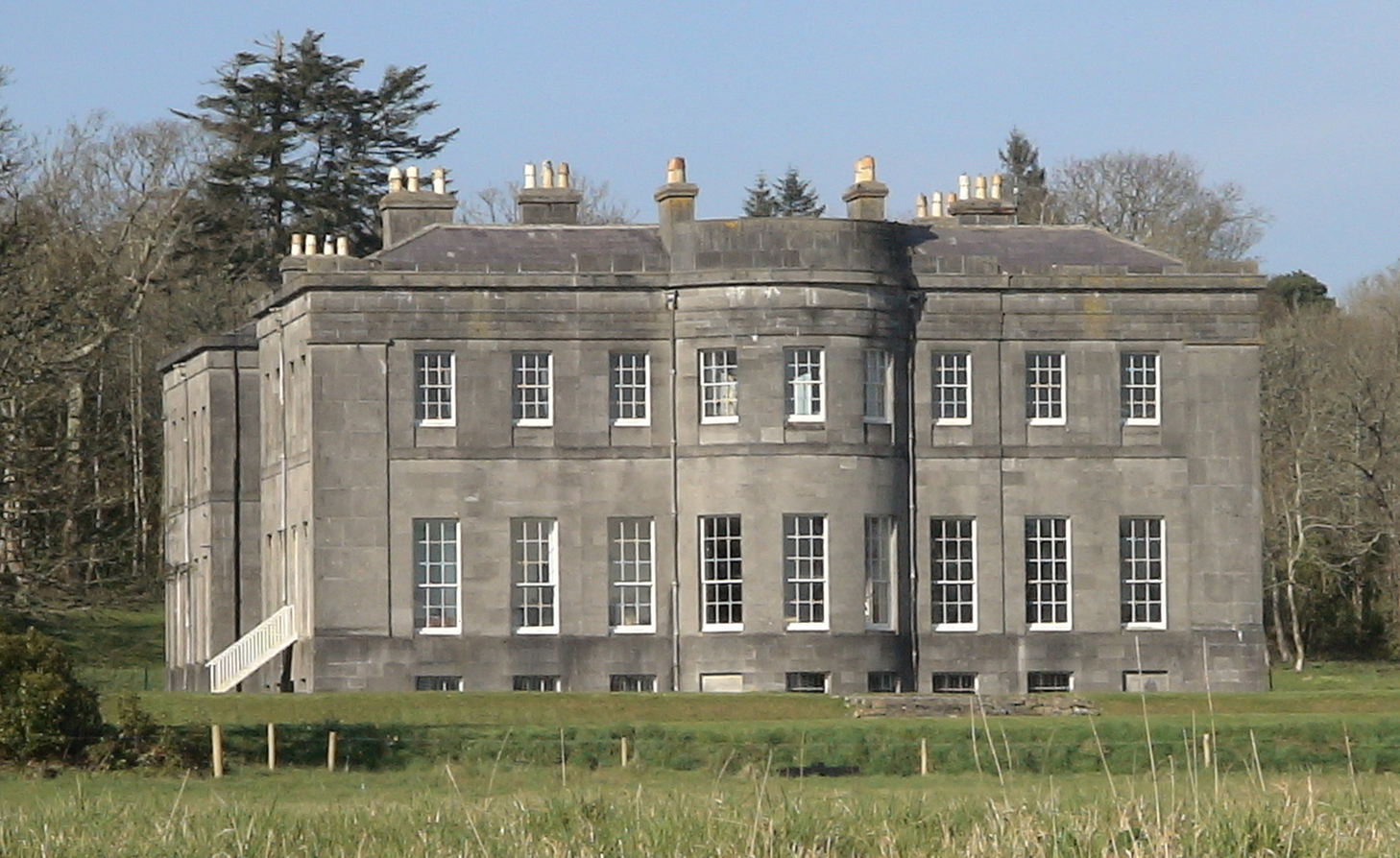
Lissadell House, the former home of the Gore-Booth baronets.

The fate of the Big House still remains undecided today as new challenges are faced in order or preserve them. Terence Dooley's work on fifty such houses outlines the different categories of 'big' houses, their modern functions, and statuses of ownership whether private or public. The work speaks of the desire to preserve and the feasibility of such practices. Dooley argues that "the future of Irish historic houses is by no means secure. Unless concerted action is undertaken, a major component of the country’s architectural, historical and cultural heritage, at both local and national level, is in danger of being substantially lost forever to the Irish people." Since the mass scale decline and destruction of the late nineteenth and early twentieth century, time now serves as the main perpetrator in the decline of these houses as surviving estates continue to fall into neglect and disrepair.

== See also ==
- List of historic houses in the Republic of Ireland
