= Tyrone House =

Ruined Georgian house in County Galway, Ireland

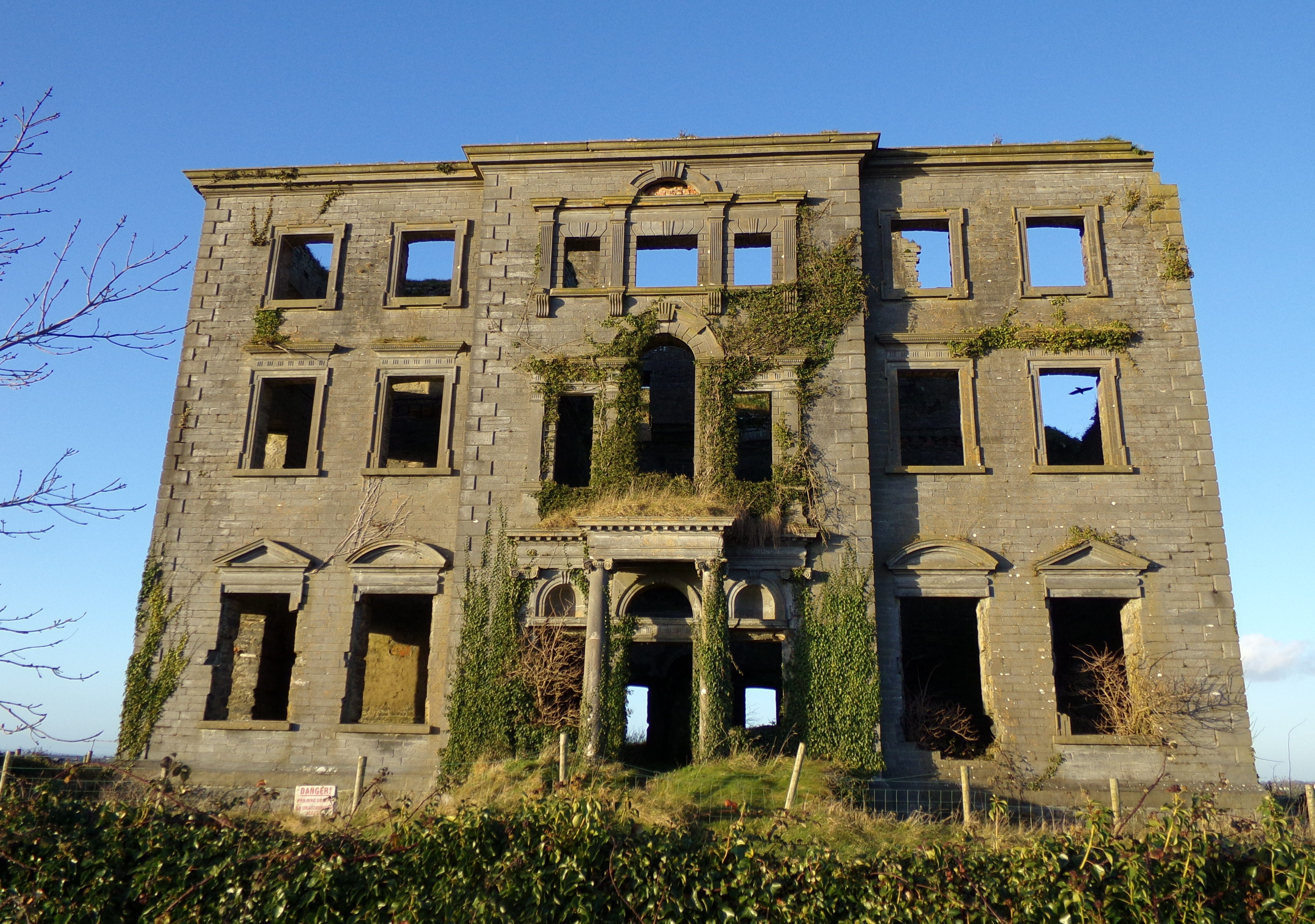

- Location within Ireland

General information
- Type: House
- Architectural style: Georgian, Palladian
- Classification: Derelict
- Location: Kilcolgan, County Galway, Ireland
- Coordinates: 53.207019°N 8.909472°W
- Estimated completion: 1779

Technical details
- Material: limestone
- Floor count: 3 over basement

Design and construction
- Architect: John Roberts
- Developer: Christopher St.George
- Known for: Inspiration for the book by Edith Somerville, The Big House of Inver

Tyrone House in County Galway is a ruined manor house, built in the 1770s on a promontory by the estuary of the Kilcolgan river, about 2 miles (3 km) from the village of Kilcolgan, County Galway, Ireland.

The house was destroyed by the local Irish Republican Army (IRA) unit during the Irish War of Independence.

== History ==
Tyrone House, County Galway, was built in 1779. It should not be confused with Tyrone House, Marlborough Street, Dublin, a townhouse designed by Richard Cassels for The 1st Earl of Tyrone of the 3rd creation in 1740.

Writing in the 1780s, Daniel Augustus Beaufort described the house as '‘large and new but very bleak and too high'.

Its original owner was Christopher St. George, scion of an old Norman Galwegian family. The house was reputedly designed by John Roberts (1712/14–1796) of Waterford, who also designed Moore Hall in County Mayo in a similar style. The St. George family at the time owned much of the area around Kilcolgan. Arthur French St. George was described as a resident proprietor in 1824.

In 1912, Tyrone House was described as "rather dilapidated" by visitor Violet Martin. It served as an inspiration for the novel "The Big House at Inver" by Edith Somerville, published in 1925.

The house was destroyed by the local IRA unit during the Irish War of Independence in 1920 due to rumours that it was going to be used by the Black and Tans as an infirmary. The house was uninhabited at the time, except for a bed-bound caretaker who was taken from the house in his bed and left in another building on the premises before the main house was set alight.
