= Thomas Roberts (painter) =

Irish landscape artist

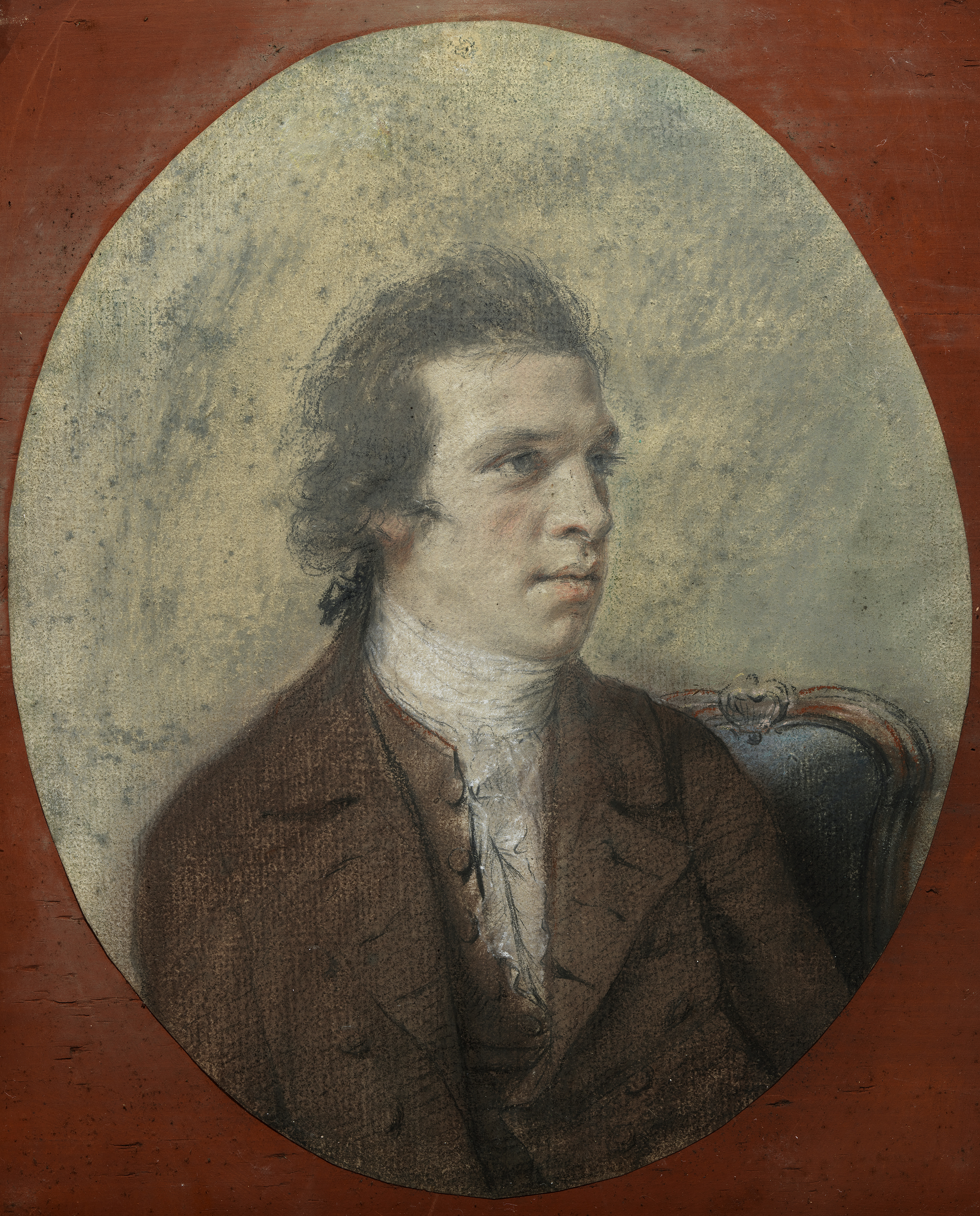
- Only known portrait of Roberts by Hugh Douglas Hamilton circa 1769
- Born: circa 1748; County Waterford, Ireland
- Died: March 1778 (aged 29–30); Lisbon, Portugal
- Known for: Landscape painter

Thomas Roberts (circa 1748–1778) was an Irish landscape artist.

== Early life ==
Born into a family of artists in County Waterford, he was the eldest son and fourth child of architect John Roberts and his wife Mary Susannah Sautelle, who was of Huguenot descent. Roberts was baptised on 22 May 1748 in Waterford. Roberts enrolled in the Dublin Society Schools in 1763, winning an award in his first year. He studied landscape painting under James Mannin.

== Career ==
"Landscape with Slane Castle" Oil on canvas, 16 x 23½ in, 40.5 x 60 cm, 1773. Exhibited at Pyms Gallery, 1999.

Thomas would become a student of the Cork painter John Butts and an apprentice of landscape painter George Mullins. He lived in Temple Bar, above the public house that belonged to Mullins' wife, the Horseshoe and Magpie. He went on to exhibit at the Society of Artists in 1766, at age 18, and continued to exhibit there until 1777. Between 1766 and 1773, he exhibited 56 paintings. From 1769, he lived at Shaw's Court, 2 Dame Street. His output declined in 1773 as his tuberculosis worsened. We won premiums in 1769, 1772 and 1777.

Roberts work was primarily landscapes, usually featuring a country house. Among his surviving works are 4 views of Dawson Grove owned by Viscount Cremorne, a view of Lord Charlemont's Casino, Beau Park, County Meath, and 4 views of Carton House, County Kildare. In the style of Italian classical landscapes, Roberts also painted imaginary landscapes. He was commissioned by Sir Watkin Williams Wynn in 1775 to paint a pair of pictures for this home on St. James's Square, London, which are still in place. Anthony Pasquin noted that he "gained more reputation as a landscape painter than any other Irishman", and fellow artist, John Warren thought that Roberts was the finest landscape painter in Britain or Ireland. Among Thomas Roberts' patrons were William FitzGerald, 2nd Duke of Leinster and Richard Wingfield, 3rd Viscount Powerscourt.

== Death and legacy ==
Roberts was living in Bath and Bristol in 1776, and for a short time recovered. Later in 1776 or early 1777 he left for Lisbon where he died in March 1778.

After Roberts' death, his younger brother, Sautelle Roberts, adopted his first name, thus becoming Thomas Sautelle Roberts. The younger Roberts, an architect, finished some of his elder brother's paintings and became a successful artist in the early 19th century.

After his death, a number of Roberts works were attributed to William Ashford, but a retrospective on his bicentenary in 1978 renewed interest in his work. In 2009, the National Gallery of Ireland exhibited 50 of his works to coincide with a new book on Roberts.

== List of paintings ==
- Lucan House and Demesne, c. 1770 – Oil on canvas commissioned by Agmondisham Vesey of Lucan House, County Dublin; now owned by the National Gallery of Ireland.
- Stormy Sea, c. 1770 – Oil on canvas; private collection, owned not named (1985).
- Landstorm, 1780 – Oil on canvas; owned by Richard Wood (1985).
- A River in Spate by a Ruined Tower and Bridge, c. 1780 – Oil on canvas; owned by Francis D. Murnaghan Jr. (1985).
