= Thomas Sautelle Roberts =

Irish landscape artist

- Born: Sautelle Roberts circa 1760; Waterford, Ireland
- Died: 1826 (aged 65–66); Dublin
- Known for: landscape painter

Thomas Sautelle Roberts (circa 1760-1826) was an Irish landscape artist.

== Early life and family ==
Born Sautelle Roberts into a family of artists in Waterford, Roberts the youngest son of architect John Roberts and his wife Mary Susannah Sautelle, who was of Huguenot descent. He had 20 or 23 siblings. After the death of his older brother in 1778, Thomas, he adopted his brother's first name to benefit from his fame as Thomas Sautelle Roberts. He married Hannah Stephens, a daughter of a Waterford merchant, in 1799.

== Career ==
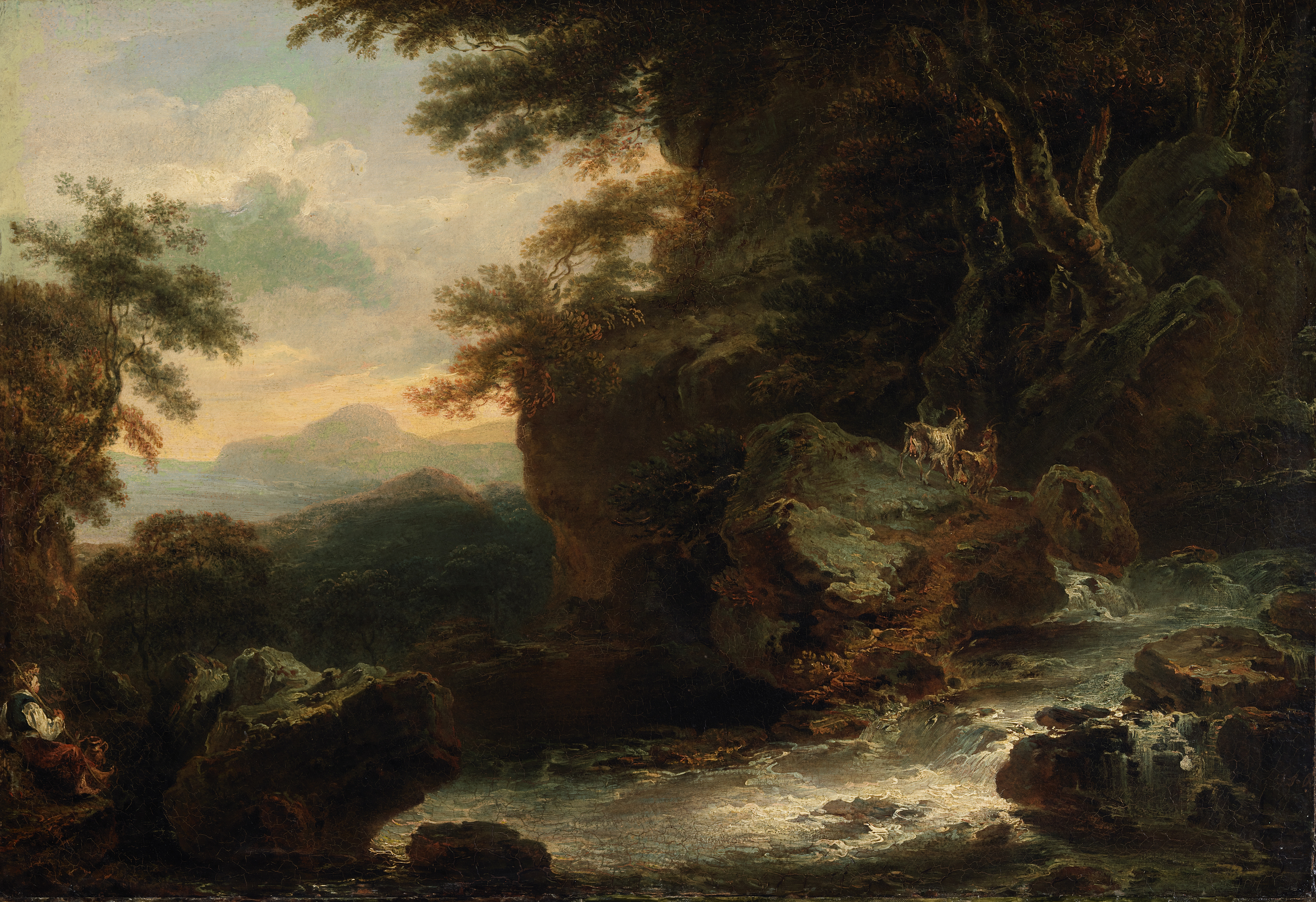
Landscape (circa 1800) by Roberts, held in the National Gallery of Ireland

Roberts initially trained as an architect, articled to master of the architectural drawing school of the Dublin Society, Thomas Ivory. In 1777, Roberts was enrolled in the school of landscape and ornament drawing and the school of figure drawing where he won a medal for draughtsmanship in 1779. Now wanting to become an artist, he likely learnt from copying or finishing his older brother's work. His early architectural training is evident in some of his later street scenes in watercolour. Roberts divided his time between London and Dublin. He exhibited with the Royal Academy between 1789 and 1811, and in 1818, and also exhibited with the British Institution from 1807 to 1818. He was a frequent exhibitor with the Society of Artists of Ireland from 1800 with 15 works, going on to show more than 60 works between 1800 and 1810.

He held a solo exhibition at the former parliament house, Dublin, in January 1802 of watercolours under the patronage of the viceroy, Lord Hardwicke. These were drawings mostly of County Wicklow for an unrealised project: Illustrations of the chief sites, rivers and picturesque scenery of the kingdom of Ireland. At this point he had issued 12 aquatints for this project between 1795 and 1799. Following this exhibition, Roberts focused on oil painting. His work strongly resembled his older brothers, which has led to disputes over attribution. His work is considered less delicate, with his paints applied more heavily. Held in high regard by his contemporaries, he was selected as one of the first 3 members of the Royal Hibernian Academy (RHA) at its foundation in 1823. He was a close friend and collaborator with his fellow artists, William Cuming and John Comerford, with Comerford often adding figures to Roberts' landscapes.

== Death and legacy ==
In 1818, Roberts suffered a severe injury to his shoulder in a coaching accident in London. This left him unable to paint, and resulted in a severe depression. Roberts died by suicide at his home on Richmond Street, Dublin in 1826. Roberts felt neglected as a youngest child, so he left some annuities to the youngest children of his nieces and nephews.

The RHA exhibited some of his works posthumously at their first exhibition, and another 6 paintings at their 1840 show. Hannah, his widow, left 6 paintings to the RHA in her will, and these were shown in 1853. The National Gallery of Ireland hold a number of his watercolours and oils.
