= William Ashford =

English landscape painter based in Ireland (1746–1824)

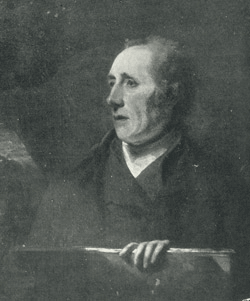
- William Ashford by William Cuming
- Born: 1746; Birmingham, England
- Died: 17 April 1824 (aged 77–78); Sandymount, Dublin
- Known for: landscape painting

William Ashford (1746 – 17 April 1824) was an English painter who worked exclusively in Ireland, where he lived from the age of 18, having initially gone there to take up a post with the Ordnance Office. His earliest paintings were flower pieces and still lifes, but from 1772 he exhibited landscapes. He became president of the Irish Society of Artists in 1813, and was first elected President of the Royal Hibernian Academy. His works include a set of views in and around Mount Merrion, painted for the 4th Earl FitzWilliam.

== Life ==
Ashford was born in Birmingham, England in 1746, baptised 20 May 1746 in St Martin's parish church. He was the son of Richard Ashford. Little is known about his education, but it is presumed he received some technical or artistic training in England. He moved to Dublin, Ireland, in 1764 at the age of eighteen after having obtained an appointment in the Ordnance Office through the influence of the Surveyor-General, Ralph Ward. His job, at least in the early years, consisted of checking on the armaments stored at forts and barracks across Ireland.

Ashford married in around 1775, although the name of his wife is unknown. The couple had two sons and one daughter. His son Daniel, also became an artist, but did not receive the same acclaim as his father. From 1792 until his death, Ashford lived at Roslyn Park in Sandymount, County Dublin, a house designed for him by the architect, James Gandon.

== Career ==
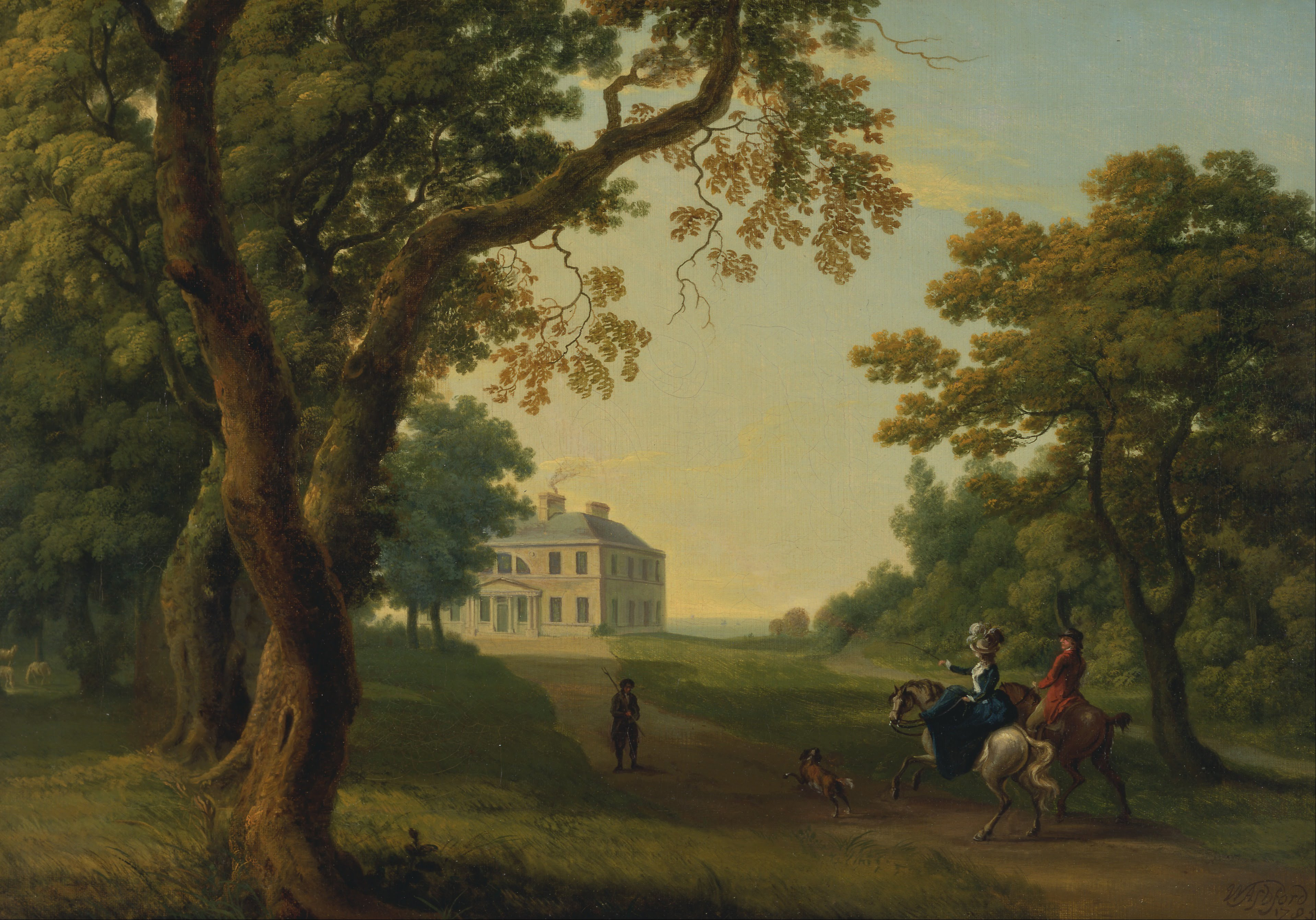
Mount Kennedy, County Wicklow, Ireland

Within three years of his arrival in Dublin, Ashford was exhibiting with the Society of Artists on William Street. He initially worked on flower paintings and still lifes, and in 1772 a landscape of his was exhibited at the Dublin Royal Society of Arts. After the death of Thomas Roberts, Ashford became the pre-eminent landscape painter in Ireland.

He was elected president of the Irish Society of Artists in 1813, and was a founding member of the Royal Hibernian Academy, becoming its first elected president in 1823.

Ashford was among the most respected landscape painters of Ireland in his time, on par with Thomas Roberts and George Barret. Institutions such as Society of Artists in Ireland, the Academy of Artists in Dublin, and the Cork Society for Promoting Fine Arts exhibited his work. He was most prolific from 1777 to 1813, selling numerous paintings at auction.

He also exhibited in England, at The Royal Academy in London from 1775 and with the Society of Artists from 1777. Despite becoming a fellow of the Society the next year, Ashford only exhibited there sporadically, works shown there including a set of views of North Wales. From 1806 he showed at the newly established British Institution. Some of his pieces seen there had been painted some years earlier, including subject pictures showing scenes from Shakespeare. Ashford lived at a number of addresses in Dublin and London, travelling back and forth exhibiting as his career progressed.

At the beginning of the 19th century – probably between 1804 and 1806 – he painted a set of landscapes in and around Mount Merrion for Lord Fitzwilliam. It was near this time that he completed his Marino Casino, one of his finest works. The Fitzwilliam commission was the last major one he received, although he continued to paint, and held an exhibition of his works in the board room of the Dublin Society's premises in 1819. In the last decade of his life he painted less, with his last known painting dated as 1821.

Ashford's work is viewed as heavily influenced by painters such as Claude Lorrain and Richard Wilson, especially in his use of a warm continental palette. Artists like James Arthur O'Connor show Ashford's influence in the Irish landscape painting genre. As well as his landscape painting, Ashford is also known for his flower paintings, with his early work painted in the Dutch style.

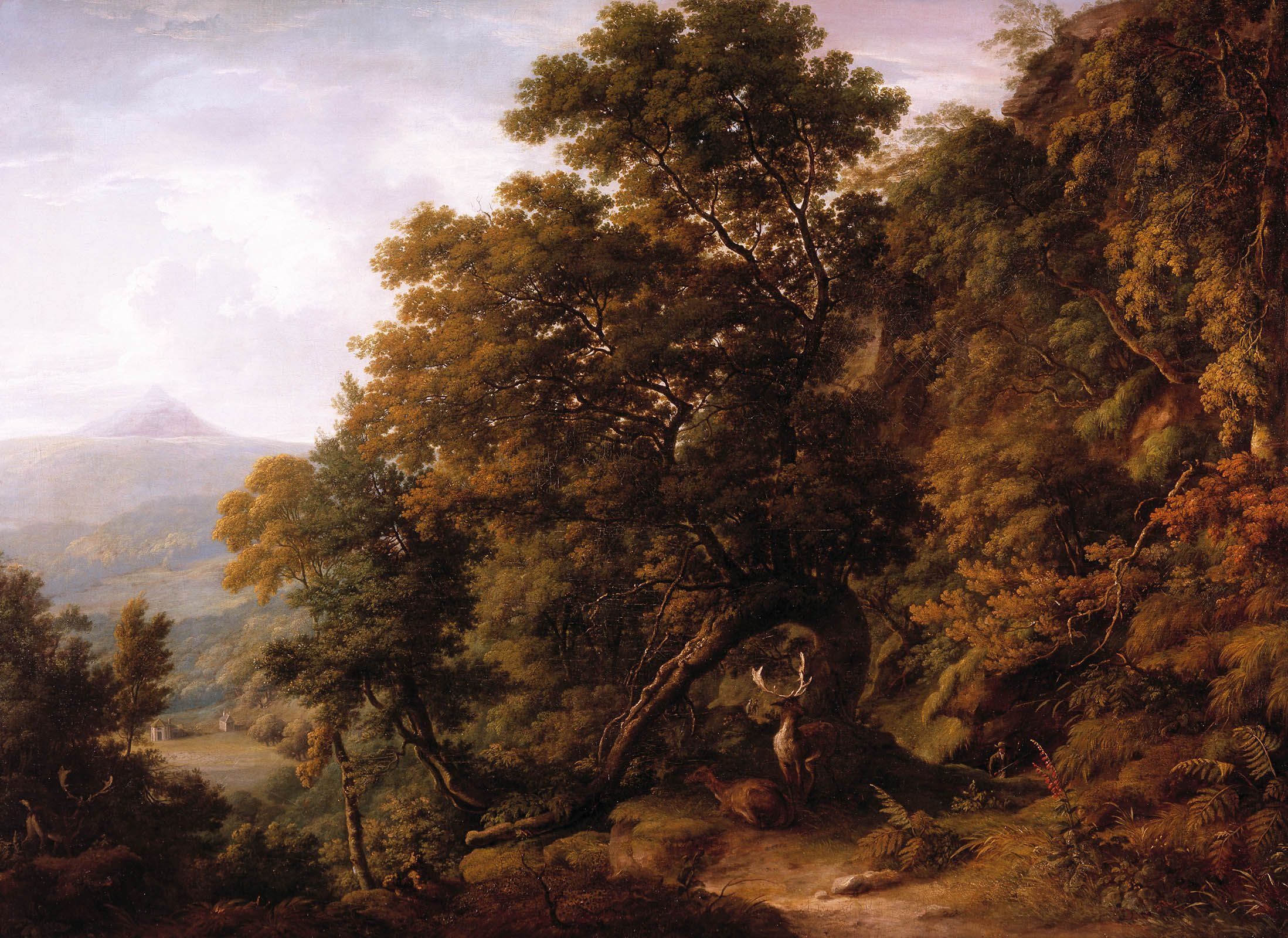
View of Powerscourt Demesne (n.d.)

== Later life and recognition ==
Ashford died on 17 April 1824 at his home.

Some of his works are held in the:

National Gallery of Ireland

Yale Center for British Art, New Haven, Connecticut, US - exhibiting 'Mount Kennedy, County Wicklow, Ireland', painted in 1785 at Mount Kennedy, home of the Gun-Cuninghame Family.

Denver Art Museum, Denver, Colorado, US - exhibiting 'View of Powerscourt Demesne', painted in 1789 on the grounds of the Powerscourt Estate, home of the Wingfield Family.

Fitzwilliam Museum, University of Cambridge, England.

In January 2008, three paintings by Ashford were donated to the Irish Heritage Trust by a Cork business family, the McCarthys.

== Ashworth's House ==
William Ashford is believed to have commissioned his friend, the architect James Gandon to build him a residence at Lord Merrions's brickfields close to the sea near Dublin, called Laburnum Lodge. Ashford had worked extensively for Lord Merrion and his family. The house was built in 1788 and 1789 as a five bay villa style house with an attic over the front door.The house is on two floors, main floor and basement.
