= John Roberts (architect) =

18th-century Irish architect

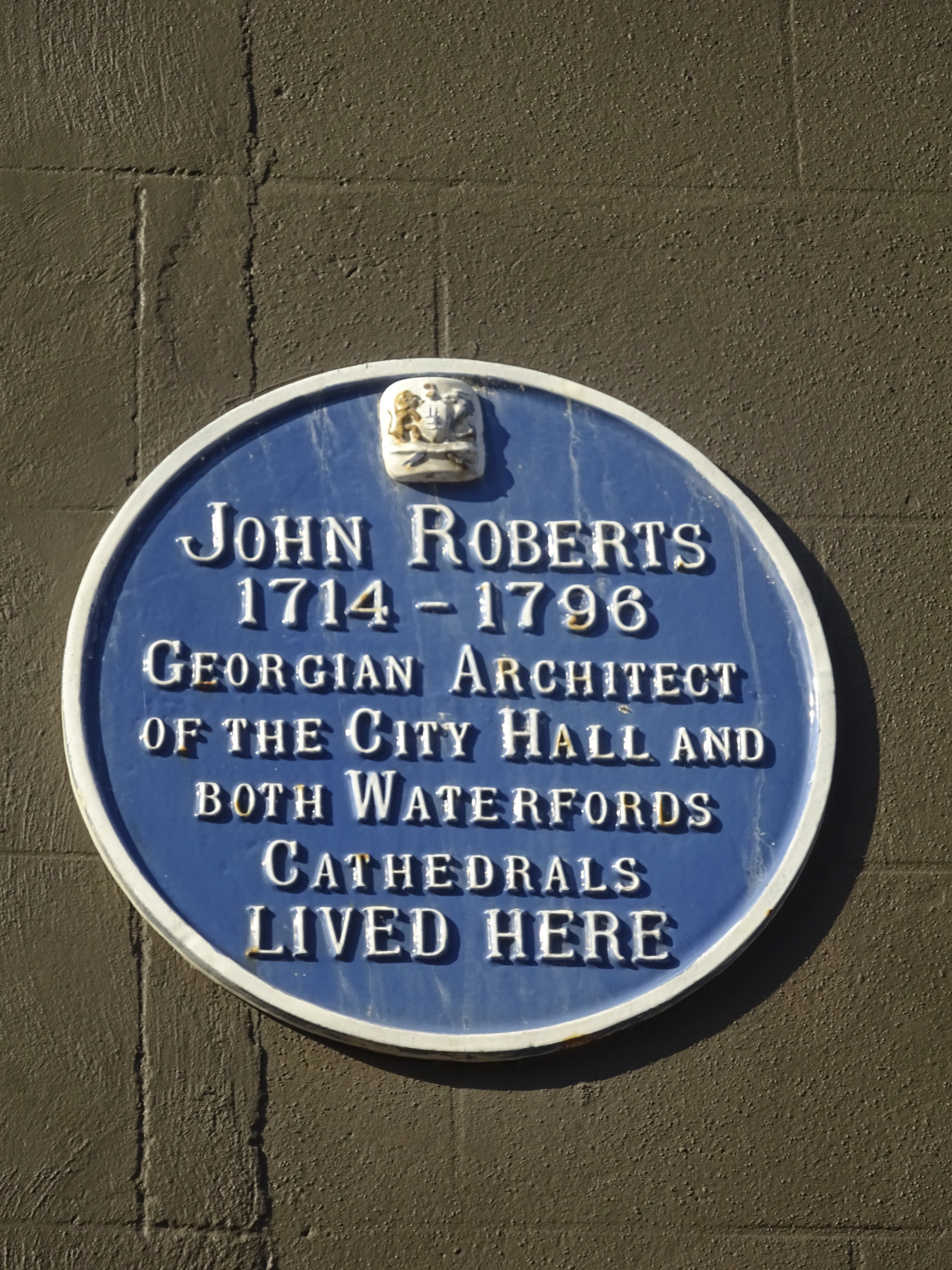
- Blue plaque in Waterford
- Born: 1712 or 1714; Waterford, Ireland
- Died: 23 May 1796 (age about 83); Waterford, Ireland
- Resting place: French Church, Waterford
- Occupation: Architect
- Movement: Georgian architecture
- Spouse: Mary Susannah Sautelle
- Children: 21–24, including Thomas Roberts and Thomas Sautelle Roberts

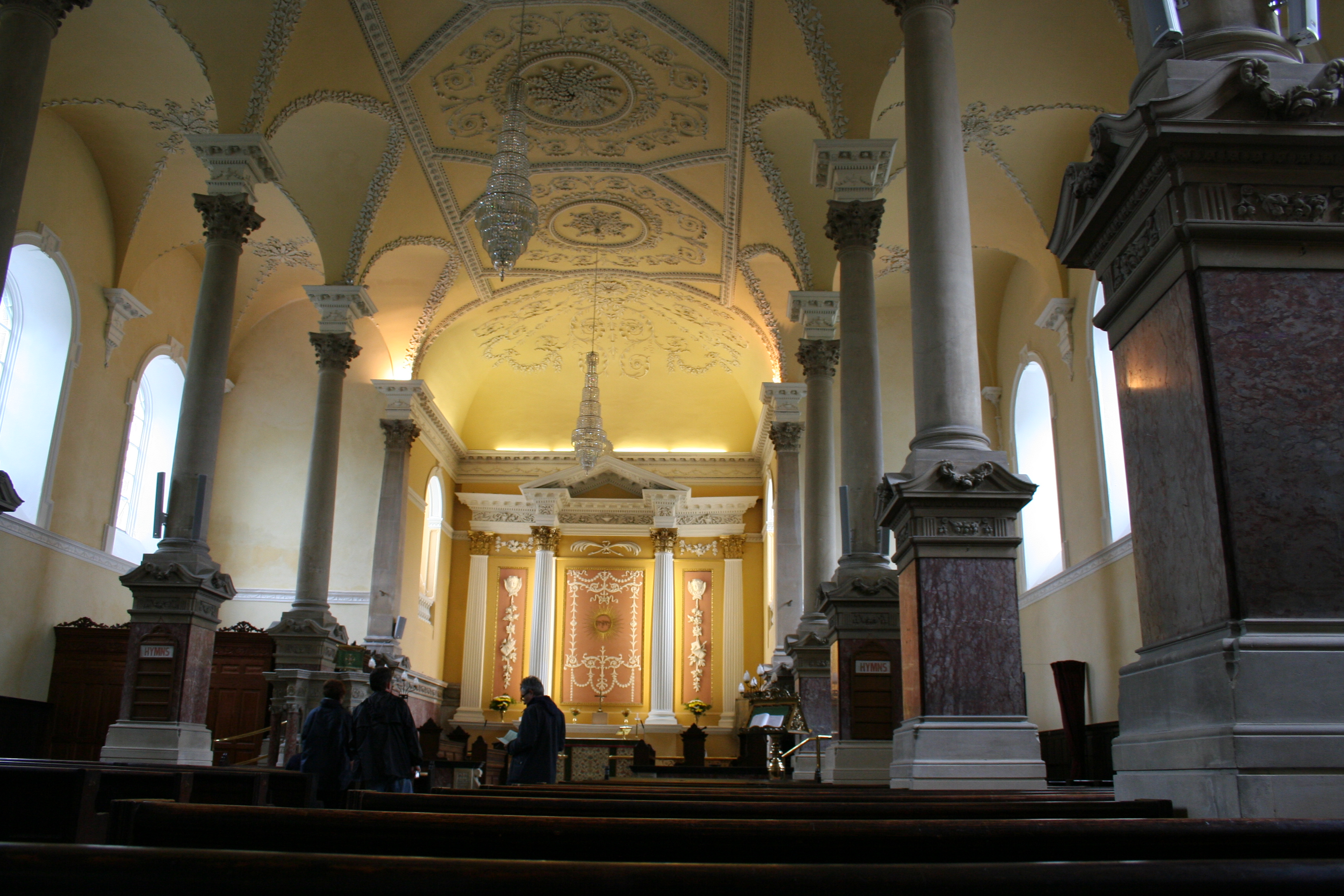
Christ Church Cathedral, Waterford, interior

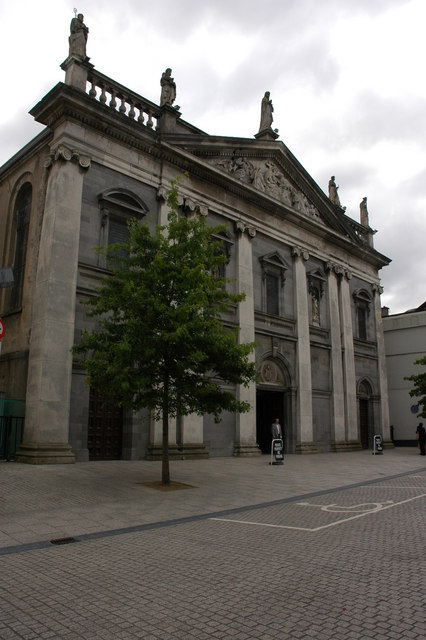
Cathedral of the Most Holy Trinity, Waterford, facade

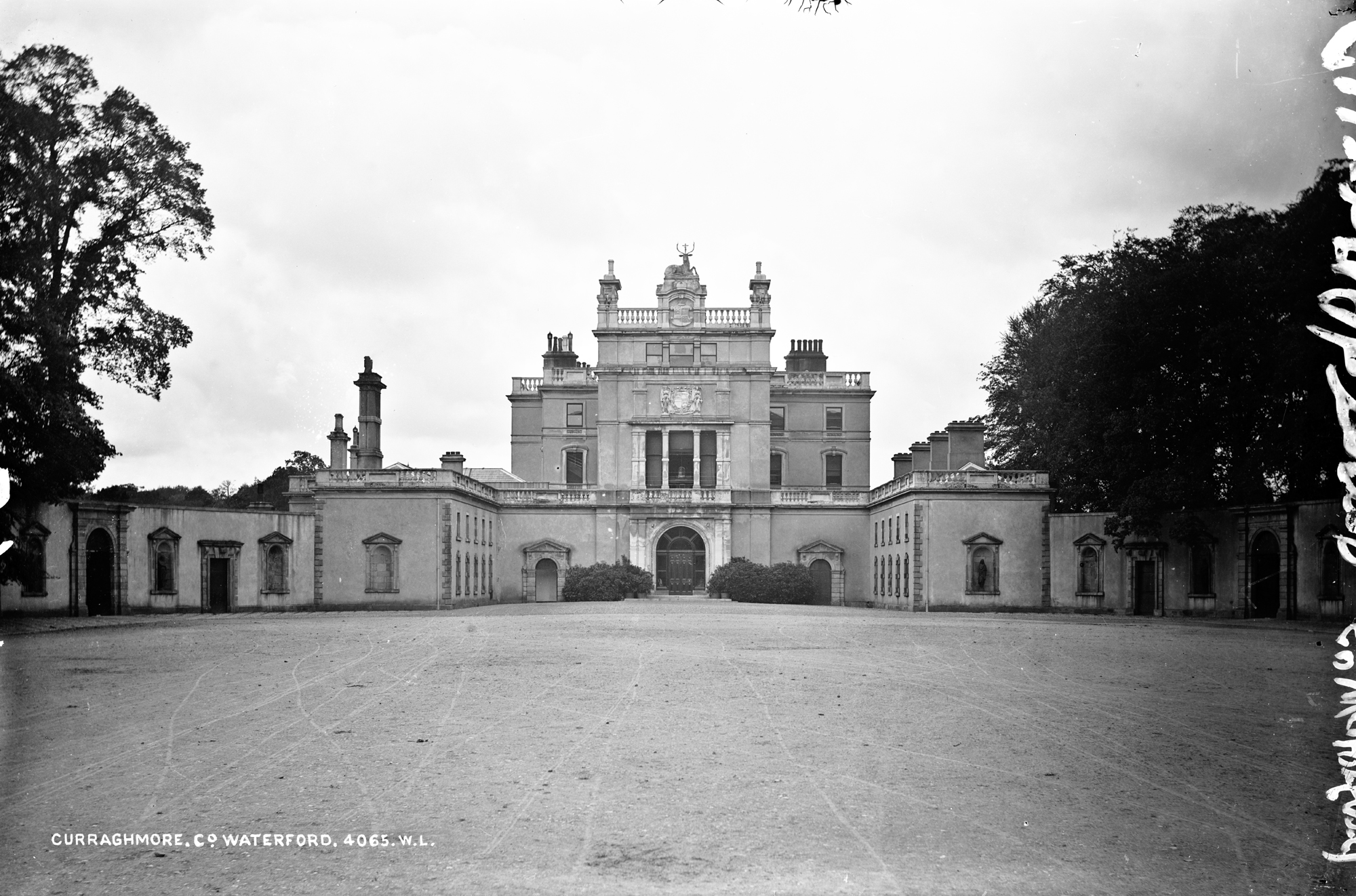
Curraghmore, near to Portlaw

John Roberts (1712/1714 – 23 May 1796) was an Irish architect of the 18th century, working in the Georgian style. Born in the city of Waterford, he is best known for the buildings he designed in that city.

== Early life ==
Roberts was born in Waterford in 1712 or 1714, son of Thomas Roberts, an architect and builder. Little is known of his early life, although John Roberts may have trained in London for a time. At 17, he eloped with Mary Susannah Sautelle, a Huguenot heiress who also lived in Waterford.

== Career ==
In 1746 John Roberts was asked by the Church of Ireland (Protestant) Bishop of Waterford and Lismore, Richard Chenevix, to complete the new Bishop's Palace.

Around 1760 he designed Mount Congreve, near Kilmeaden.

In 1785 he built a house in Waterford for William Morris, now the Harbour Commissioners’ headquarters and the Chamber of Commerce. In 1786 he designed Newtown House, later Newtown School, a Quaker school. In 1787 he designed The Leper Hospital and Church of St. Stephen. Roberts also built the Assembly Rooms on Waterford's Mall in 1788, which is now the Theatre Royal and City Hall.

Roberts had the unusual distinction of designing both the Protestant and Catholic cathedrals of Waterford: Christ Church Cathedral (1770s) and the Cathedral of the Most Holy Trinity (1790s) respectively.

Outside of Waterford, he designed Curraghmore and Mount Congreve (both in County Waterford), St Iberius' Church (Wexford town) and is reputed to have designed Tyrone House (County Galway), Cappoquin House (County Waterford) and Moore Hall, County Mayo.

== Personal life ==
Roberts had between 21 and 24 children with his wife Susannah, of whom eight lived to adulthood, including the painters Thomas Roberts and Thomas Sautelle Roberts. They lived for many years in the old bishop's palace, opposite the cathedral, with a country residence at Roberts Mount. He was nicknamed "Honest John" because he paid his workers so reliably, sometimes giving half their pay directly to their wives so that it would not be wasted on alcohol.

John Roberts died in 1796 after falling asleep on the floor of the Cathedral of the Most Holy Trinity, Waterford and contracting pneumonia. The main square in Waterford is named John Roberts Square in his honour.

His son, the Reverend John Roberts became a magistrate and rector; the Rev. John's son was Abraham Roberts, a general in the East India Company, and Abraham's son was Frederick Roberts, 1st Earl Roberts, a First World War field marshal. Roberts' sons Thomas and Sautelle became artists, as did his daughter, who painted scenery for the Waterford Theatre and landscapes.

Another great-grandson was the architect Samuel Ussher Roberts (1821–1900).
