= Lisheen Castle =

Restored castellated country house in County Tipperary, Ireland

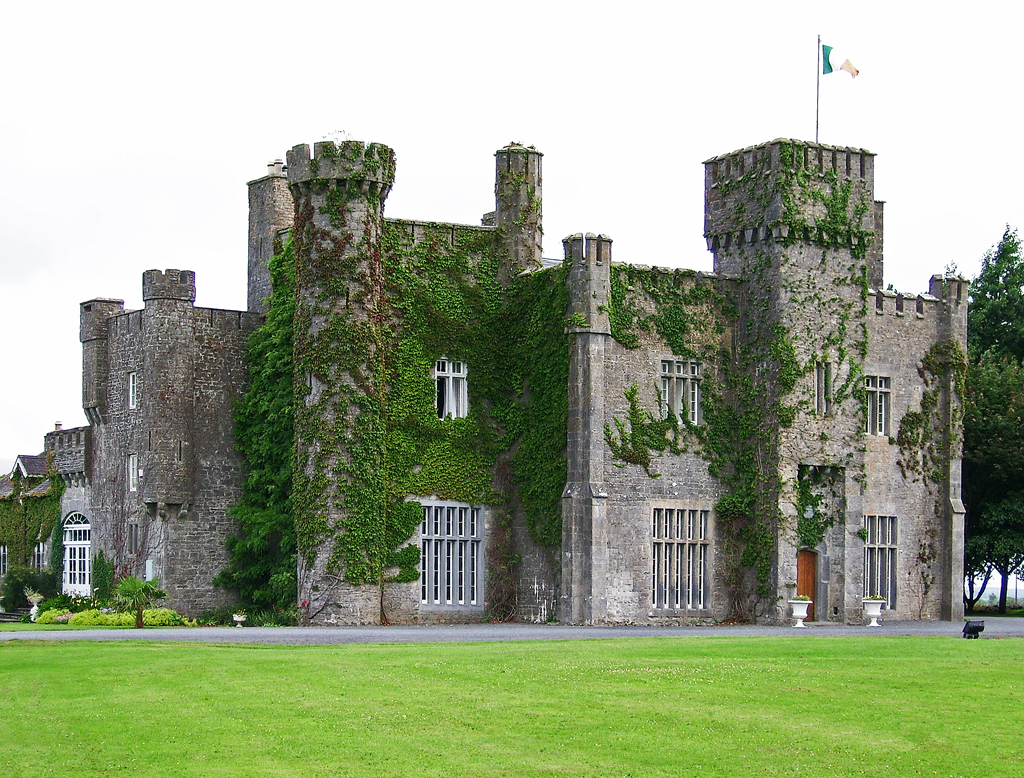
Lisheen Castle

Lisheen Castle is an 18th-century building in Thurles, County Tipperary, Ireland. It was originally a three storey Irish Palladian country house with castle features being added in the early 19th- century. It was damaged in an arson attack by the IRA in 1921, during the Irish War of Independence, and disused for eighty years before being bought in 1994 and restored.

== See also ==
- Judkin-Fitzgerald Baronets
- Richard John Uniacke
