= Cappoquin House =

Mansion in County Waterford, Ireland

Coordinates: 52.149°N 7.850°W

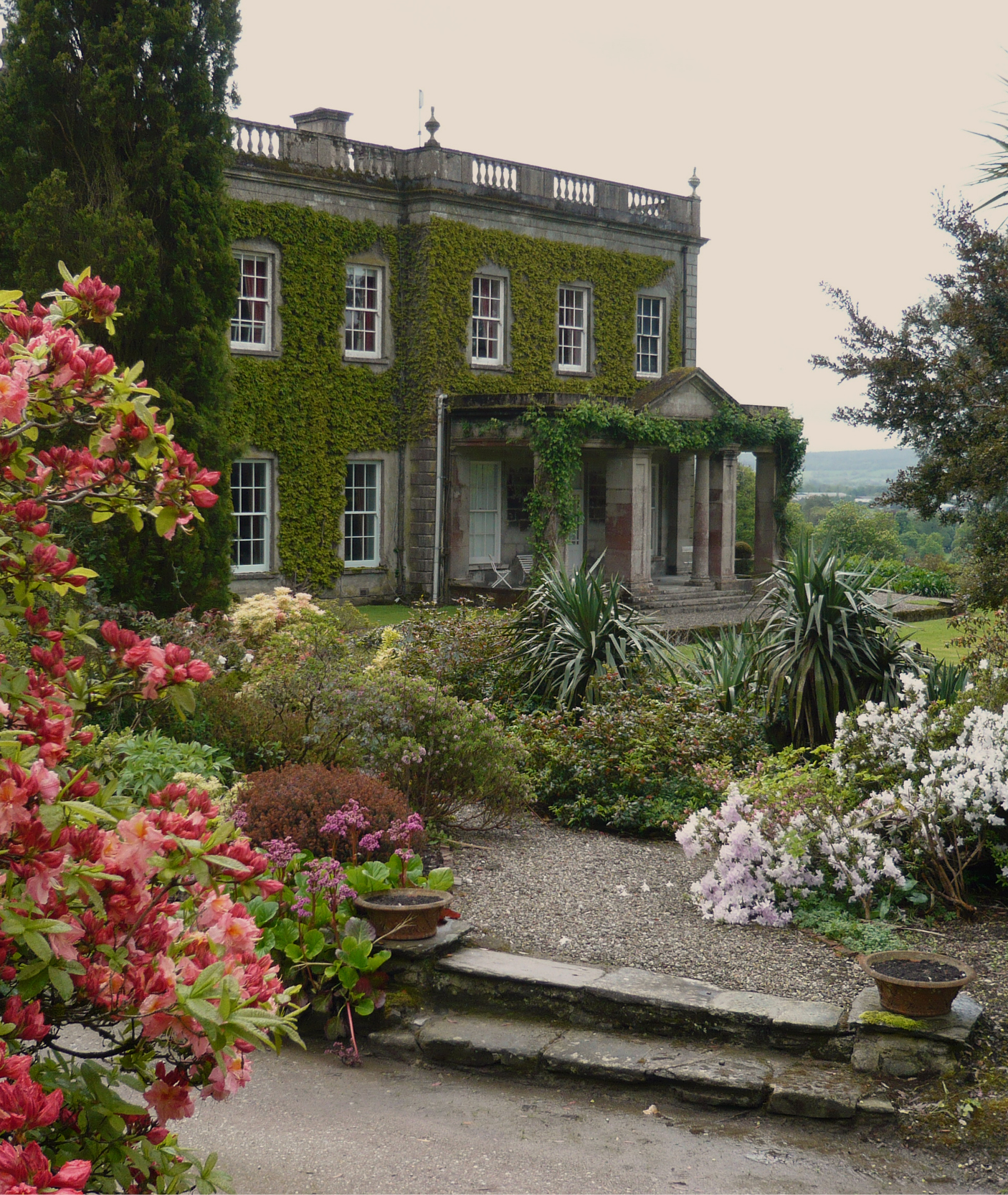
Cappoquin House Garden

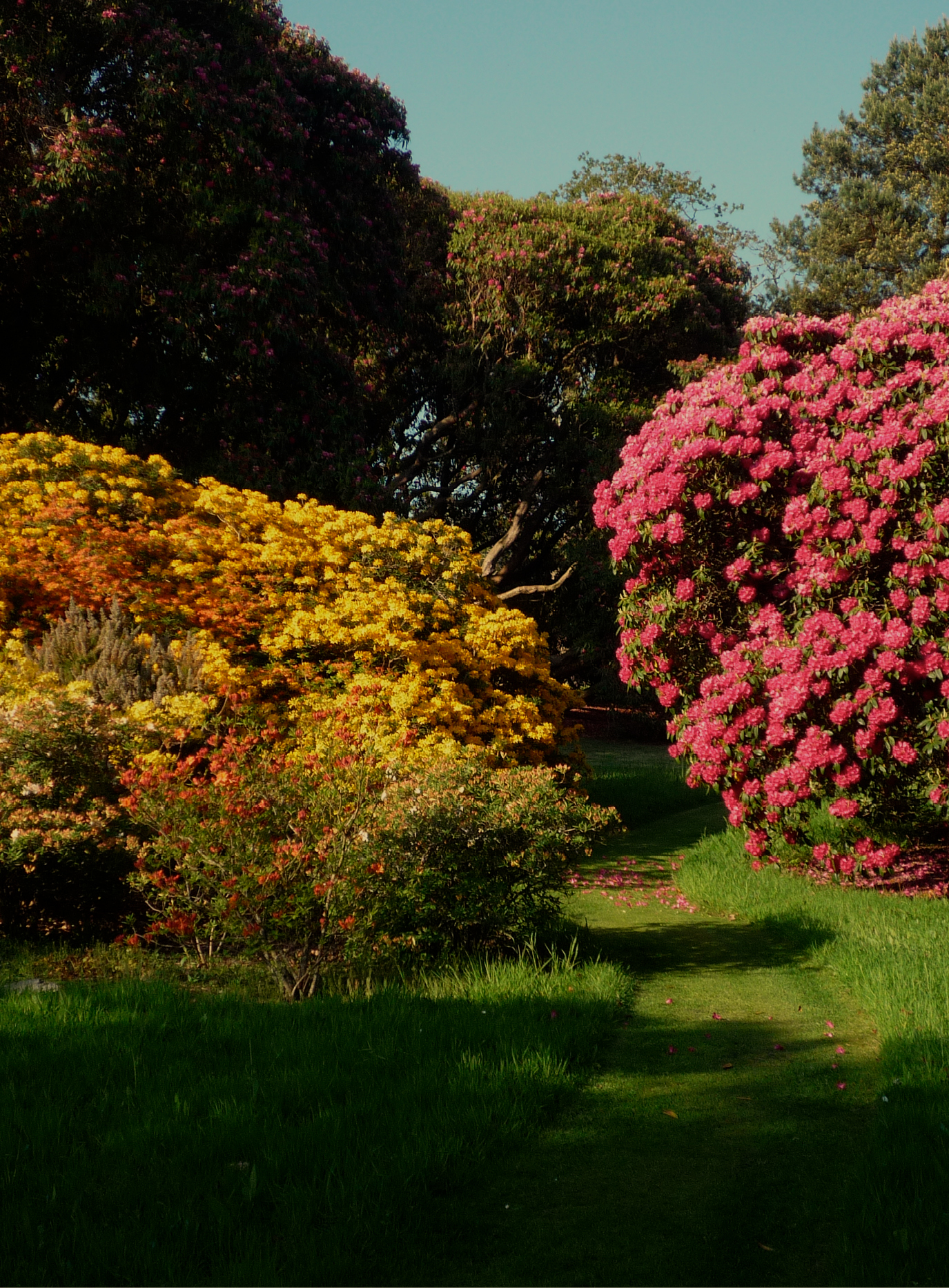
Rhododendrons in Cappoquin House Garden

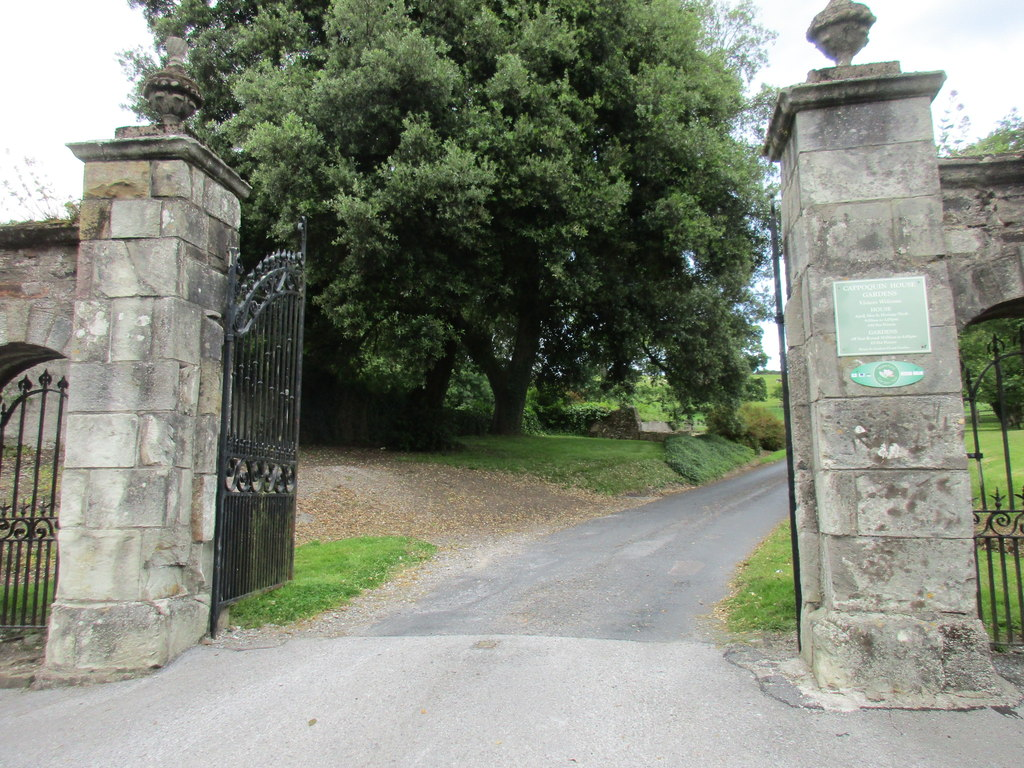
Entrance gates to Cappoquin House

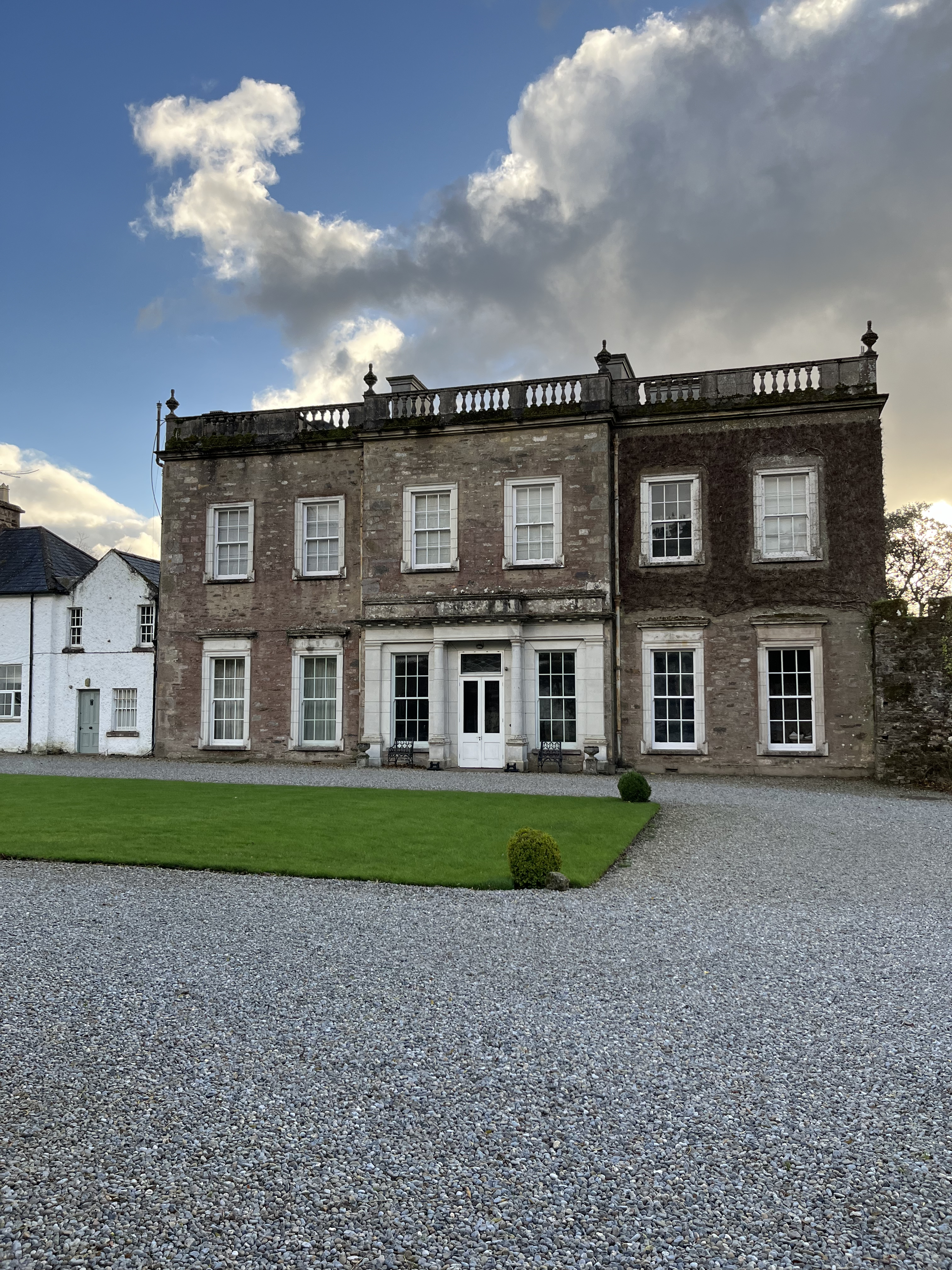
Cappoquin House front

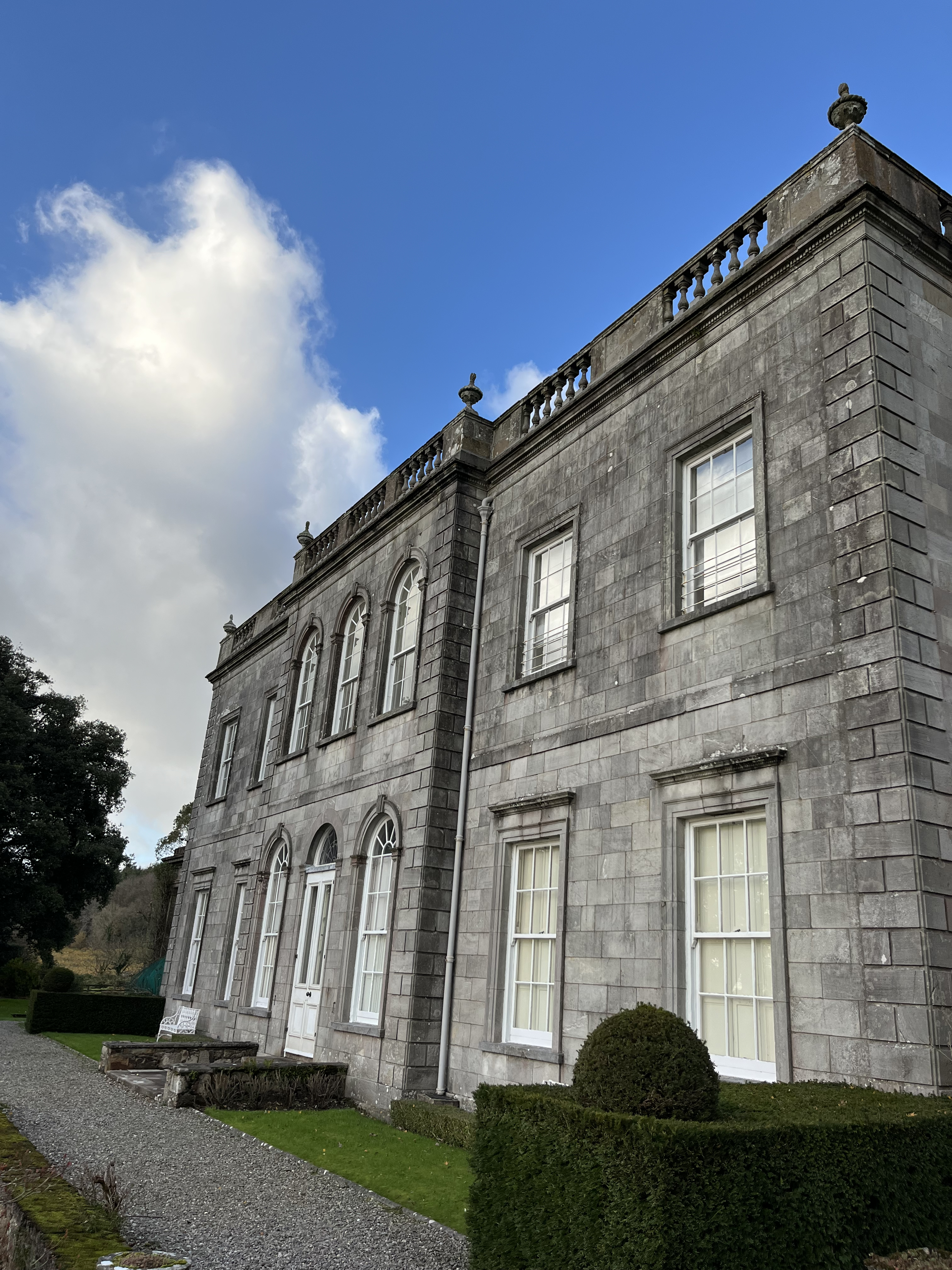
Cappoquin House rear

Cappoquin House also known as Belmont is an 18th-century classical-style mansion overlooking the town of Cappoquin in County Waterford, Ireland. The house is the seat of the Keane Baronets of Belmont and of Cappoquin.

== Previous castle ==
It is believed that the house was built on the site of an old Fitzgerald castle, of which the earliest known reference dates to 1598 when it was occupied by a Mr. Hayles and razed by Thomas Fitzgerald of Cappagh, who had probably forfeited it in the Desmond Rebellions. In 1641 Capt. Hugh Croker on behalf of the Earl of Cork occupied the castle, and successfully resisted an assault by the Confederate Catholics under General Purcell in 1643. However, it surrendered to Lord Castlehaven in 1645. It was subsequently captured by Cromwell in 1649. Nothing remained of the castle, apart from one wall with a narrow doorway leading to a garden when it was surveyed in 1918.

== Current house ==
The current house was built in 1779. It is believed to have been designed by John Roberts, a noted Waterford architect. The building is a detached seven-bay two-storey over basement house surrounded by notable formal gardens and landscaped grounds which are open to the public.

The house was burnt out on 19 February 1923 during the Civil War, but Sir John Keane, whose family had owned the house for generations, fully restored it as economically as possible using recycled materials and direct labour. He built a flat concrete roof using a technique developed by James Hardress de Warrenne Waller known as Nofrango. In November 1973 during a dispute with tenants over ground rents, a milking parlour on the estate was destroyed by a 50 lb (23 kg) bomb. The Official IRA were believed to be responsible.

== Gardens ==
The landscaped gardens are the work of Lady Olivia Keane who, after years of neglect following World War II, designed the grounds. There are some fine trees, Japanese cedars, maples and a southern beech, and a venerable oak that is included in Owen Johnson's Champion Trees of Britain and Ireland. Higher on the slopes are terraces with rhododendrons, azaleas, camellias and magnolias, and everywhere, fine views over the surrounding countryside.

== Visitor accommodation ==
Since 2023 Cappoquin Estate has offered limited self-catering accommodation for guests, managed by Cappoquin Estate Hospitality:

- Farm stays – renovated 19th-century buildings on the working estate that can sleep up to eight guests and provides access to the gardens and river walks.
- The Cabin Under The Hills – an off-grid, architect-designed timber cabin for two on a hillside east of the house, with panoramic views over the Blackwater River Valley and Knockmealdown Mountains; it was listed by the Irish Examiner in 2025 among “Ireland’s most remarkable and noteworthy stays”.

Accommodation is available seasonally and is booked directly through the estate.
