= Moore Hall, County Mayo =

Moore Hall
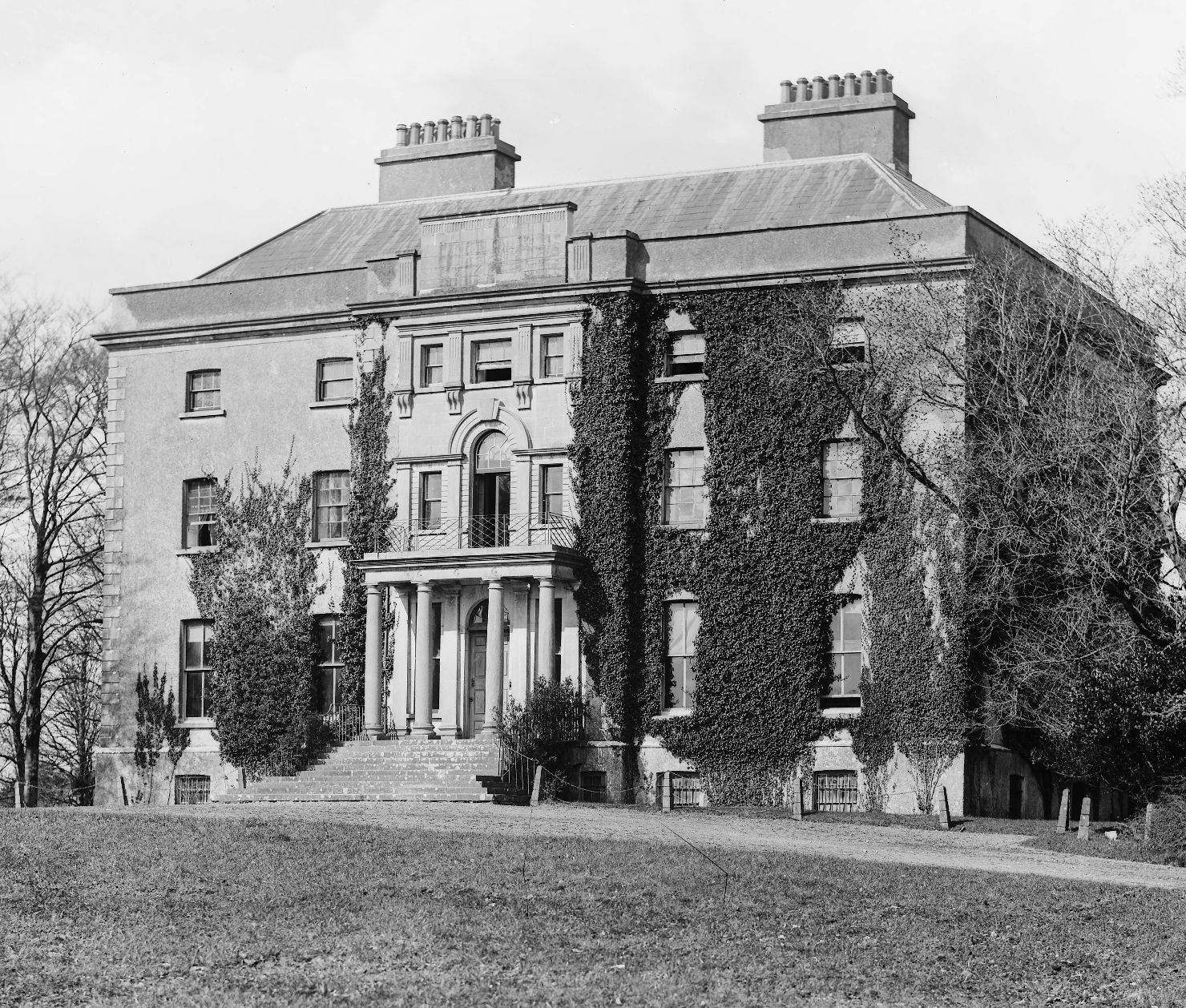
- Moore Hall, c. 1880s
- Interactive map of Moore Hall

General information
- Status: Derelict
- Architectural style: Georgian
- Location: County Mayo, Ireland
- Coordinates: 53.7134°N 9.2264°W
- Estimated completion: 1795
- Destroyed: 1923

Technical details
- Floor count: 3 over part-raised basement

Design and construction
- Architect: John Roberts

Moore Hall is a ruined 18th-century manor house located near Carnacon in County Mayo, Ireland. Built around 1792, it became the ancestral home of the Moore family, including the novelist George Augustus Moore. The house was burned during the Irish Civil War in 1923 and remains a ruin. The surrounding forested estate is now managed by Coillte as a public amenity, while the house and parts of the former estate are owned by Mayo County Council.

== History ==
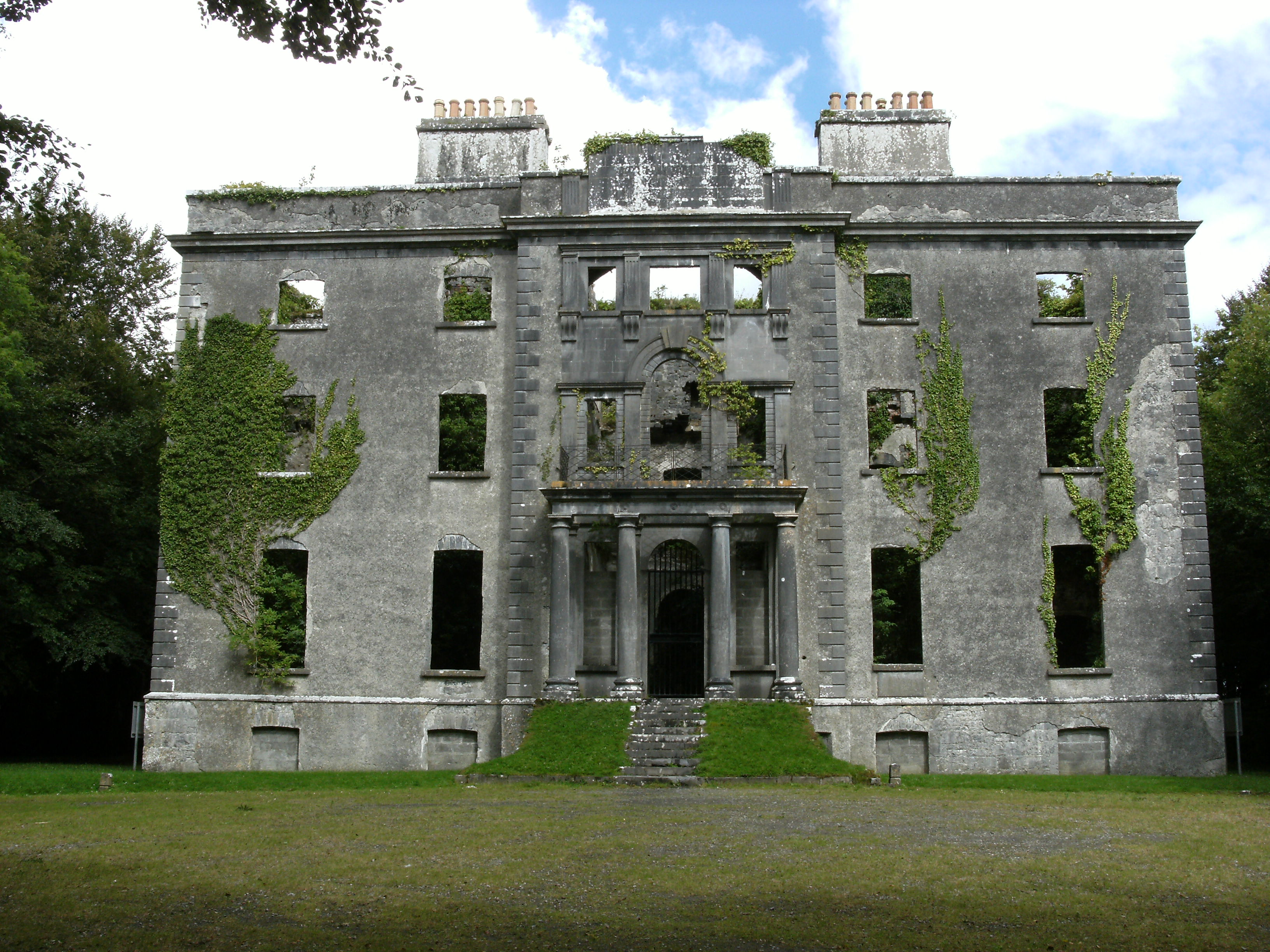
Ruined facade of Moore Hall in 2010

Built for the Moore family, who had purchased land in the area in the early 1790s, Moore Hall was completed between c. 1792 and 1795. The house was commissioned by the wine merchant George Moore (1727–1799) and built to the designs of the architect John Roberts. The Georgian house had three-storeys (over a part-raised basement) and was five bays wide and three bays deep. The front elevation's design features a full-height breakfront with a Doric portico on the groundfloor.

Used as their primary residence until the early 20th century, members of the Moore family associated with the estate include John Moore (1763–1799), the politician George Henry Moore (1810–1870), writer George Augustus Moore (1852–1933) and soldier and senator Maurice George Moore (1854–1939).

The house was vacant by 1921 and was burned down in 1923 during the Irish Civil War. It was burned by the Anti-Treaty Irish Republican Army, during a period in which a number of other Irish country houses were destroyed, as the then owner and Irish Free State Senator, Maurice George Moore, was perceived to hold a Pro-Treaty stance.

The Moore Hall estate ultimately came into the ownership of the state, with the forested areas managed by Coillte. In January 2018, Mayo County Council announced, that it had acquired parts of the estate, including the ruined 18th-century house and approximately 80 acres of woodland. As of 2023, Coillte reportedly retained ownership of 300 acres at Moore Hall. In March 2023, Mayo County Council, in conjunction with Coillte and the National Parks and Wildlife Service, published a "draft masterplan" for the proposed redevelopment of the house and lands.
