= Margaret Bryan (philosopher) =

British natural philosopher and educator (c. 1759–1836)

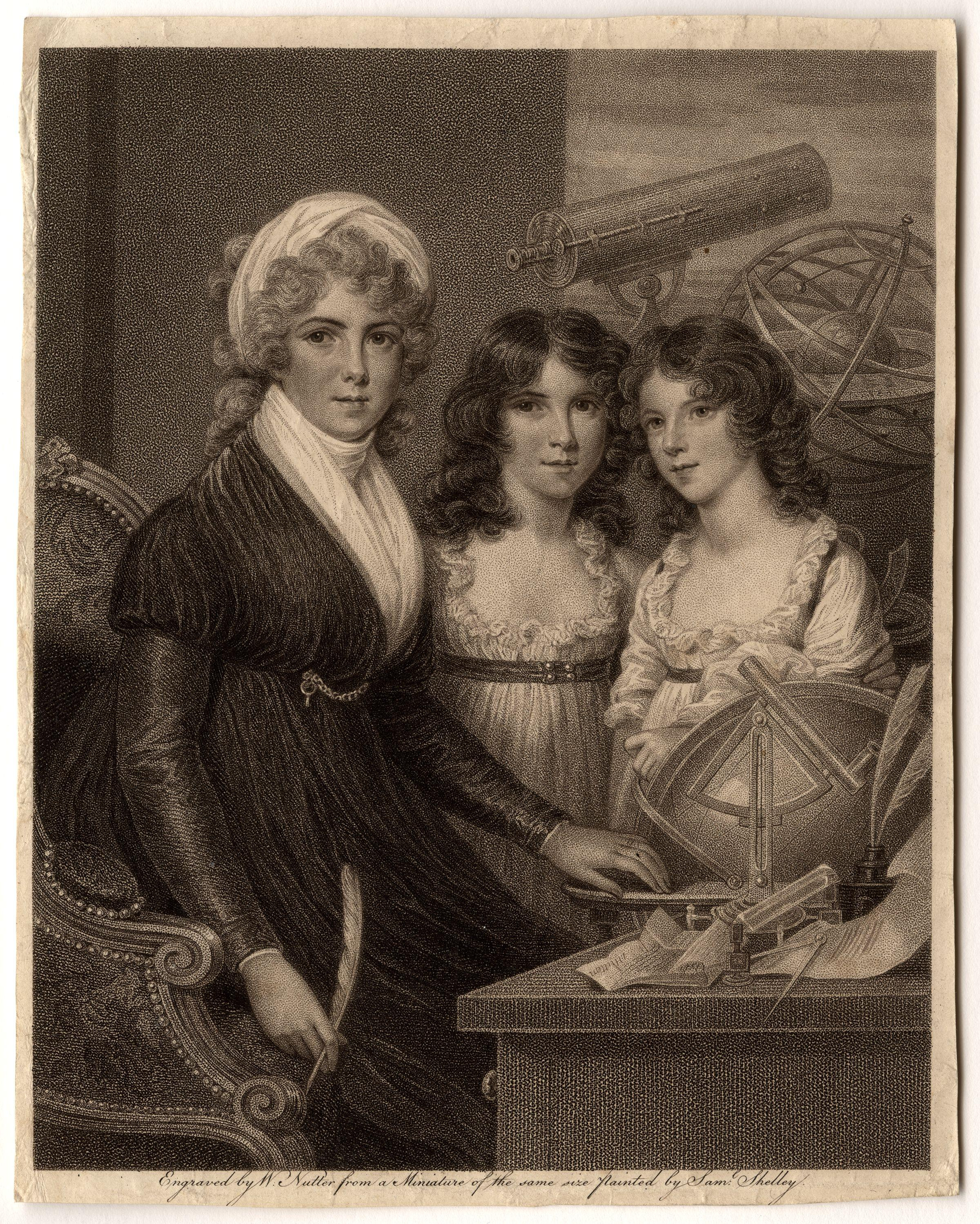
- Engraving of Bryan and her two daughters Ann Marian (center) and Sarah Maria (right)
- Born: 12 October 1759 (baptism date); West Ham, Essex, England
- Died: 31 March 1836; Kentish Town, London, England
- Burial place: St Luke’s Church, Chelsea, London, England
- Occupations: Natural philosopher and educator
- Years active: 1791–1816

Margaret Bryan (c. 1759 – 31 March 1836) was an English natural philosopher and educator and the author of three scientific textbooks. A pioneer of female education, she taught science to women and girls from her schools in Margate and London. The first 'Bryan House' school was in Margate, Kent above the yet-to-be-discovered Margate Caves, and the second was in Blackheath, London. Margaret also later offered private tuition from Cadogan Place in Chelsea. Her first known work was A Compendious System of Astronomy (1797), collecting her lectures on astronomy. She later published Lectures on Natural Philosophy (1806), a textbook on the fundamentals of physics and astronomy, and An Astronomical and Geographical Class Book for the Use of Schools and Private Families, a thin octavo, in 1815.

== Life ==
Although some unverified speculations appeared in 2021, personal information about Margaret Bryan was discovered when genealogical research published in 2023 uncovered many details about her life and family. Further biographical research published in 2024 revealed extensive information about the lives of Margaret, her husband William, and her two daughters, Anne Marian and Sarah Maria.

Baptized on 12 October 1759 in West Ham, Essex, Margaret was the daughter of textile merchant Oswald Haverkam and Sarah (née Wall), whose father was an apothecary. Margaret’s mother, Sarah, died in 1764, and Margaret and her siblings were put under the care of her uncle Thomas Nottidge and a second guardian, Joseph Green. Margaret's father, Oswald, remarried in 1769 and died in 1781. Margaret, then living in Chigwell, married William Bryan, a merchant, in London on 12 July 1783. They had two children, Anne Marian and Sarah Maria.

William Bryan died in Cork, Ireland, on 11 September 1788 when Margaret was around 29. Soon after, Margaret moved to Margate and opened her first boarding school for young ladies, Bryan House, in 1791. In 1797, she published her first book A Compendious System of Astronomy in a Course of Familiar Lectures by subscription followed by a second edition in 1799 and a third in 1804. In 1798, the school was listed for sale, and by 1800, Margaret had opened a new Bryan House school in Blackheath, close to the Royal Observatory, Greenwich. Nevil Maskelyne, the Astronomer Royal, was a subscriber to her book. During her time in Blackheath, Margaret was consulted on the production of an astronomy-themed board game Science in Sport, or the Pleasures of Astronomy and in 1806, she published her second book, Lectures on Natural Philosophy. The book was not as well received as her first and in 1807 Margaret sold her school in Blackheath and moved to 1 Gloucester Place, London. In 1813 she planned to deliver lectures to the public from her home in Bath and at the Argyll rooms in central London, though these were cancelled due to personal misfortune. Margaret published her third book An Astronomical and Geographical Class Book for the Use of Schools and Private Families to critical acclaim in 1815 at which time she was offering private tuition from 27 Lower Cadogan Place, London.

Margaret's daughters were both accomplished musicians who taught lessons on the harp and pianoforte. Her eldest daughter, Anne Marian, died on 11 August 1833, aged around 48 and is buried at St. Luke's Church, Chelsea. Margaret Bryan died with dementia on 31 March 1836 at a property on Fortess Terrace in Kentish Town, London and is also buried at St. Luke's Church. Margaret's youngest daughter, Sarah Maria, died on 25 November 1852, aged around 63, in Ipswich, Suffolk. Neither daughters chose to marry or have children.

=== Publications ===
Bryan's published works are dated 1797 to 1815.

In 1797 Bryan published in quarto, by subscription, a Compendious System of Astronomy, with a portrait of herself and two daughters as a frontispiece, the whole engraved by William Nutter from a miniature by Samuel Shelley. She dedicated her book to her pupils. The lectures of which the book consisted had been praised by Charles Hutton, then at Royal Military Academy, Woolwich. An octavo edition of the work was issued later. The Critical Review printed her reply to what she saw as a damaging article in that journal.

In 1806 Bryan published, also by subscription, and in quarto, Lectures on Natural Philosophy (thirteen lectures on hydrostatics, optics, pneumatics, and acoustics), with a portrait of the author, engraved by Heath, after a painting by T. Kearsley; and there is a notice in it that "Mrs. Bryan educates young ladies at Blackheath." In 1815 Bryan produced an Astronomical and Geographical Class Book for Schools for the Use of Schools and Private Families, a thin octavo. The lectures had been previously available only to noblemen, educators, and booksellers. The text was supplemented with diagrams as well as portions for exercises. She described the mechanics of the air rifle, the hot air balloon, the diving bell, as well as works of Isaac Newton, Galileo, and Benjamin Franklin, including the latter's experiments with lightning.

Conversations on Chemistry, published anonymously in 1806, is also ascribed to her by Watt and in the Biographical Dictionary of Living Authors (1816), but is in fact a book by Jane Marcet.

== See also ==
- Timeline of women in science
