= George Robson =

George Robson may refer to:

- George Robson (racing driver) (1909–1946), English-American auto racer, winner of the Indianapolis 500 in 1946
- George Robson (rugby union) (born 1985), English rugby union player
- George Fennell Robson (1788–1833), English painter
- George Robson (footballer, born 1905) (1905–1982), English footballer
- George Robson (footballer, born 1897) (1897–1984), English footballer
