= Samuel Shelley =

English painter

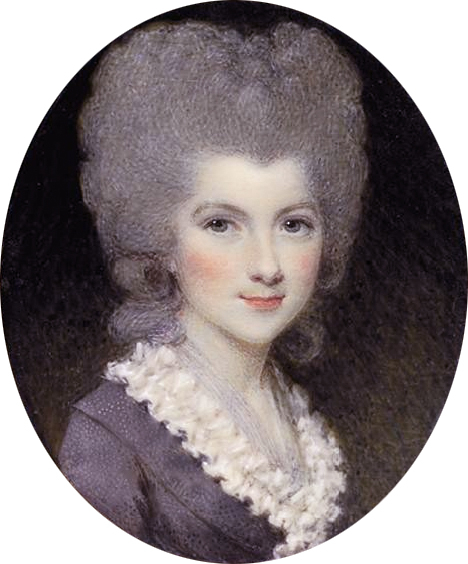
Lady Lavinia Bingham, Countess Spencer by Samuel Shelley, 1780

Samuel Shelley (1750/56–22 December 1808) was an English miniaturist and watercolour painter.

Largely self-educated, Samuel Shelley was a leading miniaturist, i.e., painter of portrait miniatures, of his time, ranking with Cosway, Smart, and Crosse. In addition to his portraits, he also painted in water-colours fancy figures and compositions from Shakespeare, Tasso, and other poets. His water-colours and miniatures were engraved by Bartolozzi, William Nutter, Caroline Watson, and others.

== Life ==
Born in Whitechapel, London, Shelley was for the most part self-taught as an artist. His first exhibition was at the Society of Artists in 1773, on 21 March the following year he entered the Royal Academy Schools (his age recorded as 17), where he became influenced by the work of Sir Joshua Reynolds. During his career Shelley painted in oil, illustrated books, and engraved several of his own works, but he was most particularly remembered for his watercolour miniature portraits. During his lifetime he exhibited at the Royal Academy, the Society of Artists and the British Institution. In 1804 Shelley joined with W. F. Wells, Robert Hills, W. H. Pyne, and six other artists to found the Watercolour Society (afterwards known as the "Old" society), of which he was treasurer until 1807.

Shelley also taught painting, Edward Nash (miniaturist) and Alexander Robertson being two of his pupils.
