= John Laporte =

John Laporte may refer to:

- John Laporte (politician)
- John Laporte (artist)
