= George Fennell Robson =

English watercolour painter (1788-1833)

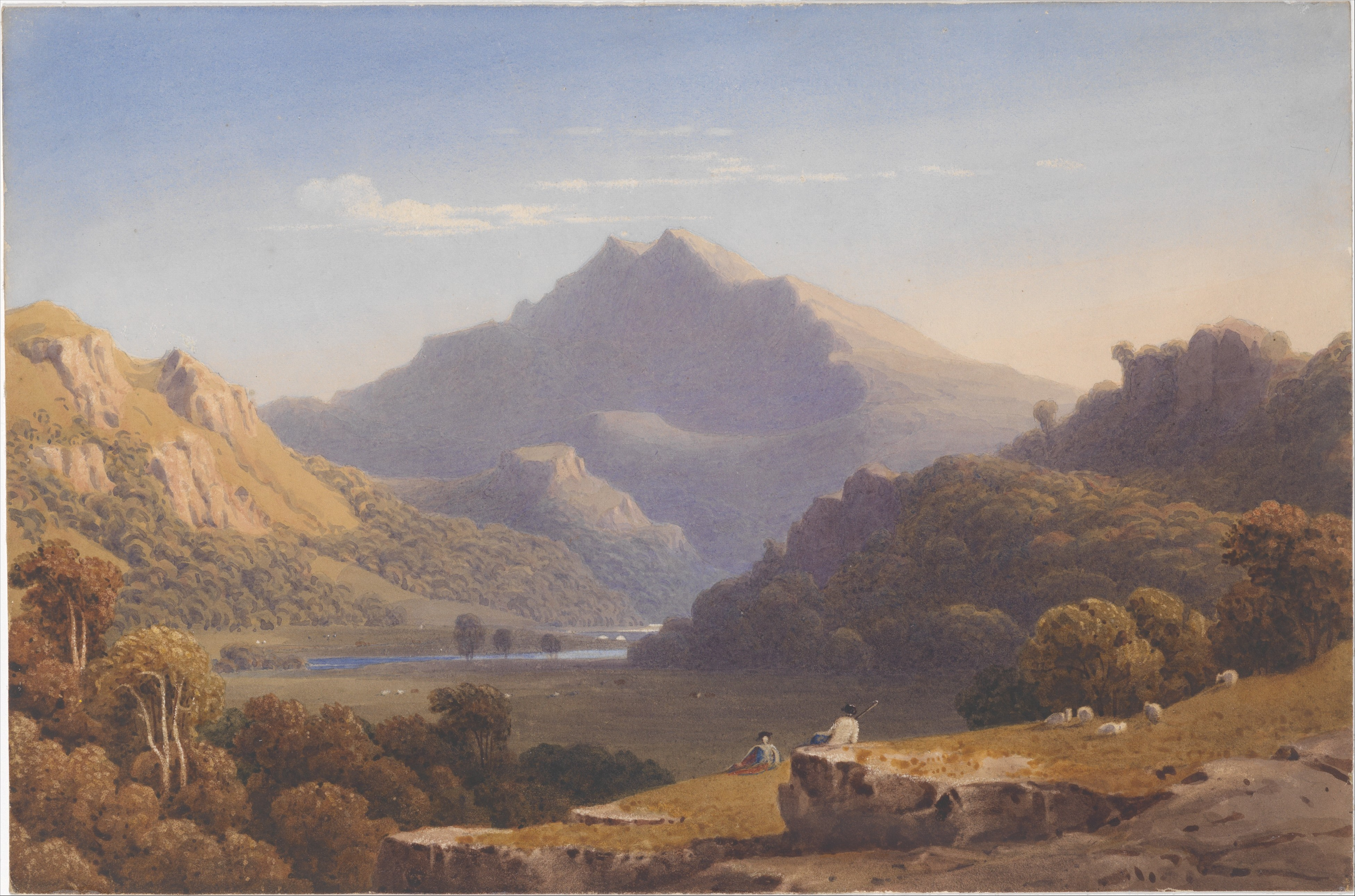
Snowdon from Llyn Nantlle

George Fennell Robson (1788–1833) was an English watercolour painter, mainly producing landscapes. His main talent was for the treatment of mountain scenery under broad effects of light and shade.

He received an unusual degree of praise from John Ruskin in the first volume of Modern Painters (1843), where most English painters are treated with scorn.

== Life ==
One of 23 children of John Robson (1739–1824) by his second wife, Charlotte, eldest daughter of George Fennell, R.N., he was born at Durham in 1788; his father, a wine merchant, was from Etterby, near Carlisle. He received instruction in drawing from a Mr. Harle of Durham. In 1806 he went to London with £5 in his pocket.

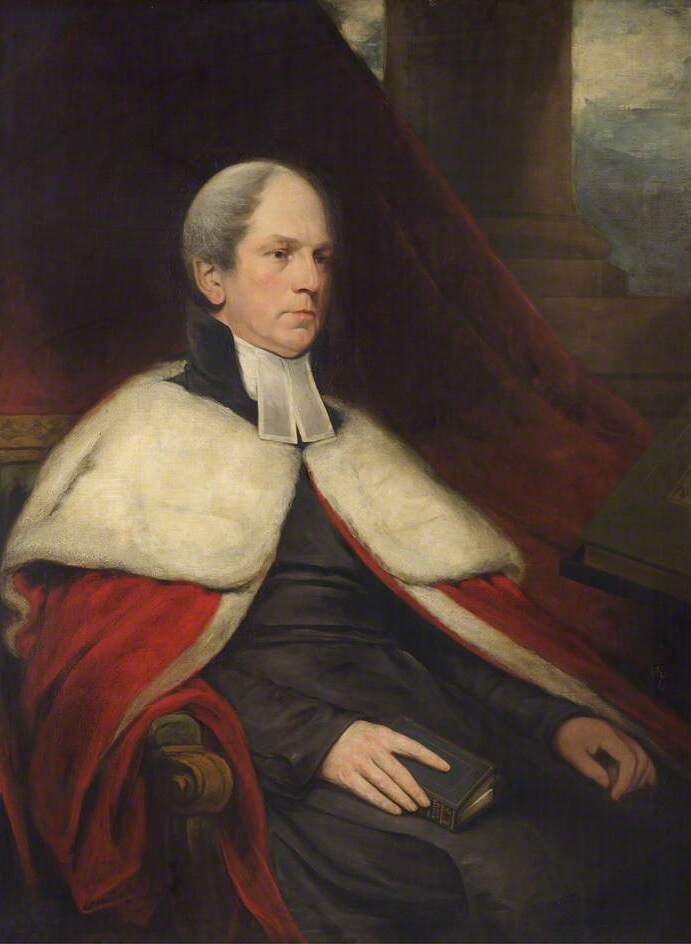
Christopher Wordsworth

Robson began to exhibit at the Royal Academy in 1807, in 1810 landscapes in the Bond Street gallery of the Associated Painters, where he was a member, and in 1813 with the Society of Painters in Oil and Watercolours. At the anniversary meeting on 30 November 1819 he was elected president of the last society, for a year.

Robson was an honorary member of the Sketching Society, but weakness of sight prevented him from drawing at their evening meetings. A meeting of the society to say farewell to Charles Robert Leslie on his departure for America was held at his house, 17 Golden Square, on Thursday, 22 August 1833. On the following Wednesday he embarked on the S.S. James Watt, to visit his friends in the north, and was at Stockton-on-Tees on the 31st, suffering from inflammation. He died at his home in London on 8 September, and was buried in the churchyard of St. Mary-le-Bow in his native city of Durham.

== Works ==
Robson published in 1808 a print of Durham, the profits of which enabled him to visit Scotland. In 1811 and 1812 he exhibited drawings of the Trossachs and Loch Katrine; and in 1814 published Scenery of the Grampians, with forty mountain landscapes, etched by Henry Morton after his drawings. From 1813 to 1820 he contributed, on the average, twenty drawings annually to the Oil and Watercolour Society's exhibition, mostly of the Perthshire highlands, but comprising also scenes from Durham, the Isle of Wight, and Wales.

When in 1821 the Society of Painters in Oil and Watercolours, now the Royal Watercolour Society of Painters, excluded oil paintings, Robson contributed 26 drawings to the exhibition of that year. Between 1821 and 1833 he exhibited 484 works there.

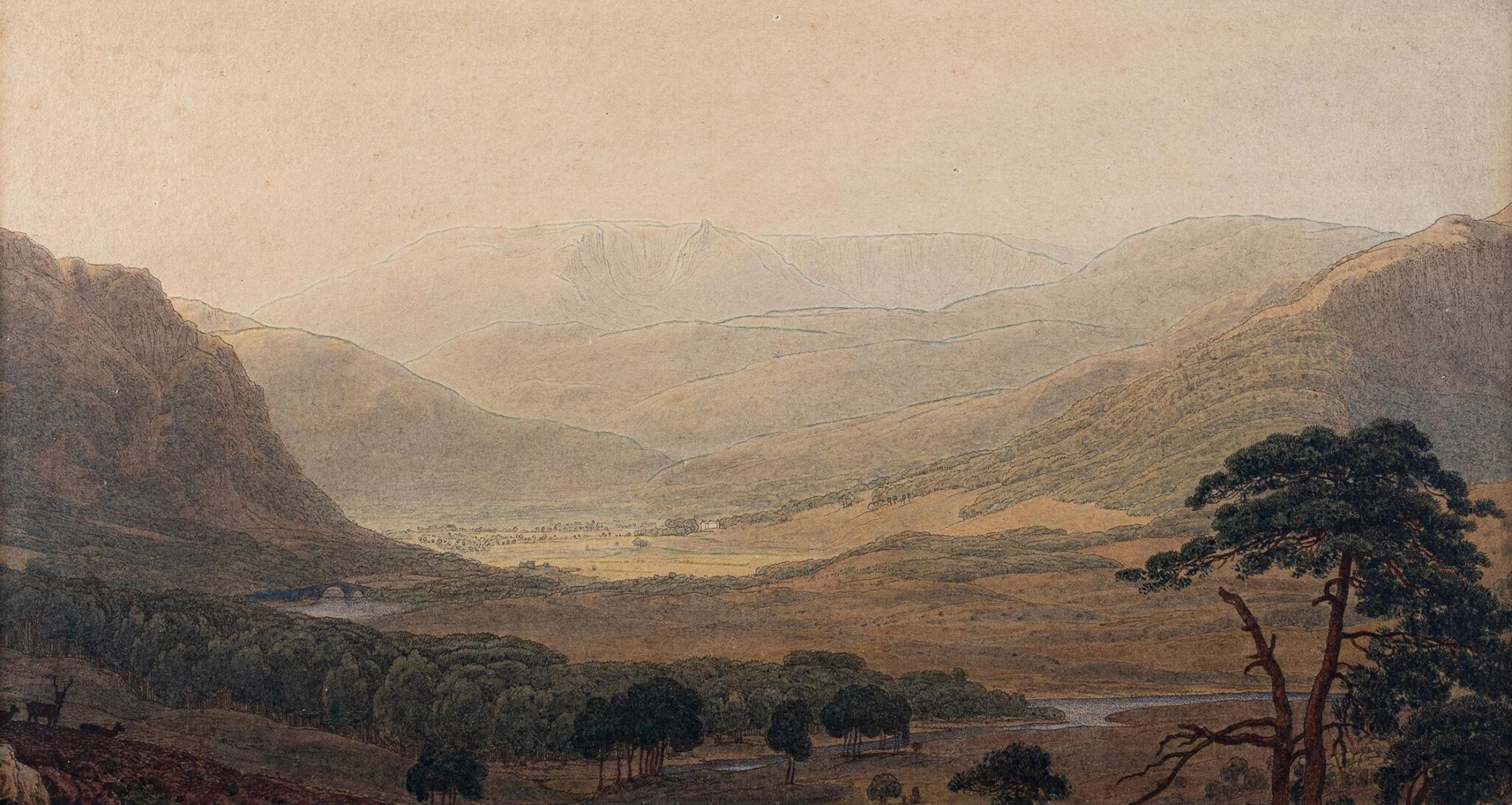
Braemar, Ben y Bourd, from south of Invercauld

Robson's drawings, besides those of the Scottish highlands and of English cities, included views of the English lakes and Lake Killarney, Hastings, the Isle of Wight, and other places, mainly in Berkshire and Somerset. Of the ‘Picturesque Views of the Cities of England,’ published by John Britton in 1828, 32 are by Robson. That year he bought a drawing, by Joshua Cristall, from A Midsummer Night's Dream, cut out the groups, laid them down on separate sheets of paper, and got other artists, including George Barret the younger, to paint backgrounds to them. He exhibited two of these "compositions" as the joint work of Cristall and Barret; and offended Cristall.

From 1829 to 1833 Robson worked with Robert Hills, the animal painter, who did the figures and animals.

There are good collections in the Aberdeen Art Gallery and Victoria and Albert Museum, and the Ashmolean Museum and other UK museums have examples. In the US the Yale Center for British Art and National Gallery of Art have examples.

== Notes ==
Attribution

This article incorporates text from a publication now in the public domain: Lee, Sidney, ed. (1897). "Robson, George Fennel". Dictionary of National Biography. Vol. 49. London: Smith, Elder & Co.

2 artworks by or after George Fennell Robson at the Art UK site
