= Modern Painters =

Five-volume work by John Ruskin (1843 –1860)

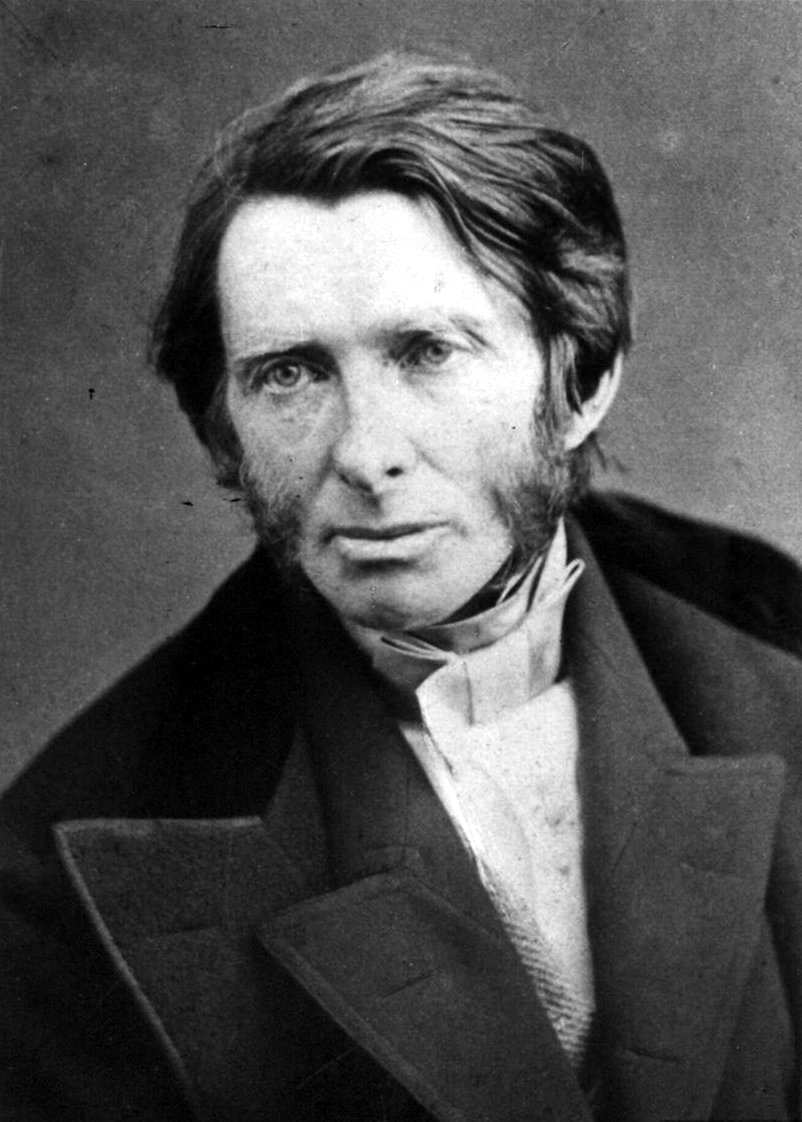
John Ruskin in the 1850s

Modern Painters (1843–1860) is a five-volume work of art criticism by the Victorian art critic John Ruskin, begun when he was 24 years old and based on material collected in Switzerland in 1842. Ruskin argues that recent painters emerging from the tradition of the picturesque are superior in the art of landscape to the old masters. The book was primarily written as a defence of the later work of J. M. W. Turner; the various other contemporary artists discussed get little praise, and many of the old masters are harshly criticised. Ruskin used the book to argue that art should devote itself to the accurate documentation of nature. In Ruskin's view, Turner had developed from early detailed documentation of nature to a later more profound insight into natural forces and atmospheric effects. In this way, Modern Painters reflects "Landscape and Portrait-Painting" (1829) in The Yankee by American art critic John Neal by distinguishing between "things seen by the artist" and "things as they are".

Ruskin added later volumes in subsequent years. Volume two (1846) placed emphasis on symbolism in art, expressed through nature. The second volume was influential on the early development of the Pre-Raphaelite Brotherhood. In the third volume, in 1854, Ruskin coined the term ‘pathetic fallacy’, describing the attribution of human emotion to natural things that are not human. He produced three more volumes, with the fifth and final volume appearing in 1860.

The fifth volume marked the end of the formational and important part of Ruskin's life in which his father had a great influence.

== Volume I ==
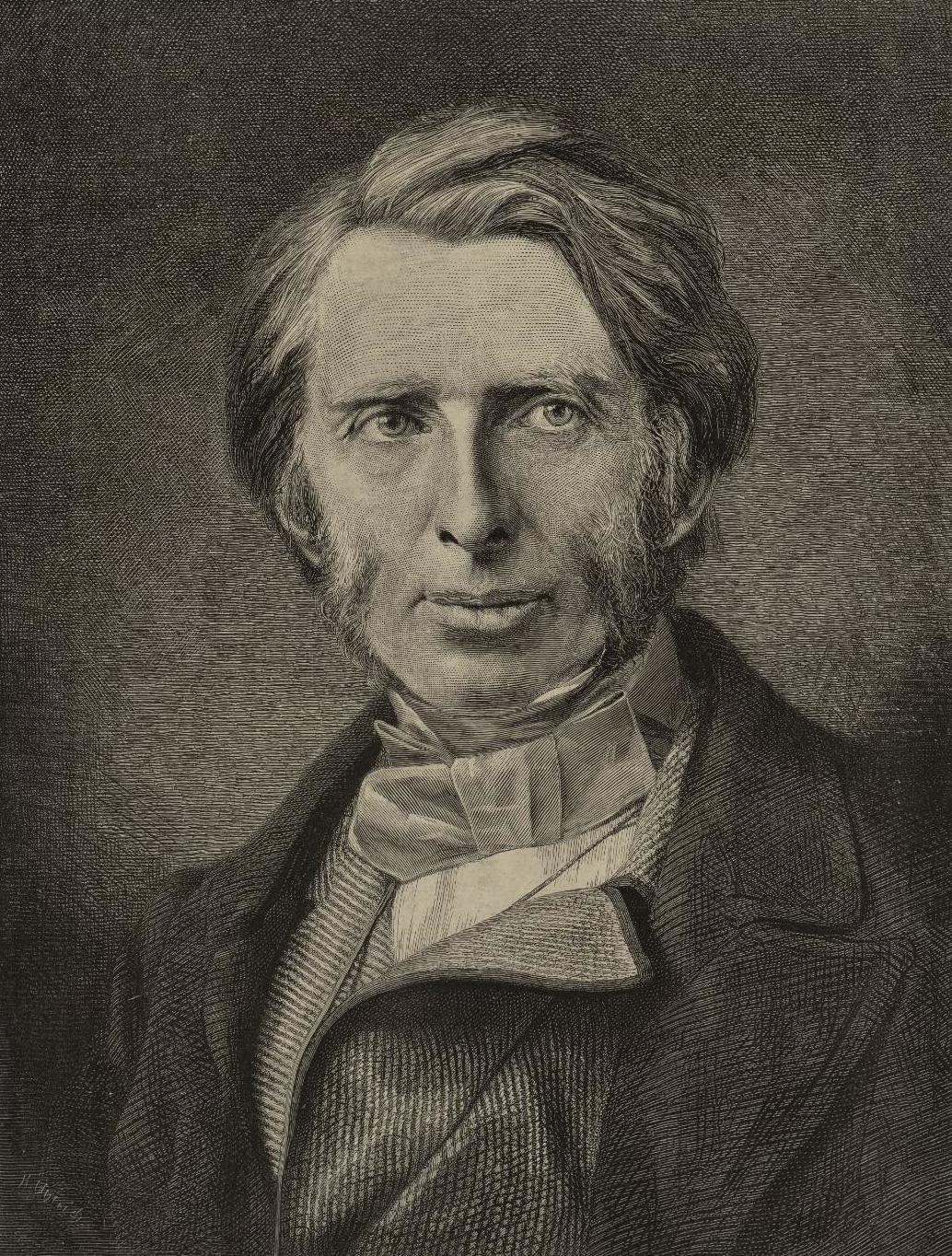
Engraving of Ruskin by Henry Sigismund Uhlrich, c. 1860

For much of the period from late 1840 to autumn 1842, Ruskin was abroad with his parents, mainly in Italy. His studies of Italian art were chiefly guided by George Richmond, to whom the Ruskins were introduced by Joseph Severn, a friend of Keats (whose son, Arthur Severn, later married Ruskin's cousin, Joan). He was galvanised into writing a defence of J. M. W. Turner when he read an attack on several of Turner's pictures exhibited at the Royal Academy. It recalled an attack by the critic Rev John Eagles in Blackwood's Magazine in 1836, which had prompted Ruskin to write a long essay. John James had sent the piece to Turner, who did not wish it to be published. It finally appeared in 1903.

Before Ruskin began Modern Painters, John James Ruskin had begun collecting watercolours, including works by Samuel Prout and Turner. Both painters were among occasional guests of the Ruskins at Herne Hill, and 163 Denmark Hill (demolished 1947) to which the family moved in 1842. Volume 1 is "respectfully" dedicated to "The landscape painters of England, by their sincere admirer, the Author", although apart from Turner, the praise given to other "moderns" is mixed with sometimes brutal criticism.

What became the first volume of Modern Painters (1843), published by Smith, Elder & Co. under the anonymous authority of "A Graduate of Oxford", was Ruskin's answer to Turner's critics. Ruskin controversially argued that modern landscape painters—and in particular Turner—were superior to the so-called "Old Masters" of the post-Renaissance period. Ruskin maintained that, unlike Turner, Old Masters such as Gaspard Dughet (Gaspar Poussin), Claude, and Salvator Rosa favoured pictorial convention, and not "truth to nature". He explained that he meant "moral as well as material truth". The job of the artist is to observe the reality of nature and not to invent it in a studio—to render imaginatively on canvas what he has seen and understood, free of any rules of composition. For Ruskin, modern landscapists demonstrated superior understanding of the "truths" of water, air, clouds, stones, and vegetation, a profound appreciation of which Ruskin demonstrated in his own prose. He described works he had seen at the National Gallery and Dulwich Picture Gallery with extraordinary verbal felicity.

Although critics were slow to react and the reviews were mixed, many notable literary and artistic figures were impressed with the young man's work, including Charlotte Brontë and Elizabeth Gaskell. Suddenly Ruskin had found his métier, and in one leap helped redefine the genre of art criticism, mixing a discourse of polemic with aesthetics, scientific observation and ethics.

After lengthy prefaces, added to for later editions, Part 1 of the volume sets out Ruskin's general principles. Part 2 applies these to specific artists, both modern and old masters. Modern painters discussed include Turner, Richard Wilson, Thomas Gainsborough, John Constable, Augustus Wall Callcott, David Cox, George Fennell Robson, Peter de Wint, Copley Fielding, James Duffield Harding, Samuel Prout, George Cattermole, David Roberts, and Clarkson Frederick Stanfield.

== Volume II ==
Drawing on his travels in France and Italy, he wrote the second volume of Modern Painters (published April 1846). The volume concentrated on Renaissance and pre-Renaissance artists rather than on Turner. It was a more theoretical work than its predecessor. Ruskin explicitly linked the aesthetic and the divine, arguing that truth, beauty and religion are inextricably bound together: "the Beautiful as a gift of God". In defining categories of beauty and imagination, Ruskin argued that all great artists must perceive beauty and, with their imagination, communicate it creatively by means of symbolic representation. Generally, critics gave this second volume a warmer reception, although many found the attack on the aesthetic orthodoxy associated with Joshua Reynolds difficult to accept.

== Volumes III and IV ==
Both volumes III and IV of Modern Painters were published in 1856. In MP III Ruskin argued that all great art is "the expression of the spirits of great men". Only the morally and spiritually healthy are capable of admiring the noble and the beautiful, and transforming them into great art by imaginatively penetrating their essence. MP IV presents the geology of the Alps in terms of landscape painting, and their moral and spiritual influence on those living nearby. The contrasting final chapters, "The Mountain Glory" and "The Mountain Gloom" provide an early example of Ruskin's social analysis, highlighting the poverty of the peasants living in the lower Alps.

== Volume V ==
Ruskin's explorations of nature and aesthetics in the fifth and final volume of Modern Painters focused on Giorgione, Paolo Veronese, Titian and Turner. Ruskin asserted that the components of the greatest artworks are held together, like human communities, in a quasi-organic unity. Competitive struggle is destructive. Uniting Modern Painters V and Unto This Last is Ruskin's "Law of Help":[110]

Government and cooperation are in all things and eternally the laws of life. Anarchy and competition, eternally, and in all things, the laws of death.

— John Ruskin, Modern Painters V and Unto This Last: Cook and Wedderburn 7.207 and 17.25.
