= Society of East Anglian Watercolourists =

Society of East Anglian Watercolourists (SEAW) is a watercolour society in East Anglia, England, founded in 2007.

== History ==
The Society of East Anglian Watercolourists (SEAW) was inaugurated in 2007 with the help and guidance of the Royal Watercolour Society and their then president Richard Sorrell. The society was founded to promote watercolour as a painting medium throughout East Anglia. It is the only regional society in England dedicated to the medium of watercolour.

== Description ==
The SEAW provides a platform for watercolour artists living and working in East Anglia to become part of a community where their work can be exhibited and where they can participate in courses and social activities. Members are drawn from Suffolk, Norfolk, Cambridgeshire, Essex and Bedfordshire.

In the past, the society ran a series of one-day classes and painting days. Tutors included Thomas Plunkett PRWS, Geoffrey Pimlott RWS, Colin Merrin RWS, Julia Sorrell RI RBA, Roger Jones, David Hyde, and others drawn from the Royal Watercolour Society, the Royal Institute of Painters in Watercolours, and the New English Art Club, and also from the society's own professional members.

In late 2018, the Society introduced a Friends of the SEAW programme, where non-members in the region can sign up to participate in painting days and get preferential submission rates for exhibitions. At the same time, the Associate Member level was introduced as a step before full membership.

The Society currently has two Honorary Members: Richard Sorrell PPRWS and Jula Sorrell RI RBA. It also has a Patron: Lillias August RI.

== Exhibitions ==
The society holds three exhibitions a year: one Member's Exhibition where members have at least one work shown; one Selected Exhibition where an independent committee will have at least one member of the Royal Watercolour Society on the panel along with two professional people from the world of the visual arts; and one Open exhibition where members' work is unselected and non-member's work is selected by the SEAW committee. The Society endeavours to host these exhibitions in different counties with in East Anglia.

== See also ==
- Royal Watercolour Society
- Royal Institute of Painters in Watercolours
