= William Frederick Wells =

English painter

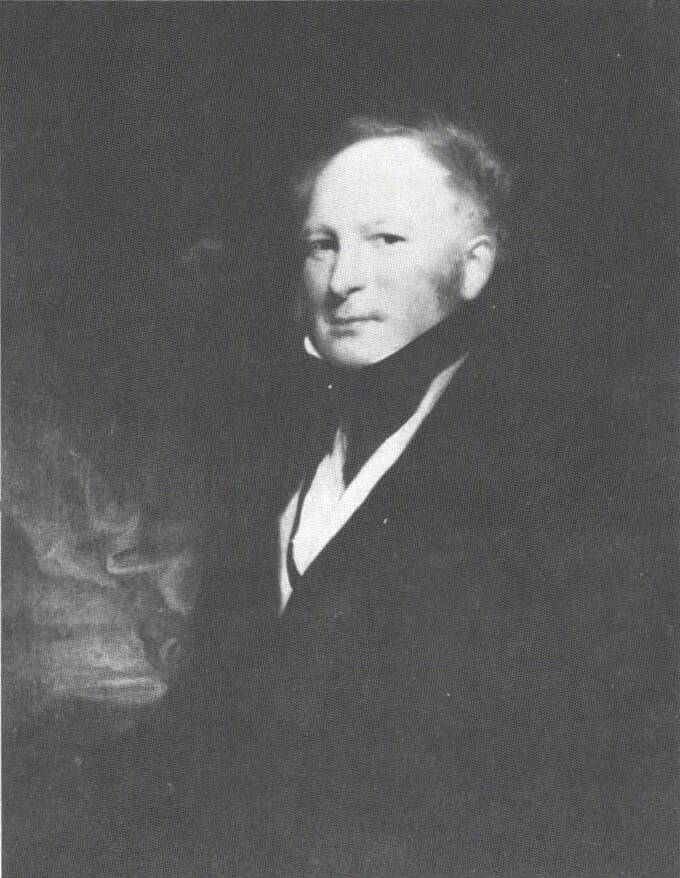
- Born: c. 1762; London
- Died: 16 November 1836; Mitcham Common
- Occupation: Painter
- Partner: Susannah Arabella Thrale

William Frederick Wells (1762 – 10 November 1836) was a British watercolour landscape painter and etcher.

Wells was born in London in 1762. Wells studied art in London under John James Barralet (1747–1815). On 30 November 1804, Wells initiated the founding of the Society of Painters in Watercolours (now the Royal Watercolour Society), at a meeting held at the Stratford Coffee House, Oxford St, London. He served as President of the fledgling association from 1806 to 1807.

He travelled and painted extensively in England and Europe, particularly in Norway and Sweden. Wells' art was annually exhibited at the Royal Academy from 1795 to 1813. He held the post of Professor of Drawing at Addiscombe Military Seminary for officers of the East India Company Army over twenty years from 1813 until his retirement, immediately before his death, in November 1836. Wells was an intimate friend of Joseph Mallord William Turner.

Between 1801 and 1805 Wells and his collaborator John Laporte made seventy-two soft-ground etchings after drawings by Thomas Gainsborough (thirty-three by Laporte, the remainder by Wells). They initially issued these etchings as individual plates, upon completion of each (thus bearing publication dates ranging from 1802 to 1805), and then as hand-coloured and bound sets under the title A Collection of Prints, illustrative of English Scenery, from the Drawings and Sketches of Gainsborough (circa 1805; reissued in 1819 by the publisher H.R. Young but with only around sixty-two plates and the original publication dates removed from these).

Amongst Wells's other works as an etcher is his soft-ground set, Select Views in Cumberland (1810).

In 1819, Wells moved to a house on Mitcham Common, Surrey. He died there on 10 November 1836, and was buried in Mitcham churchyard.

== Personal life ==
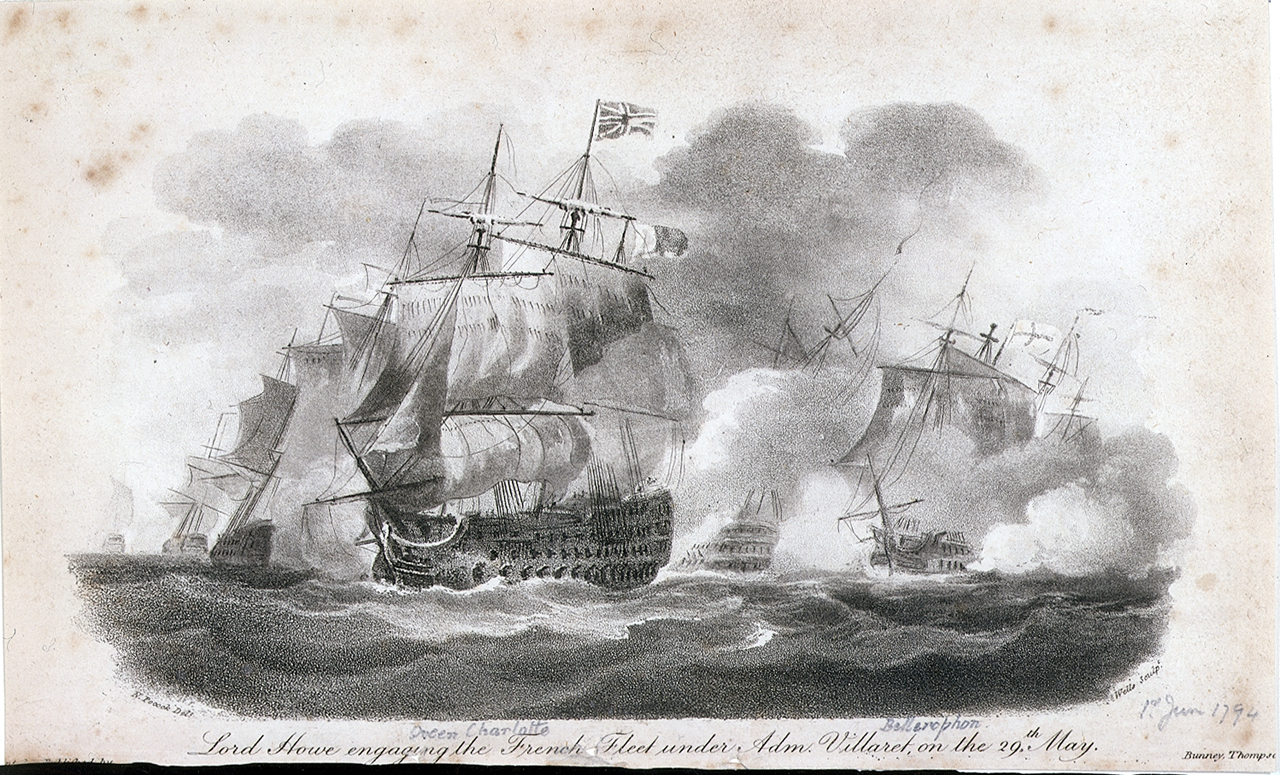
Admiral Lord Howe engaging the French fleet on 29 May 1794: an engraving by Wells after Nicholas Pocock

Wells married his wife, Mary, in about 1786. The couple had nine children (three sons and six daughters), of whom two died in infancy. Mary died in 1807. In his will, Wells left the eldest of his sons only 5s., in the hope "that he would see the error of his ways".
