= Joshua Cristall =

English painter

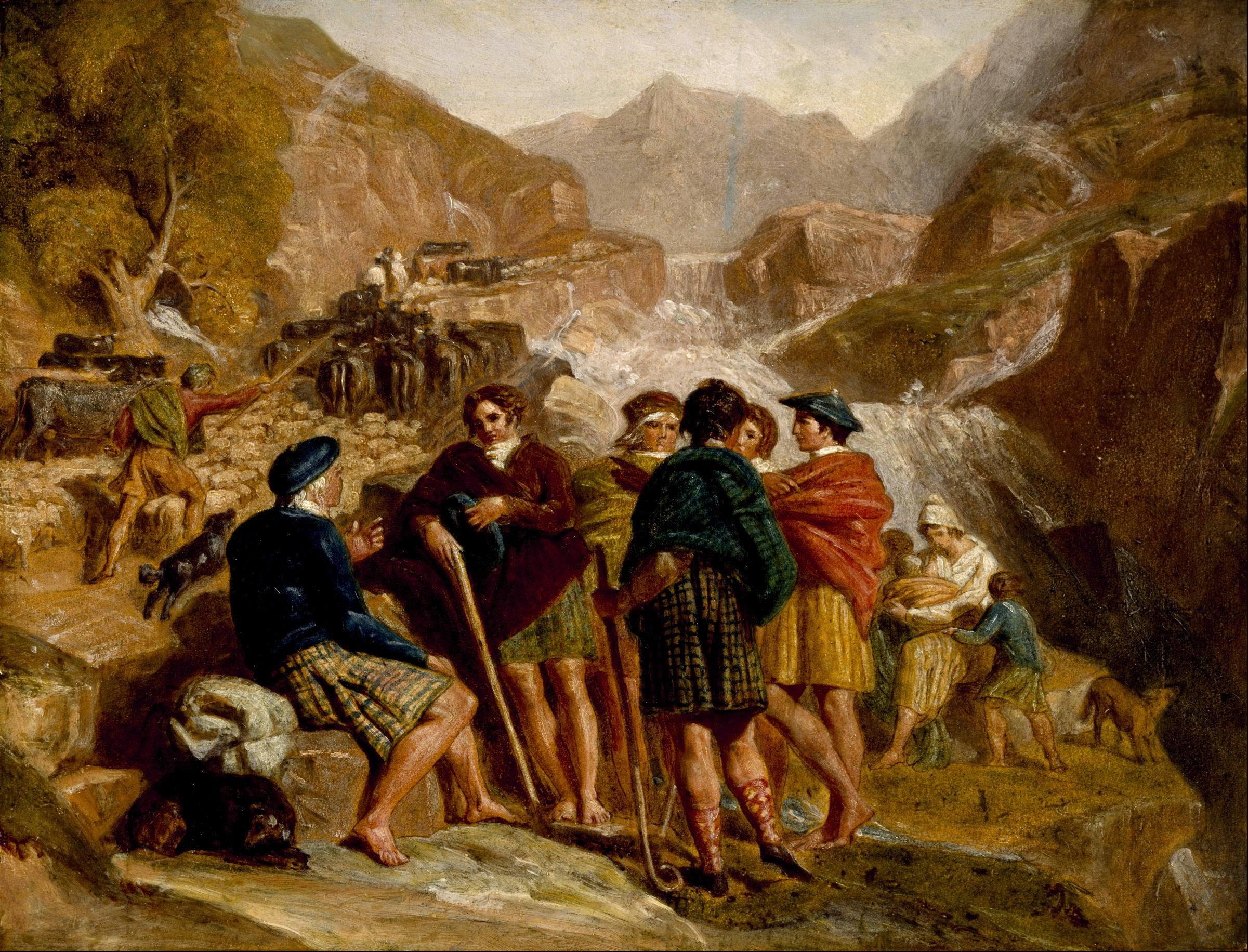
Highlanders Consulting

Joshua Cristall (1767–1847) was an English painter. For a time he was president of the Society of Painters in Water-Colours, a medium in which he showed a pleasing freedom and simplicity of style.

Cristall's usual subjects in his early years were classical figures with landscapes, such as his Lycidas, Judgment of Paris, Hylas and the Nymphs, and Diana and Endymion, but he moved later to genre subjects and rustic groups. Around 1813 he tried portrait painting, generally small full-lengths with landscape backgrounds using no bodycolour. As a watercolour painter, Cristall gained an honourable position from the freedom and simplicity of his style and manner of execution.

== Life ==
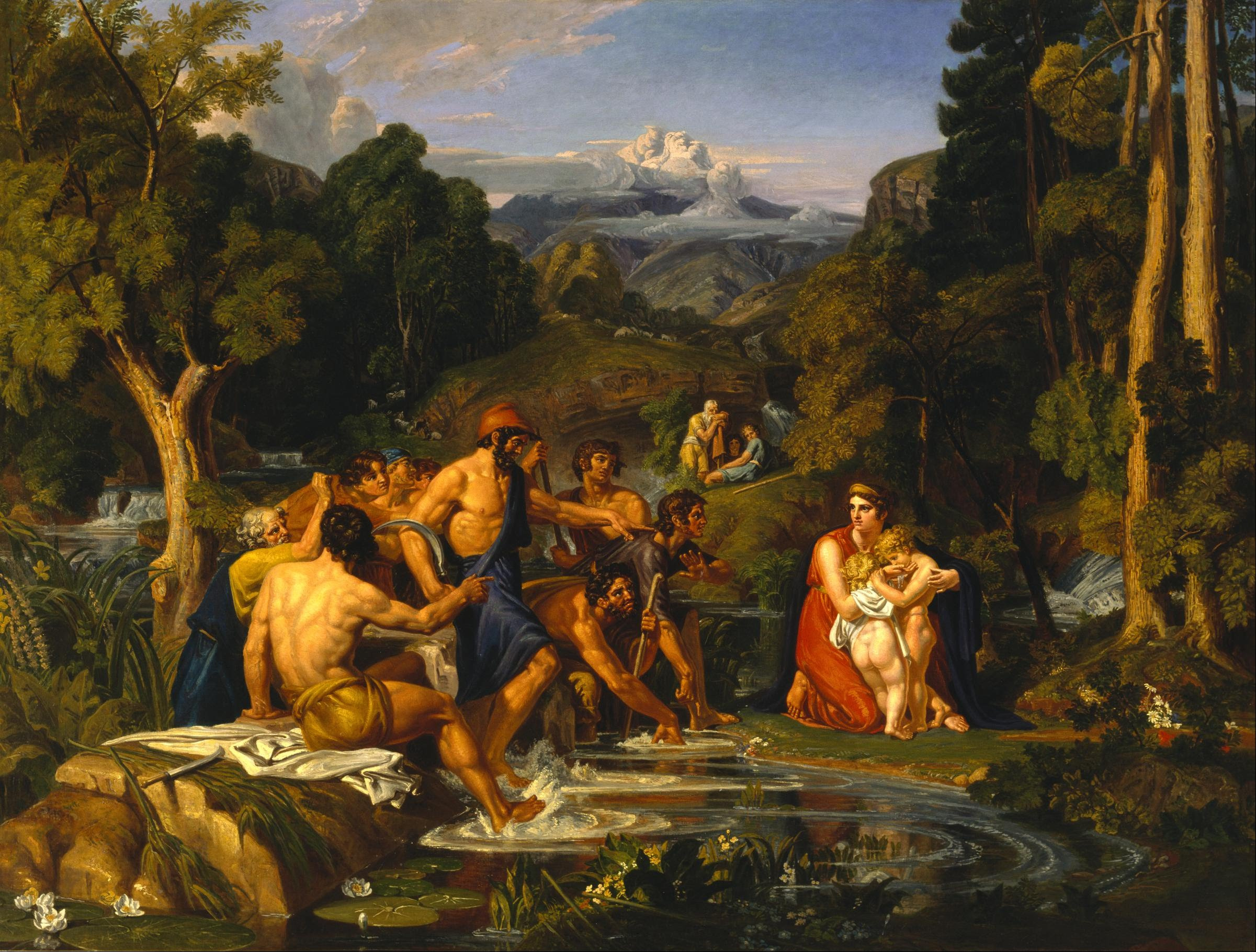
Latona and the Lycian peasants.

Cristall was born at Camborne in Cornwall. His mother shared with and inspired in her son a taste for classic art. His father was Scottish and bitterly opposed to his son's artistic tastes, but his mother secretly aided him in his struggles to study art. He was joined at school in London by his sister Ann Batten Cristall, who was to become a poet and a schoolteacher. He was first apprenticed to a china dealer at Rotherhithe, but after finding that business too irksome, he left for the Staffordshire Potteries, where he found employment as a china painter. Finding that job too monotonous, he went to London, and commenced a life of great privations and hard efforts to study the fine arts. During this period of his life, he reportedly seriously injured his health by trying to live for a year on just potatoes and water. Aided in secret by his mother, he persevered in his endeavours, and finally gained admission to the school of the Royal Academy, where he made rapid progress. He became personally known to Dr. Monro and visited his house, where he met the rising water-colour artists of the day.

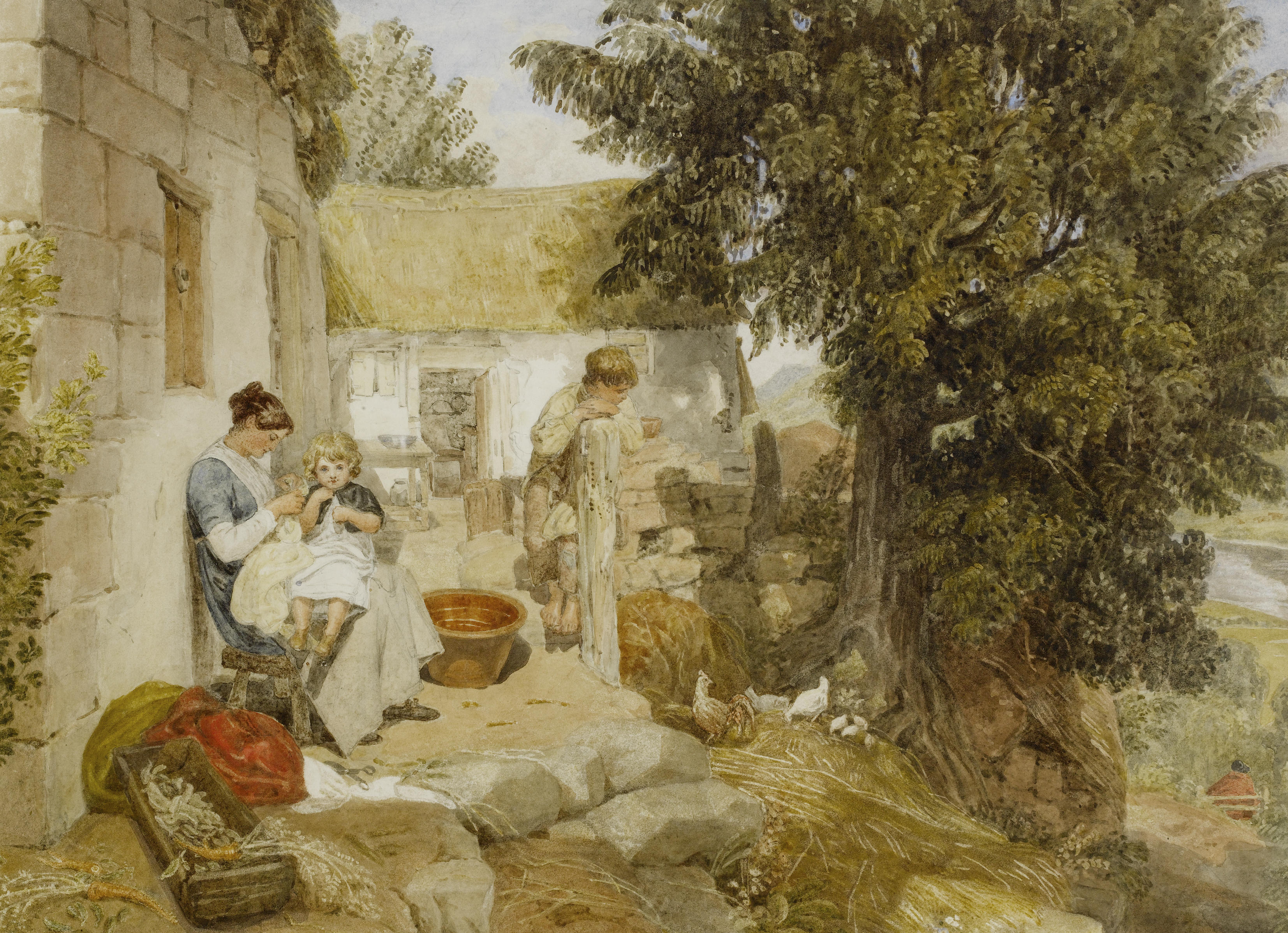
A Cottage on the Side of Symond's Rock, watercolour, 1825

In 1805, he became a founder of the Society of Painters in Water-Colours and made the first public exhibition of his works there, continuing to exhibit there for many years, and later becoming its President. In 1822, with his health in decline, Cristall went to Goodrich on the Wye, where he had bought a house and spent happy years, until the loss of his wife in 1840 drove him again to London, where he died in 1847. His body was buried next to his wife in Goodrich, as he had requested.

== Works ==
Five of his drawings (including The Young Fisher-Boy and The Fish Market on Hastings Beach) are in the Victoria and Albert Museum. Cristall was an early member of the Sketching Society. He also furnished some of the classical figures in Barret's landscapes and some groups in George Fennell Robson's Scotch Scenery.
