= Sawrey Gilpin =

English painter (1733–1807)

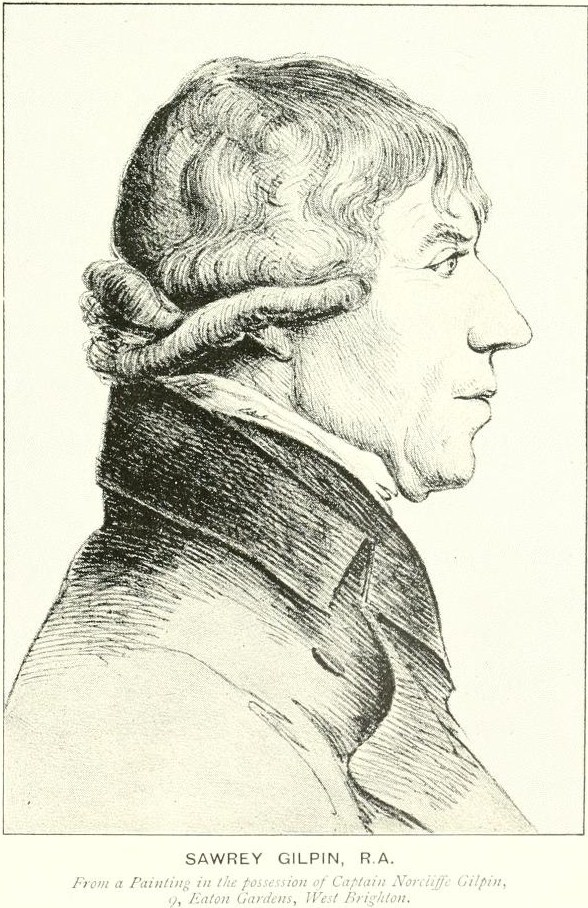
Portrait of Gilpin (engraving by William Daniell after George Dance)

Sawrey Gilpin RA (30 October 1733 - 8 March 1807) was an English animal painter, illustrator, and etcher who specialised in paintings of horses and dogs. He was made a Royal Academician.

== Life and work ==
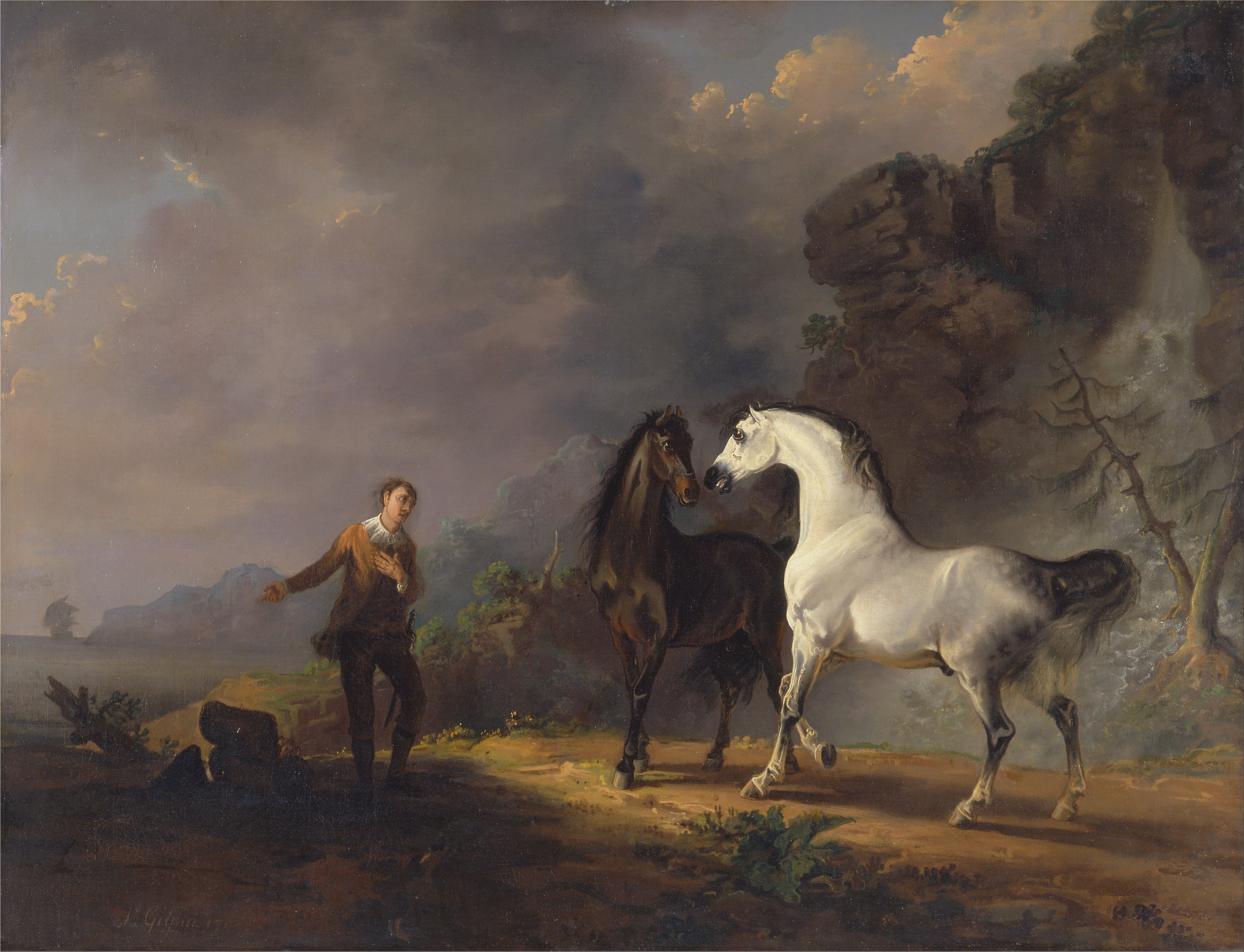
Gulliver Addressing the Houyhnhnms

Gilpin was born in Carlisle in Cumbria, Kingdom of Great Britain. He was the seventh child of Captain John Bernard Gilpin, a soldier and amateur artist, and Matilda Langstaffe. He was the younger brother of the Rev. William Gilpin, a clergyman and schoolmaster who wrote of several influential works on picturesque scenery.

As a child Gilpin learnt to draw from his father, who ran a drawing school in Carlisle. Having shown an early predilection for art, he was sent to London at the age of fourteen to study under the marine painter Samuel Scott in Covent Garden. Gilpin, however, preferred sketching the passing market carts and horses, and it soon became evident that animals, especially horses, were his speciality. Gilpin left Scott in 1758, and devoted himself to animal painting from then on. Some of his sketches were shown to the Duke of Cumberland, who was much impressed by them, and employed Gilpin to draw from his stud at Newmarket and at Windsor, where he was ranger of the Great Park. He afforded the artist considerable material assistance in his profession.

== Animal painter ==
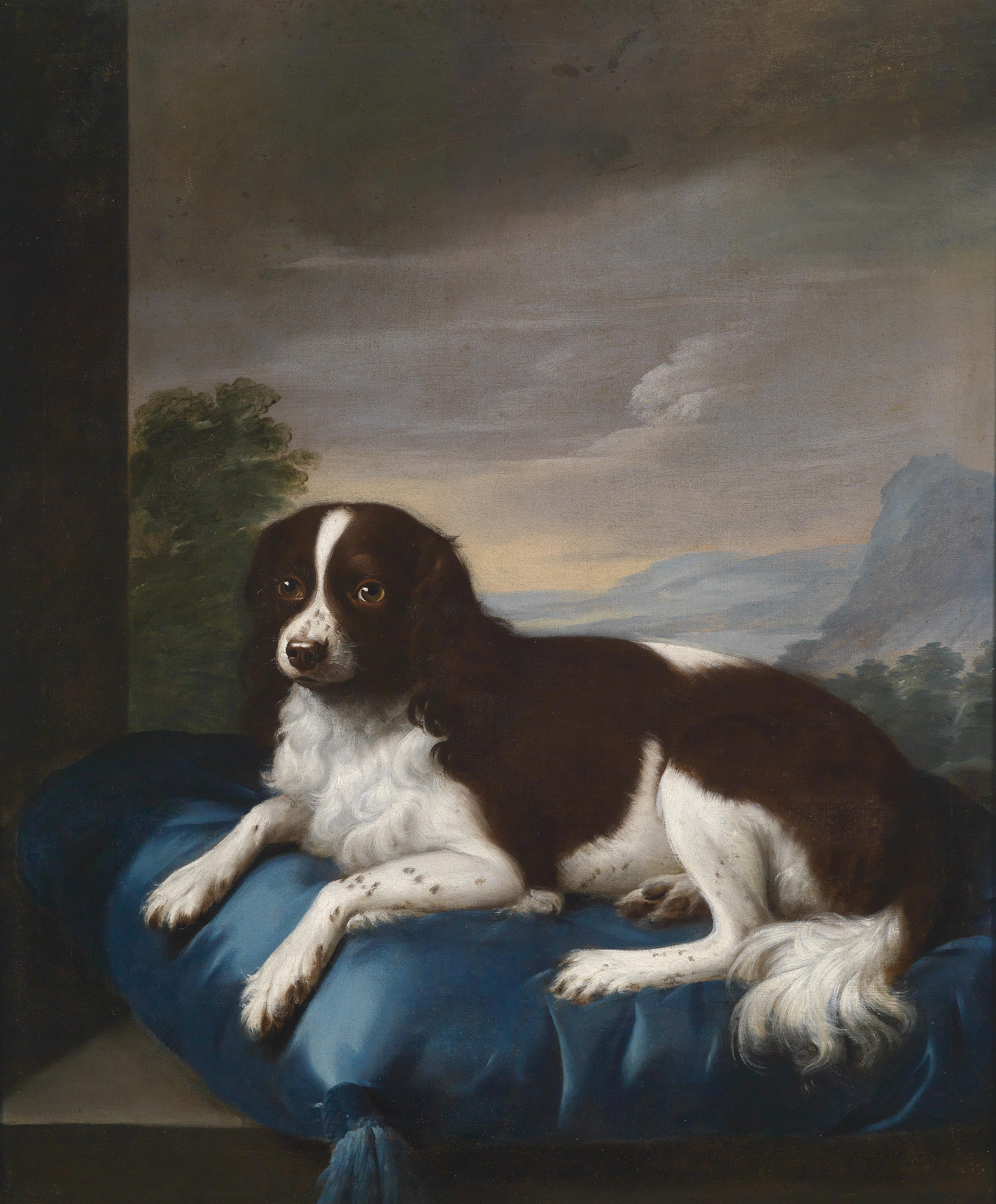
English Springer Spaniel on a cushion, 1807

Gilpin lived at Knightsbridge in London for some years. He became one of the best painters of horses that the country had produced, and was almost as successful in other areas of animal art. He sometimes attempted historical pictures on a larger scale in which horses were prominent, but with rather less success. He was purely an animal painter, and required the assistance of others to paint landscapes and figures; for the former he often turned to George Barret, Sr., to whom he gave similar service in return, and for the latter he sometimes used the services of John Zoffany, and Philip Reinagle.

Gilpin first exhibited with the Incorporated Society of Artists in 1762, and continued to show pictures there, mostly of horses, up to 1783. In 1768, and 1770-1, he exhibited a series of pictures illustrating "Gulliver's visit to the Houyhnhnms", one of which was engraved in mezzotint by Valentine Green; in 1770 a drawing of "Darius gaining the Persian Empire by the neighing of his horse"; in 1771 "The Duke of Cumberland visiting his stud (with a view of Windsor Castle from the Great Park, by William Marlow)". In 1773 he became a director of the society, and in 1774 president.

He exhibited at the Royal Academy, London from 1786 until his death. He was elected an associate of the academy (ARA) in 1795, and Royal Academician (RA) in 1797.

Gilpin married Elizabeth Broom; their son William Sawrey Gilpin (1762–1843) also became an artist, and in later life a landscape gardener. After his wife's death Gilpin lived in Bedfordshire with his friend Samuel Whitbread. He then returned to London and spent his last years with his daughters at Brompton, where he died on 8 March 1807.

His pupils included John Warwick Smith and George Garrard. The latter married his eldest daughter Matilda.

== Works ==
Many of his pictures of horses, dogs, and sporting scenes were engraved, notably The Death of the Fox (Royal Academy, 1788), engraved by John Scott (1774–1827); and Heron-Hawking (Society of Artists, 1780), engraved by Thomas Morris (fl. 1780-1800). He also made some etchings of horses and cattle, and made many illustrations for the works, both published and unpublished, of his brother William. His portrait is included in the series of drawings by George Dance (1741–1821), engraved by William Daniell, and now in the National Portrait Gallery.

There are works by Gilpin in the collections of the Courtauld Institute of Art, Tate Britain, and the Royal Academy, in London and the Fitzwilliam Museum, Cambridge.

== Gallery ==
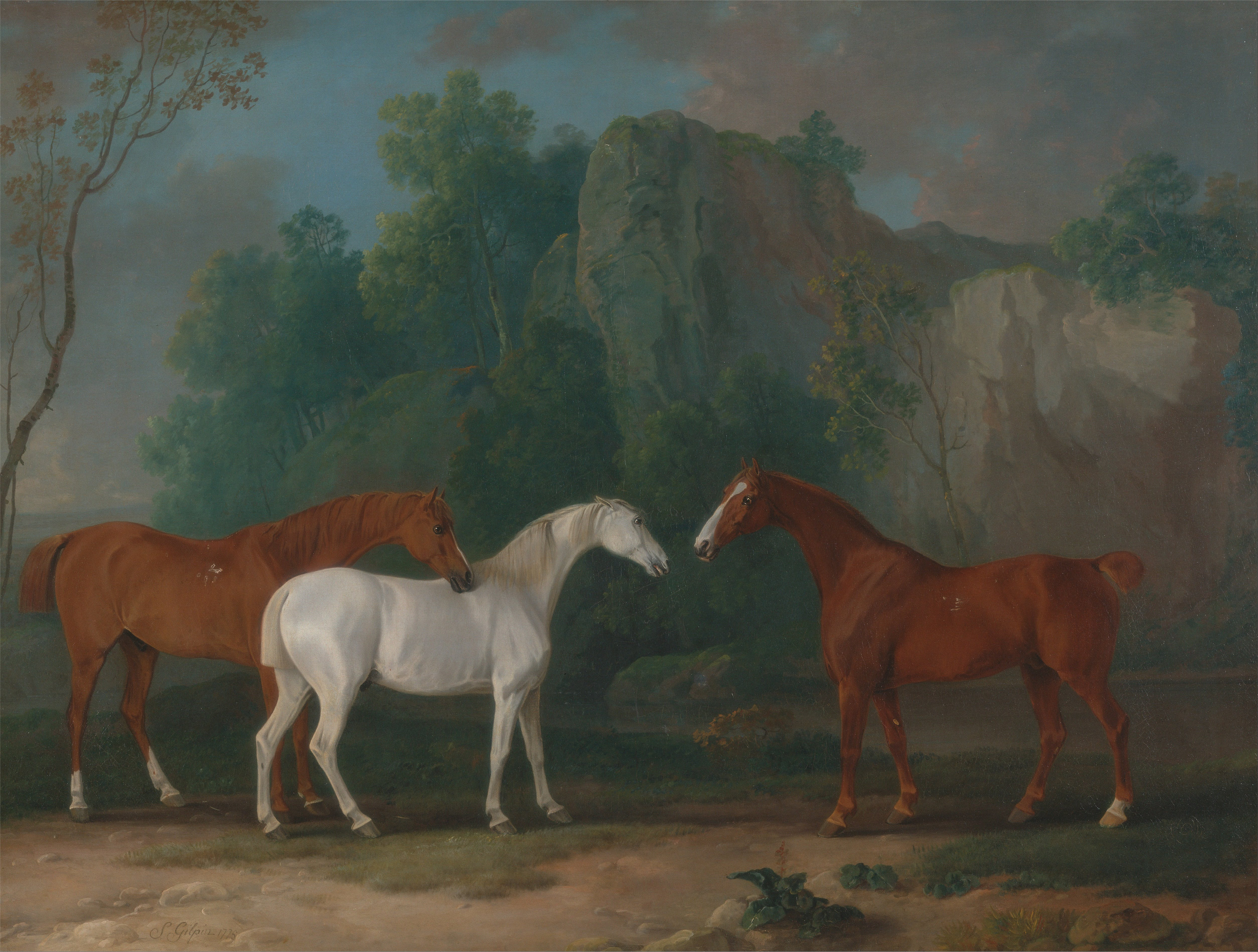
Three Hunters in a Rocky Landscape

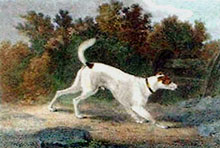
A painting of Pitch owned by Colonel Thomas Thornton, 1790

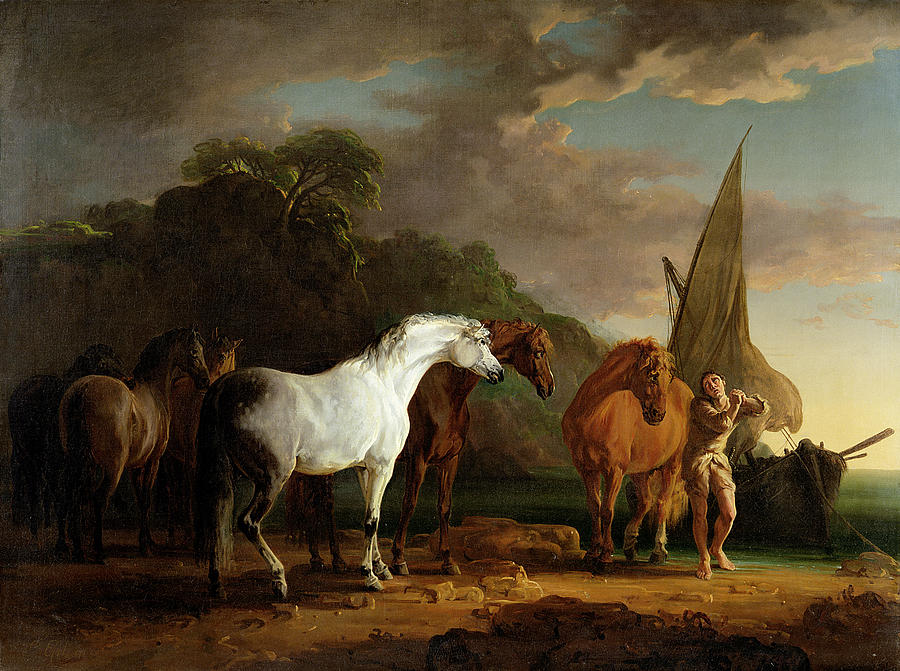
Gulliver Taking His Final Leave of the Land of the Houyhnhnms

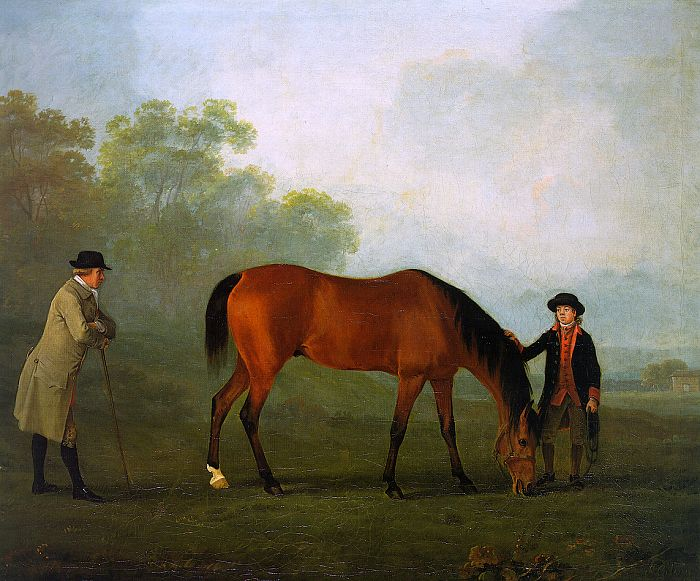
Furiband with his Owner, Sir Harry Harpur, and a Groom (1774)
