= John Melchior Barralet =

Irish artist (1747–1815)

- Born: 1753; Dublin, Ireland
- Died: 1822 (aged 68–69)

John Melchior Barralet (1753 – 1822) was an Irish artist and teacher, known for his topographic works.

== Life ==
Barralet's business card held in the British Museum

John Melchior Barralet was born in 1753 to a French Huguenot family in Dublin. His older brother was also an artist, John James He had at least one other brother, Joseph.

He probably began his career in Dublin, but there are no records of his work, but he may have attended the Dublin Society schools like his older brother. By 1774, he was working in London, living at 30 Frith Street from where he exhibited two landscapes with the Free Society. In 1775, he exhibited a tinted drawing at the Royal Academy, going onto to exhibit there until 1778 at which time he was living at 3 Orange Street. In 1783, he exhibited 9 drawing with the Society of Artists from an address in Clapham. His last exhibited work with the Royal Academy was in 1787, when he was living in South Lambeth. Much of his work are tinted drawings of the landscapes of Surrey, Kent, and London, some of which were engraved.

Barralet was primarily employed as a teacher, like his older brother. Among his students was John Laporte.

In 1913, Walter G. Strickland records that the British Museum held his business card and 3 of his aquatints in their collections, and the Victoria and Albert Museum held a drawing of "All Saints Church and Bishop's Palace, Maidstone" dated 1776.
