= John Scott (engraver) =

English engraver (1774–1827)

John Scott (1774–1827) was an English engraver, known for his work on topics showing animals.

== Life ==
He was born on 12 March 1774 at Newcastle-on-Tyne, where his father, John Scott, worked in a brewery. At the age of twelve he was apprenticed to a tallow-chandler; but at the end of his articles went to London, where his fellow-townsman Robert Pollard gave him two years' instruction, at the same time paying him.

On leaving Pollard, Scott obtained employment from John Wheble, the proprietor of the Sporting Magazine, and for many years executed the portraits of racehorses published there. He became known among English animal engravers.

Scott worked until 1821, when a stroke of paralysis practically terminated his career; during the last years of his life he was assisted by the Artists' Benevolent Fund, of which he had been one of the originators. Scott died at his residence in Chelsea, London, on 24 December 1827. He left a widow, and several daughters; one son, John R. Scott, also became an engraver, and executed some plates for the Sporting Magazine.

A portrait of Scott, drawn by John Jackson R.A. in 1823, was engraved by William Thomas Fry and published in 1826. A crayon portrait by his son went to the print-room of the British Museum.

== Works ==
Scott's works included:

- William Barker Daniel's British Rural Sports, 1801, many of the plates in which were both designed and engraved by him;
- Sportsman's Cabinet, a correct delineation of the Canine Race, 1804;
- History and Delineation of the Horse, 1809; and
- Sportsman's Repository, comprising a series of engravings representing the horse and the dog in all their varieties, from paintings by Marshall, Reinagle, Gilpin, Stubbs, and Cooper, 1820, which made Scott famous.

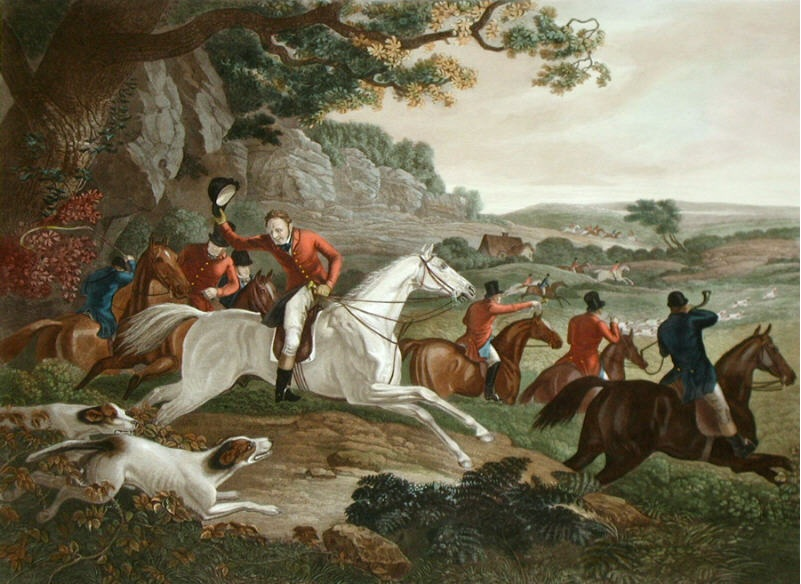
Col. Thornton, Breaking Cover by Philip Reinagle, engraving by John Scott.

A pair of large plates, Breaking Cover, after Philip Reinagle, and Death of the Fox, after Sawrey Gilpin, issued in 1811, are regarded as his masterpieces. Scott also did much work for publications of a different kind, such as Henry Tresham and William Young Ottley's British Gallery, Ottley's Stafford Gallery, John Britton's Fine Arts of the English School, James Hakewill's Tour of Italy, and Peter Coxe's Social Day.
