= Ann Batten Cristall =

English poet and schoolteacher (1769–1848)

Ann Batten Cristall (1769–1848) was an English poet and schoolteacher on friendly terms with Mary Wollstonecraft, Anna Letitia Barbauld and several other writers of her period. A recent critic has noted in her work "technical virtuosity, masked by claims of metrical irregularity, and a profound questioning of Romantic values."

== Early life and education ==
Ann Batten Cristall's date of birth is not known, but she was baptised in Penzance, Cornwall, on 7 December 1769 as the second of the four children of Alexander Cristall (1718 or 1719–1802), a mariner and later a sailmaker, originally from Monifieth, near Dundee, Scotland, by his second wife Elizabeth (1745–1801), the daughter of the Penzance merchant John Batten. She also had two half-brothers through her father's first marriage. The family moved to London during her childhood, and then to Rotherhithe and Blackheath. Her father is said to have had "a dread of the arts", but her mother was a "woman of education and taste".

Partly educated by her mother, Ann was then sent to school in London with her brother Joshua Cristall (baptised 1768–1847), who became a noted water-colourist.

== Career ==
Cristall became a schoolteacher but seems to have remained dependent financially on her brother Joshua. There are several references to her in the correspondence of Mary Wollstonecraft, who wrote to Joshua in March 1790 that Ann's "comfort very much depends on you." In a further letter to Joshua on 9 December 1790 she noted, "I fear her situation is very uncomfortable. I wish she could obtain a little more strength of mind."

Wollstonecraft, along with Barbauld, John Aikin, Mary Hays, Ann Jebb and other literary figures, features in the subscription list for Christall's Poetical Sketches, which was published in 1795 by Joseph Johnson. It includes a self-deprecating preface by the poet.

Cristall's longer narrative poems and her verse pastoral sketches tend to be melancholy and inclined towards the uncanny or even horrific. Critics at the time noted some imperfections, but praised her "genius and Warmth of imagination". They include some nature description and laments for dying genius. A recent critic discerned in her work "technical virtuosity, masked by claims of metrical irregularity, and a profound questioning of Romantic values." Another modern commentator has called her book of poems "a remarkable text of women's Romanticism".

A suggestion by the poet George Dyer for Cristall to collaborate with Mary Hays on a "poetical novel" was not followed through. She was introduced in 1797 to Robert Southey, who praised her genius in a letter of 13 March 1797 to the publisher Joseph Cottle.

== Later life and death ==
Little is known of Cristall's later life. She appears to have dropped out of the literary social scene after the 1790s and to have remained unmarried. She may have lived latterly with a younger sister, Elizabeth, an engraver, serving as an assistant at Lewisham Hill Grammar School in Kent. She died on 9 February 1848, four months after her brother. There is a memorial inscription in her maiden name in St Mary's Church, Lewisham, where she was buried.
