= William Thomas Fry =

British engraver (1789–1843)

William Thomas Fry (1789–1843) was a British engraver. He occasionally exhibited his engravings at the Suffolk Street exhibition.

== Works ==
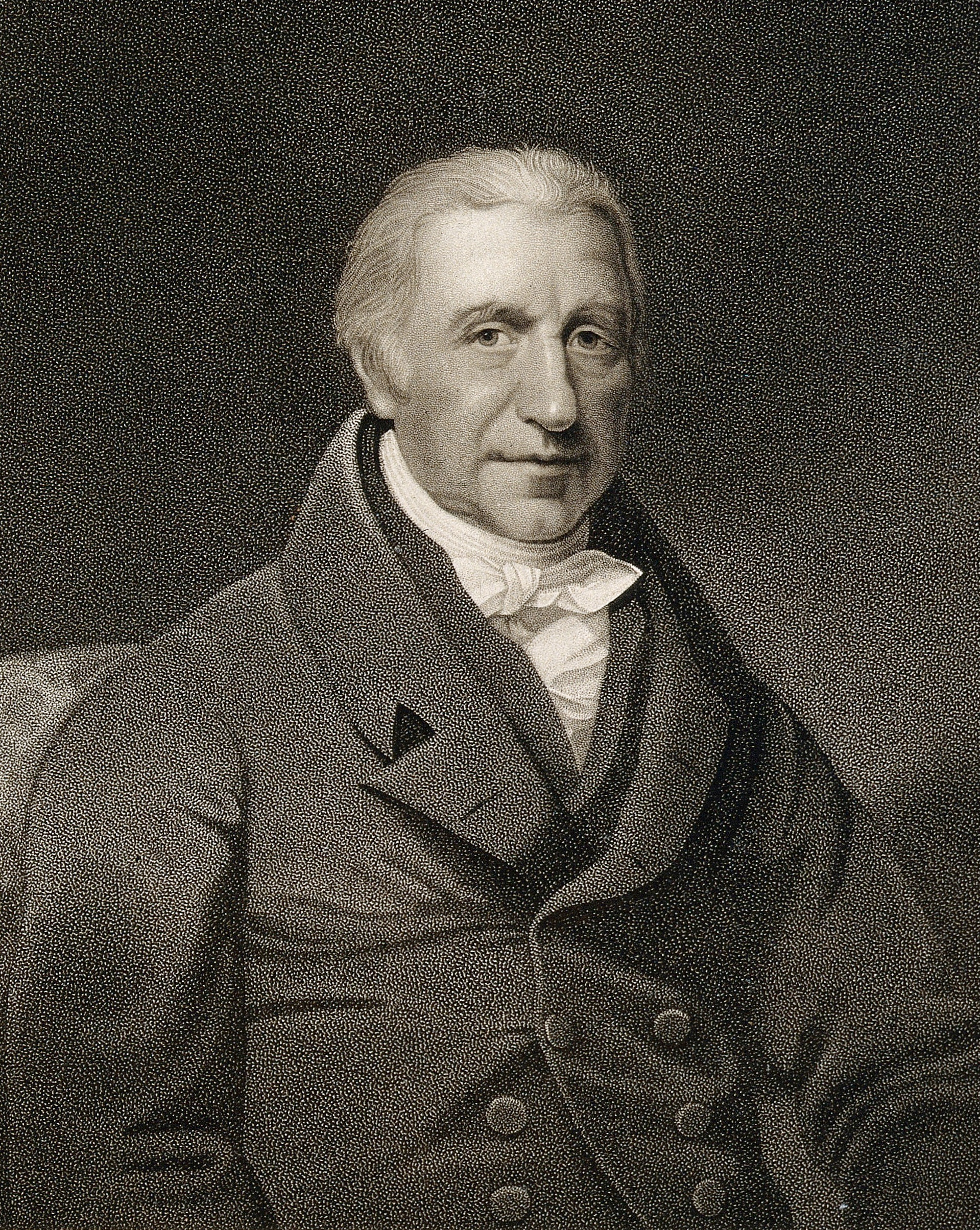
William Babington, by William Thomas Fry

Fry worked chiefly in stipple. He engraved four portraits for Fisher, Son, & Co.'s National Portrait Gallery:

- Princess Charlotte, and the Earl of Liverpool, after Sir T. Lawrence;
- Admiral Earl Howe, after Gainsborough Dupont; and
- the Rev. Samuel Lee, after Richard Evans.

He also engraved portraits, after J. Jackson, R.A., including Robert Hills, the animal painter, John Scott the engraver, and others. For Jones's National Gallery he executed eleven engravings.
