= George Henry Laporte =

English painter

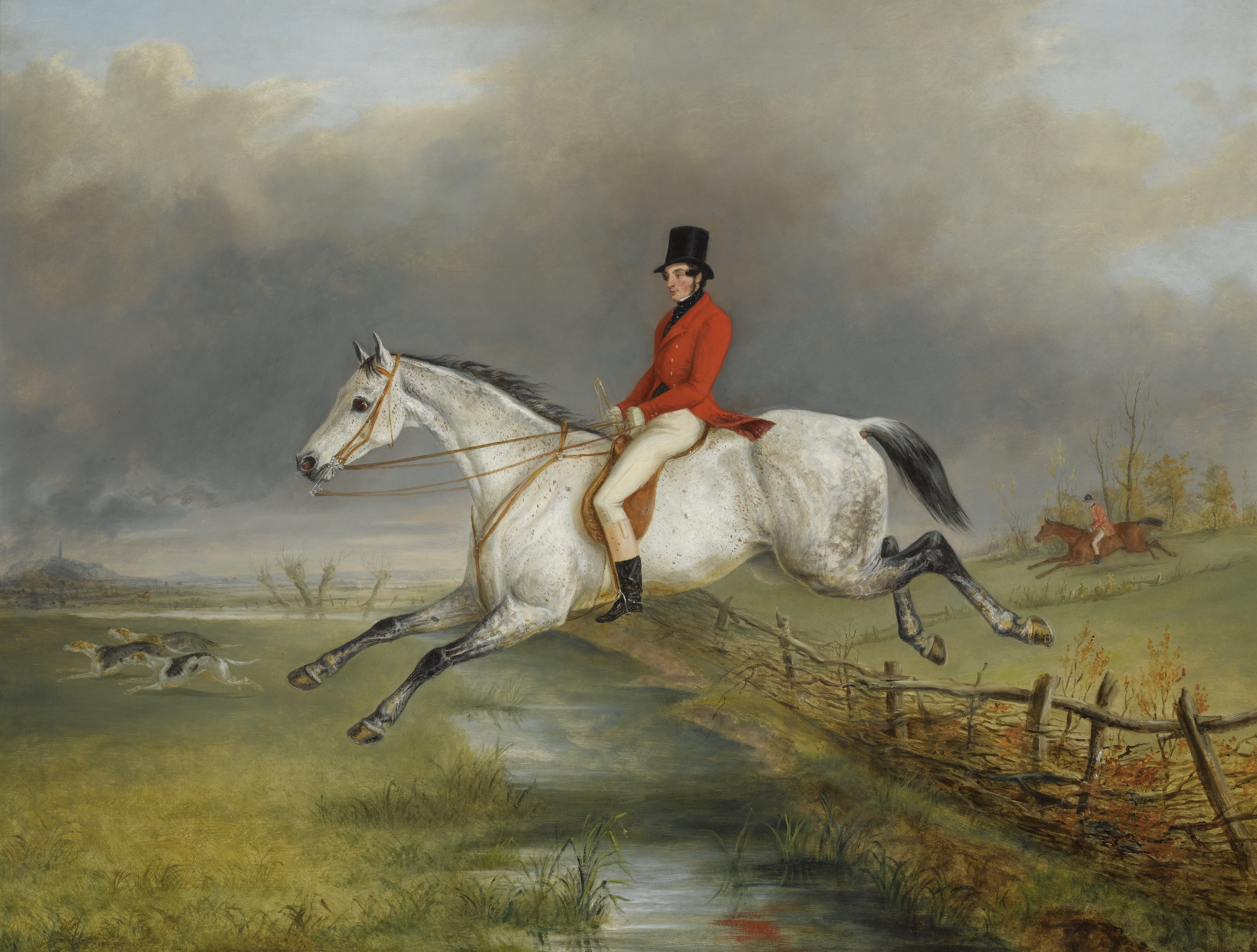
A Master of the Royal Buckhounds Clearing a Fence on a Grey Hunter.

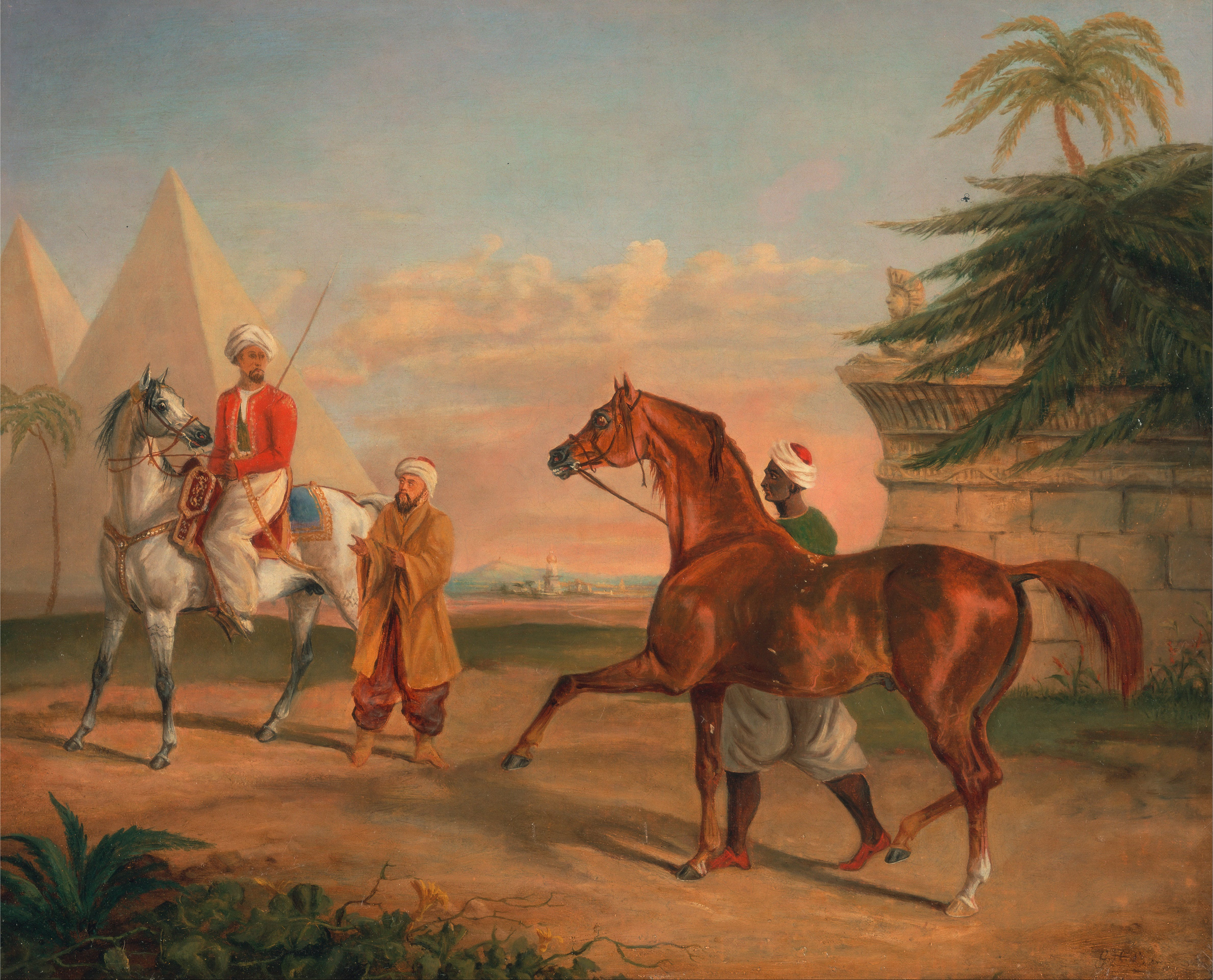
Mameluke Purchasing an Arabian Stallion.

George Henry Laporte (c. 1799, London (?) – 23 October 1873, London) was an English animal painter. He specialized in horses, mostly of the Arabian variety. His works depict scenes from hunting, racing and other sporting events, as well as animal still-lifes.

His birthplace is generally given as Hanover. This likely involves some confusion resulting from his employment with the King of Hanover, who was a member of the British royal family, as there appears to be no evidence that his parents were ever there or that he was adopted.

== Life and work ==
His father was John Laporte, a noted watercolorist and etcher of Huguenot descent, who was also his teacher.

His first exhibit came in 1818 at the British Institution. Later, he was one of the founding members of the Royal Society of British Artists and was a regular contributor to their exhibitions at the Suffolk Street Gallery. He also continued to exhibit at the Royal Academy, although the Society was meant to be an alternative to it.

In 1831, he became one of the first members of the Royal Institute of Painters in Water Colours, for which he provided clever sketches of hunting scenes and cavalry groups. Forty-three of his works were engraved and published in The Sporting Magazine, as well as several other journals.

Described as a man of great charm, he enjoyed a widespread patronage. He was appointed as an official animal painter to the Duke of Cumberland and his son, Prince George of Cumberland. A few of his paintings are in Orientalist style, set in Egypt, which suggests that he may have travelled there at some point.

He was a close associate of his fellow animal painter, Henry Bernard Chalon. His sister, Mary Ann Laporte, also became a painter of some note.

He died suddenly, at the approximate age of seventy-four.
