= George Garrard =

English painter (1760–1826)

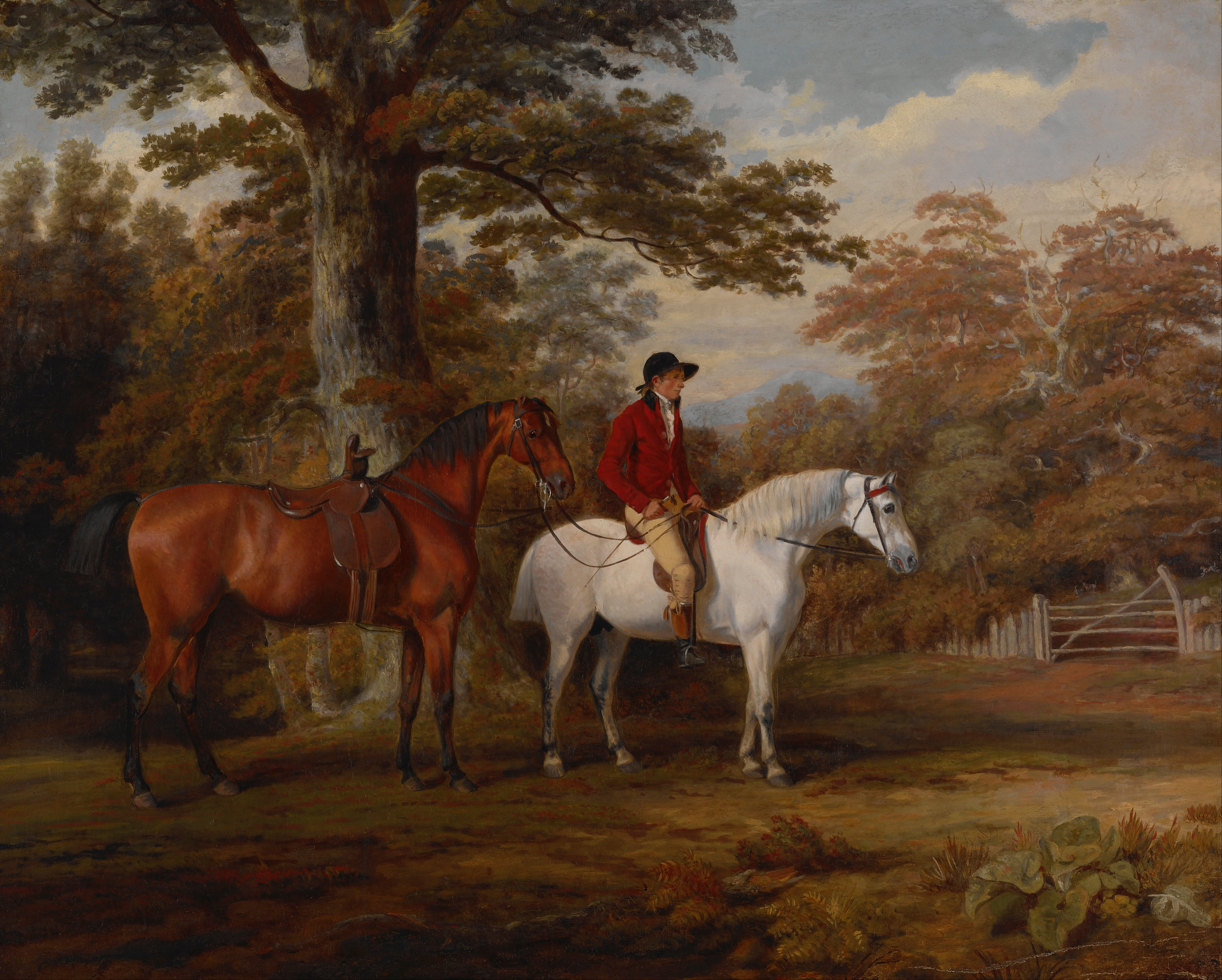
Hunter and Huntsman, 1785, Indianapolis Museum of Art.

George Garrard ARA (31 May 1760 – 8 October 1826) was an English animal, landscape and portrait painter, modeller, sculptor, engraver and printmaker. He played a major role in lobbying Parliament to introduce legislation to protect the copyright of works by modellers of animal and human figures.

== Life and work ==
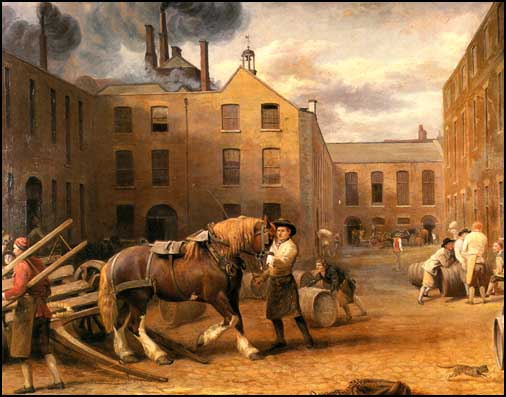
Whitbread's Brewery in Chiswell Street (1792)

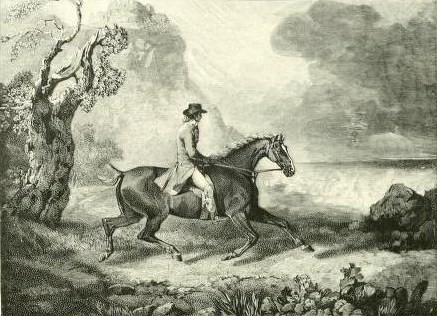
The 9th Duke of Hamilton and Brandon on a Cover Hack (wood engraving after Garrard, 1797)

Garrard came from a family of artists, tracing his descent back to Marcus Gheeraerts the Younger (c. 1561/62–1636) who was a painter to Queen Elizabeth I of England and her successor Anne of Denmark. He studied art first under a well-known drawing-master called Joseph Simpson, then with Sawrey Gilpin, and in 1778 became a student of the Royal Academy, where, in 1781, he first exhibited some pictures of horses and dogs. Three years later he sent with other pictures a "View of a Brewhouse Yard", which attracted the notice of Sir Joshua Reynolds, who commissioned him to paint a similar picture. In 1793 he exhibited "Sheep-shearing at Aston Clinton, Buckinghamshire", but early in 1795 it occurred to him that (plaster) models of cattle might be useful to landscape painters, and from this time he combined painting with modelling.

This led Garrard in 1797, with the concurrence of the Royal Academy and some of the leading sculptors of the day, to petition parliament in support of a bill for securing copyright on the works of modellers of human and animal figures. This resulted in the Copyright Act 1798 (38 Geo. 3. c. 71) - "An Act for encouraging the Art of making new Models and Casts of Busts, and other Things therein mentioned" ("The Models and Busts act"). Now, for the first time, British copyright law provided protection for a medium other than print.

In 1800 Garrard was elected an associate of the Royal Academy, and in the same year he published a folio volume with coloured plates, "A Description of the different varieties of Oxen common in the British Isles. In 1802 he exhibited "A Peasant attacked by Wolves in the Snow" but after 1804 he appears to have restricted himself almost entirely to sculpture and modelling.

Garrard painted both in oil and watercolours, and contributed also to the annual exhibitions of the Royal Academy busts, medallions, bas-reliefs, and groups of animals, such as "Fighting Bulls" and "An Elk pursued by Wolves", sometimes in marble or bronze, but more often in plaster. He exhibited in all 215 works at the Royal Academy, besides a few others at the British Institution and the Society of British Artists. He painted a large picture called "Woburn Sheep-shearing in 1804" and containing eighty-eight portraits of agricultural celebrities of the time (it was hung at one time in Woburn Abbey). The picture was engraved in aquatint by the artist himself.

He died at Queen's Buildings, Brompton, London, on the morning of Sunday 8 October 1826, while kneeling to pray in a church alongside his family. A chronological list of his paintings can be found in Walter Gilbey's Animal Painters, volume 1 (see "further reading").

== Family ==
Garrard married Matilda Gilpin, the eldest daughter of his mentor Sawrey Gilpin.

== Sculptural works ==
- Bust of Benjamin West (1803) exhibited at RA
- Bust of Henry Holland (1803) at Woburn Abbey
- Bust of Thomas Adkin (1803) at Southill, Bedfordshire
- Bust of Sir Joseph Banks (1804) at Burghley House
- Bust of Henry Holland (1806) at Southill, Bedfordshire
- Bust of Sawrey Gilpin (1806) at Burghley House
- Bust of the Earl of Egremont (1807) at Petworth
- Bust of Charles James Fox (1807) at Uppark
- Terracotta bust of Pitt (1808) in the Fitzwilliam Museum
- Bust of Humphrey Repton (1810) exhibited at RA
- Bust of William Wilberforce (1810) exhibited at RA
- Bust of Richard Brinsley Sheridan (1813) in the Soane Museum
