= Royal Watercolour Society =

Society of Painters in Water Colours founded in 1804 by William Frederick Wells

The Royal Watercolour Society is a British institution of painters working in watercolours. The Society is a centre of excellence for water-based media on paper, which allows for a diverse and interesting range of approaches to the medium of watercolour. Its members, or associates, use the post-nominal initials RWS and ARWS (associate member). They are elected by the membership, with typically half a dozen new associates joining the Society each year.

== History ==
The society was founded as the Society of Painters in Water Colours in 1804 by William Frederick Wells. Its original membership was William Sawrey Gilpin, Robert Hills, John Claude Nattes, John Varley, Cornelius Varley, Francis Nicholson, Samuel Shelley, William Henry Pyne and Nicholas Pocock. The members seceded from the Royal Academy where they felt that their work commanded insufficient respect and attention.

In 1812, the Society reformed as the Society of Painters in Oil and Watercolours, reverting to its original name in 1820.

In 1831 a schism created another group, the New Society for Painters in Water Colours (now the Royal Institute of Painters in Water Colours, and so the 1804 group became known as the Old Water Colour Society, and just the Old Society. Members were often referred to, and sometimes signed works, with the post-nominal "O.W.S.", and Associate members as "A.O.W.S.".

The Old Society obtained its Royal charter 1881 under the presidency of Sir John Gilbert as the Royal Society of Painters in Water Colours. In 1988, it changed its name again to the Royal Watercolour Society, by which it had previously been generally known.

== Current ==
The Royal Watercolour Society was founded to promote watercolour as a medium in all its applications. The Society defines a 'watercolour' as a work made in any water-based paint on paper. The RWS holds regular exhibitions presenting the finest in British contemporary works on paper. Exhibitions are held at Bankside Gallery and also tour outside London. The new RWS Gallery at Whitcomb Street opened its doors for a 'soft launch' in May 2022 with an exhibition of watercolours by RWS Member David Remfry. The RWS now holds exhibitions at both Bankside Gallery and the Whitcomb Street Gallery.

The 75 Members choose new Associates each year in a rigorous election procedure. Associates are entitled to use the initials ARWS after their names. Full membership is granted following a show of hands at an AGM. The Society's education programme includes practical courses tutored by members and drop-in family event days as well as talks and discussions. The archive and diploma collection is available for research.

Current or recent members include Sonia Lawson, Elizabeth Blackadder, Richard Bawden, Robin Richmond, and David Remfry.

The current president Charles Williams was elected in 2023.

== Presidents ==
- William Sawrey Gilpin (1804–1806)
- William Frederick Wells (1806–1807)
- John Glover (1808)
- Ramsay Richard Reinagle (1808–1812)
- Francis Nicholson (1812–1813)
- John Warwick Smith (1814)
- John Glover (1815)
- Joshua Cristall (1816)
- John Warwick Smith (1817–1818)
- Joshua Cristall (1819)
- George Fennell Robson (1820)
- Joshua Cristall (1821–1831)
- Anthony Van Dyke Copley Fielding (1831–1855)
- John Frederick Lewis (1856–1858)
- John Frederick Tayler (1858–1870)
- Sir John Gilbert (1871–1897)
- Sir Ernest Waterlow (1897–1913)
- Alfred Parsons (1913–1920)
- Sir Herbert Hughes-Stanton (1920–1936)
- Sir William Russell Flint (1936–1956)
- Thomas Carr (1936)
- Robert Austin (1957–1973)
- Andrew Freeth (1974–1976)
- Ernest Greenwood (1976–1984)
- Maurice Sheppard (1984–1987)
- Charles Bartlett (1987–1992)
- Leslie Worth (1992–1995)
- Richard Seddon (1995–1996)
- John Doyle (1996–2000)
- Francis Bowyer (2000–2003)
- Trevor Frankland (2003–2006)
- Richard Sorrell (2006–2009)
- David Paskett (2009–2012)
- Thomas Plunkett (2012–2017)
- Jill Leman (2017–2023)
- Charles Williams (2023–present)

== Bibliography ==
- Fenwick, S. & Smith, G. (1997). The Business of Watercolour: A Guide to the Archives of the Royal Watercolour Society. Ashgate. ISBN 1-85928-445-0.
- Roget, J.L. (1891). A History of the Old Water-Colour Society, now the Royal Society of Painters in Water Colours. 2 vols, London. fully available online

== See also ==
- Society of East Anglian Watercolourists, organized in 2007 with assistance from the Royal Watercolour Society
