= John Laporte (artist) =

British artist

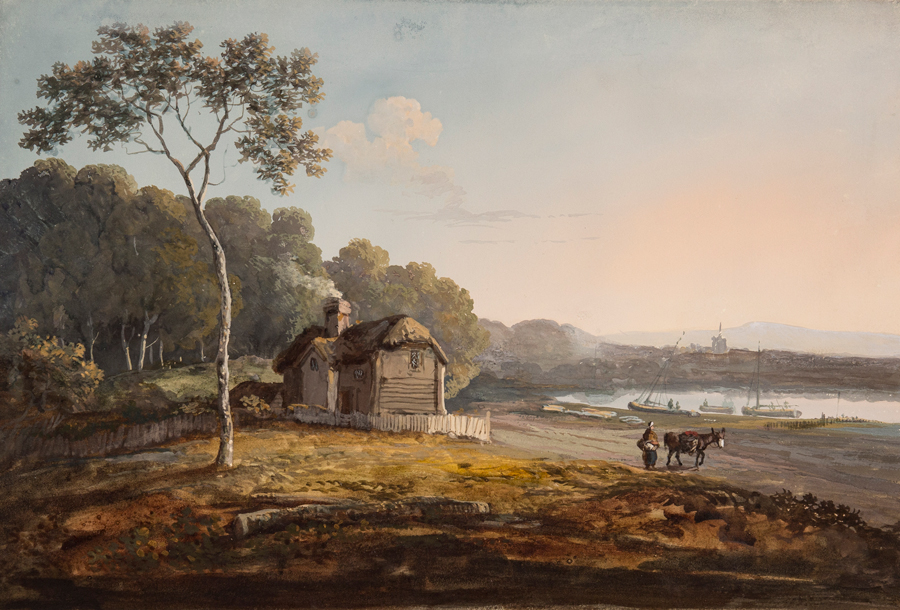
Cottage by an estuary, gouache, formerly in the collection of Henry Rogers Broughton, 2nd Lord Fairhaven

John Laporte (March 1761 – 8 July 1839) was an English landscape painter, mostly in watercolour, and etcher, who worked in and around London.

== Life and work ==
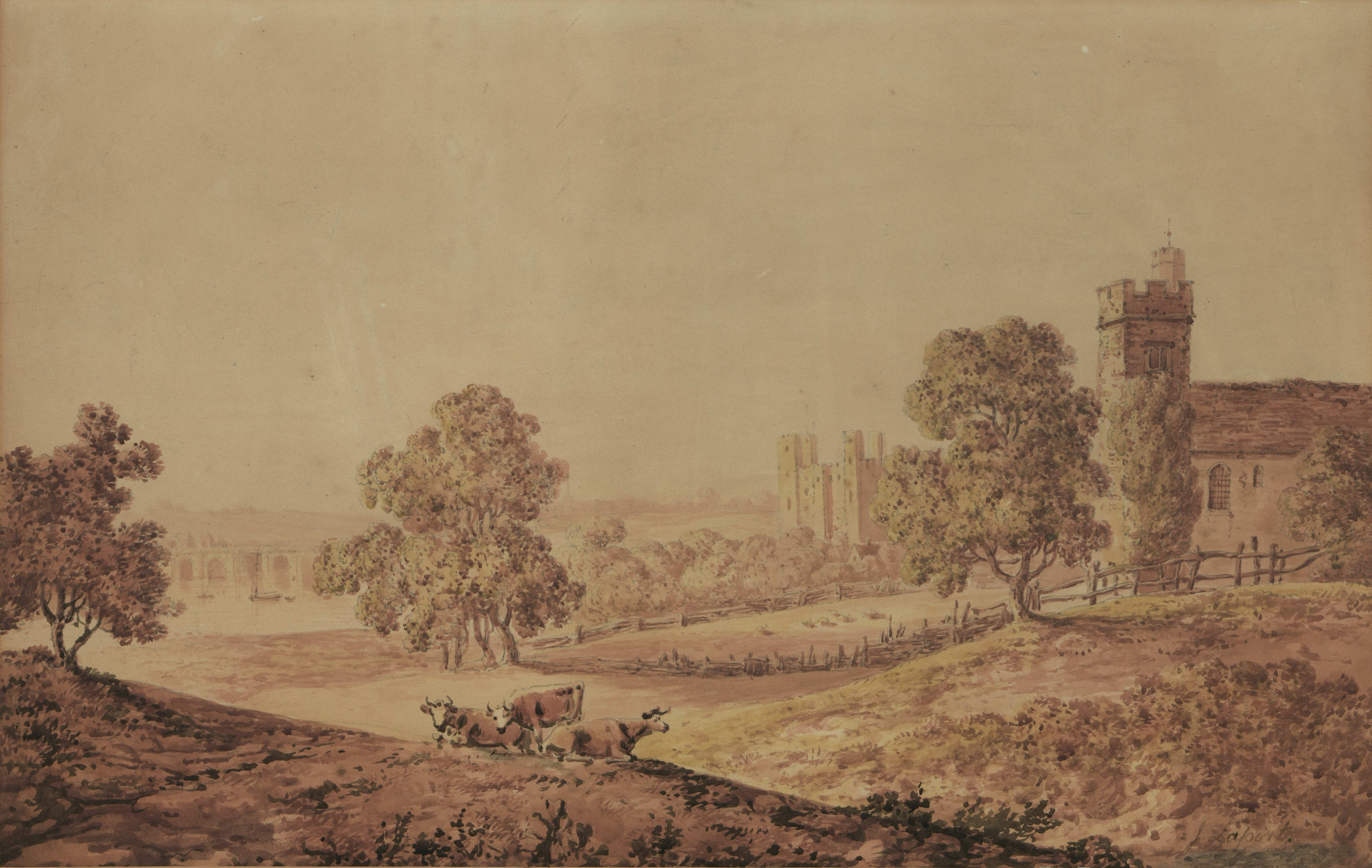
St Margaret's Church, Rochester, Aberdeen Archives, Gallery & Museums Collection

Laporte was born into a family of French Huguenot origins, possibly in London or in Ireland, and studied art under the Irish-born Huguenot painter John Melchior Barralet, either in London or Dublin. He became a drawing-master at the Addiscombe Military Seminary, Surrey. He was also a successful private teacher, and Dr. Thomas Monro (the patron of J. M. W. Turner amongst others), was one of his pupils. From 1785 he contributed landscapes to the Royal Academy and British Institution exhibitions in London, and was an original member of the short-lived society called 'The Associated Artists in Watercolours,' from which he retired in 1811. He also painted in oils.

Laporte published: Characters of Trees (1798–1801), Progressive Lessons sketched from Nature (1804), and The Progress of a Water-colour Drawing. Between 1801 and 1805 he and his collaborator William F. Wells made seventy-two soft-ground etchings after drawings by Thomas Gainsborough (thirty-three by Laporte, the remainder by Wells). They initially issued these etchings as individual plates, upon completion of each (thus bearing publication dates ranging from 1802 to 1805), and then as hand-coloured and bound sets under the title A Collection of Prints, illustrative of English Scenery, from the Drawings and Sketches of Gainsborough (circa 1805; reissued in 1819 by the publisher H.R. Young but with only around sixty-two plates and the original publication dates removed from these).

Laporte's Perdita discovered by the Old Shepherd was engraved by Bartolozzi, and his Millbank on the River Thames by Francis Jukes.

Laporte died in London on 8 July 1839, aged 78.

== Family ==
Laporte's daughter, Miss M. A. Laporte, exhibited portraits and fancy subjects at the academy and the British Institution from 1813 to 1822; in 1835 she was elected a member of the Institute of Painters in Watercolours, but withdrew in 1846.

His son, George Henry Laporte, was also an artist, who held the appointment of animal painter to the King of Hanover.

== Bibliography ==
- Laporte, John & Ibbetson, J. C. & Hassell, John. A Picturesque guide to Bath, Bristol Hot-Wells, the River Avon and the adjacent Country (1793)
- Laporte's Progress: The Life & Work of John Laporte by John Ramm [Antique Dealer & Collectors Guide, September 1996, Vol 50, 2]
