= William Nutter =

English engraver and draughtsman

William Nutter (c. 1759–1802) was an English engraver and draughtsman.

== Life ==
Born about 1759, Nutter became a pupil of John Raphael Smith. He worked exclusively as a stipple engraver, in the style of Francesco Bartolozzi.

Nutter exhibited some allegorical designs at the Royal Academy in 1782 and 1783. He died at his residence in Somers Town, 14 March 1802, in his 44th year, and was buried in the graveyard of Whitefield's Tabernacle, Tottenham Court Road.

== Works ==
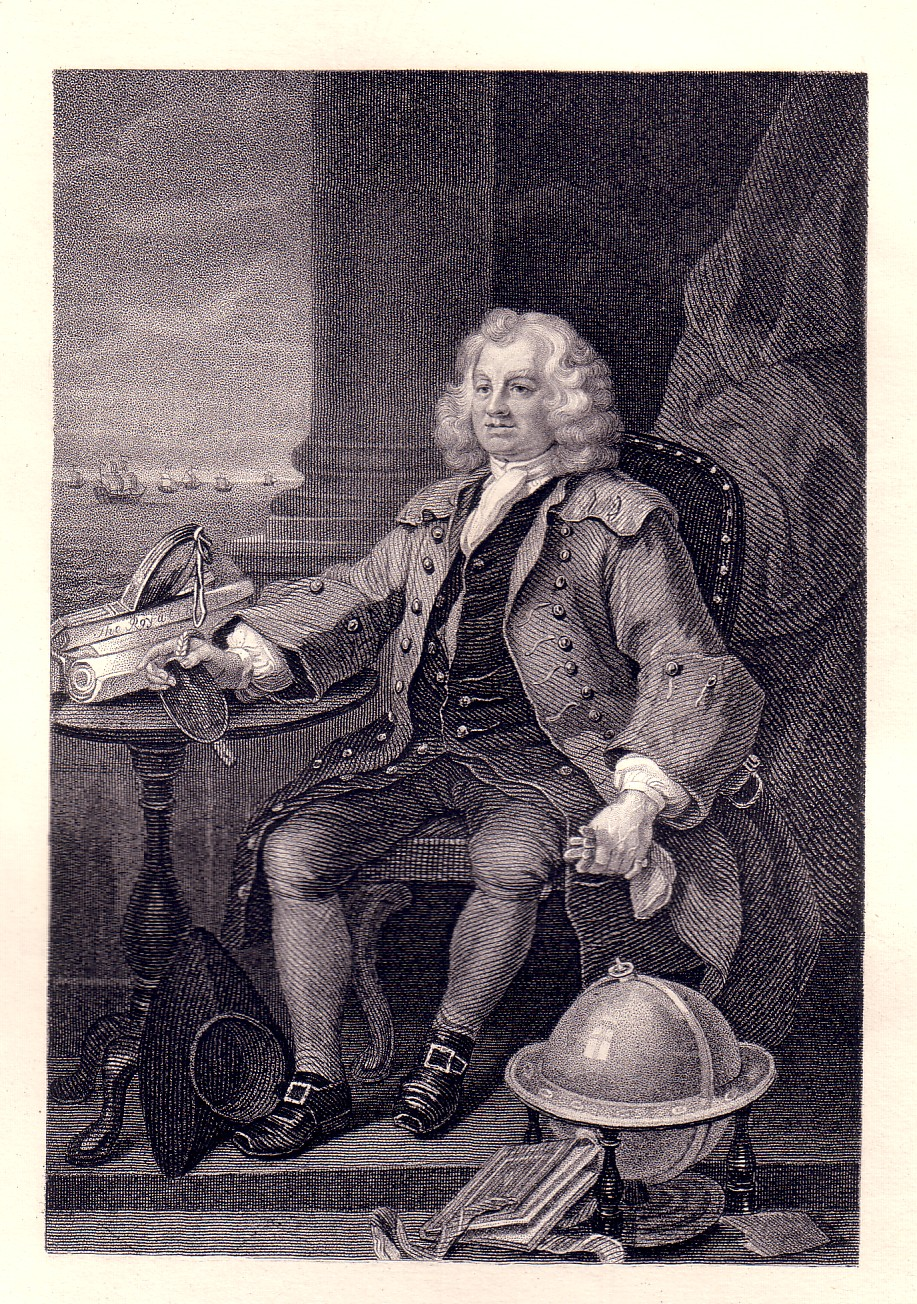
Thomas Coram, 1796 engraving by William Nutter after William Hogarth

Nutter's works are dated from 1780 to 1800. He executed plates after leading English artists of his time, a large proportion of them being from miniatures by Samuel Shelley. His works include:

- The Ale House Door and Coming from Market, after Henry Singleton;
- Celia overheard by Young Delvile, after Thomas Stothard;
- Saturday Evening, and Sunday Morning, after William Redmore Bigg;
- The Moralist, after John Raphael Smith;
- Burial of General Fraser, after John Graham;
- portraits of Princess Mary, after Johann Heinrich Ramberg;
- Captain Thomas Coram, after William Hogarth;
- Lady Beauchamp, after Joshua Reynolds;
- Mrs. Hartley, after Reynolds;
- Martha Gunn, after John Russell; and
- Lady E. Foster, Samuel Berdmore, and Nathaniel Chauncy after Samuel Shelley.

== Notes ==
Attribution

This article incorporates text from a publication now in the public domain: Lee, Sidney, ed. (1895). "Nutter, William". Dictionary of National Biography. Vol. 41. London: Smith, Elder & Co.
