= Robert Hills (artist) =

English painter

Robert Hills (26 June 1769 – 14 May 1844) was an English painter and etcher.

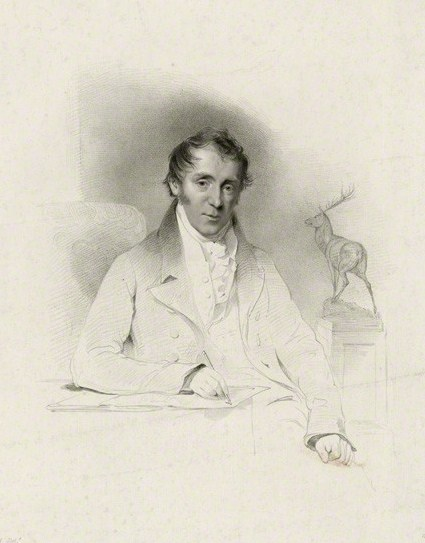
Portrait of Robert Hills by engraver William Thomas Fry, after John Jackson, National Portrait Gallery, London, 1823

Hills was born in Islington. He initially studied under John Alexander Gresse, then enrolled at the Royal Academy of Arts in 1788. He primarily painted rural scenes, particularly farm animals. A number of his renderings can now be found at the British Museum.

Hills was known to draw animals in works of other artists, such as George Barret, Jr. and George Fennell Robson. He published Sketches in Flanders and Holland (1816), with his own aquatints.

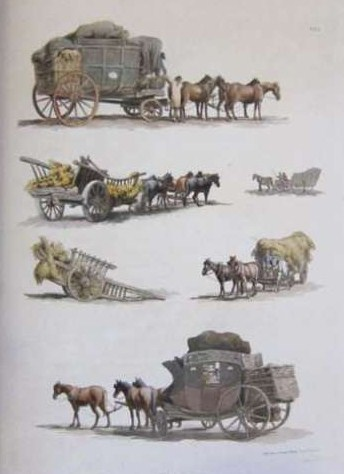
Plate from Sketches in Flanders and Holland (1816) by Robert Hills

== External links and references ==
- Engraving by Edward Francis Finden of the painting The Stag. with a poetical illustration by Letitia Elizabeth Landon in Forget Me Not annual for 1827.
