= George Robson (footballer, born 1897) =

English footballer

Personal information
- Full name: George Arnold Robson
- Date of birth: 22 April 1897
- Place of birth: Cambois, England
- Date of death: 1984 (aged 86–87)
- Position: Full-back

Senior career*
Years	Team	Apps	(Gls)
1913–1914	Cambois United		
1914–1915	Blyth Spartans		
1915	North Shields		
1915–1919	Raith Rovers		
1919	St Mirren		
1919–1926	South Shields	77	(0)
1926–1927	Southampton	0	(0)
1927–1929	Ashington	21	(0)
1930	Blyth Spartans		
Total		98	(0)
- * Club domestic league appearances and goals

George Arnold Robson (22 April 1897 – 1984) was an English footballer who played in the Football League for Ashington and South Shields.
