= John James Barralet =

Irish artist (1747–1815)

- Born: 1747; Dublin, Ireland
- Died: 16 January 1815 (aged 67–68); Philadelphia, United States

John James Barralet (c. 1747 – 16 January 1815) was an Irish artist who worked in watercolour and crayon. He spent the later part of his career in the United States working primarily producing engraving.

== Early life ==
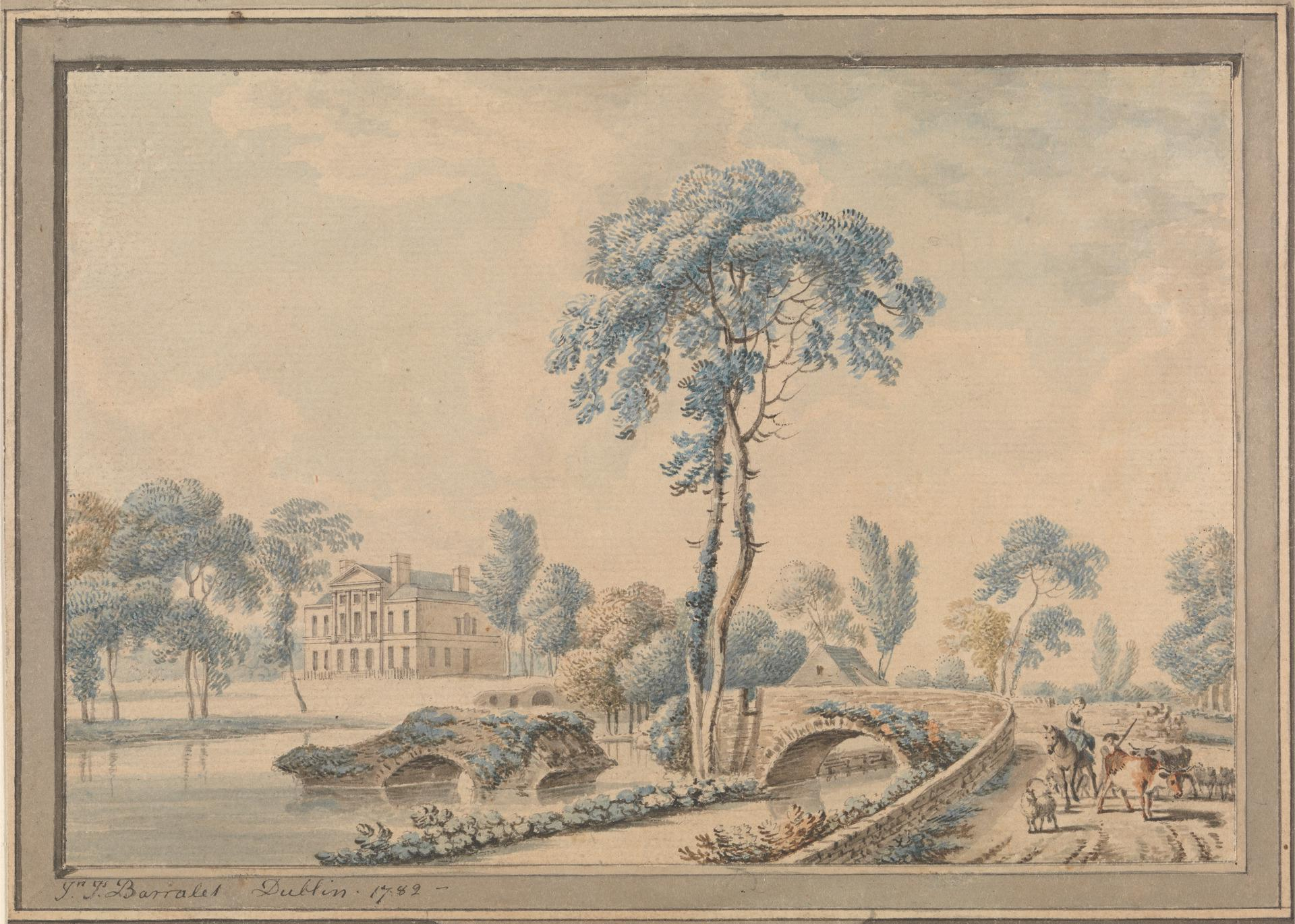
View of Lucan House - John James Barralet

John James Barralet was born around 1747 to a French Huguenot family in Dublin. He had at least two brothers, the artist John Melchior who practised in London and taught in The Royal Academy in 1770, and Joseph Barralet. His name is sometimes recorded as Barelet, Barolet, or Barrolet.

Barralet had joined two classes at The Dublin Society of Drawing schools aged seventeen and he was awarded premium in 1764. He was educated by James Mannin and Robert Lucius West. He was awarded prizes for both 'Drawing of human figures and heads' and 'Inventions in designs and patterns' in 1764, and another in 1766 for 'Original design in patterns'. He specialised in landscapes, producing prosaic works. He was lauded for his figures, which were said to give a lively immediacy to his watercolours. He also worked as a drawing teacher.

In June 1791, his drawings helped Benjamin Simpson win a competition to a design the gardens in Merrion Square.

He left Dublin for London sometime between 1766 and 1770, signing the "Rolls of declaration" supporting the Incorporated Society of Artists.

He exhibited three landscapes at the Royal Academy in 1770 and continued to exhibit there until 1776. He also showed work at the Society of Arts and the Society of Artists. He was elected fellow to the Society of Artists, and later served as director in 1777. He continued to teach in London, having drawing schools on James's Street, Golden Square in 1773, and St Alban's Street, Pall Mall in 1777. He was among a group of artists pioneering small full-length watercolour portraits on paper at this time.

Barralet returned to Dublin in 1779 on the advice of a dying Mannin, with Barralet appointed his replacement temporarily at the Dublin Society's School for Ornament Drawing, serving in that role after Mannin's death in June 1779. Despite his connections and being well regarded in the school, he was defeated in the election to the permanent role by William Waldron in November 1779. He was awarded £45 "in consideration of his great merit as an artist; and his diligence and attention in superintending the said school." During this time he lived in George's Court, South Cumberland Road, and Ballsbridge

He accompanied Gabriel Beranger on a tour of Counties Wicklow and Wexford in 1780, with a resulting 23 of his drawings engraved for Francis Grose's Antiquities of Ireland. He exhibited with the Society of Artists Exhibition, while also working as painting scenes at the Crow Street Theatre and working for Richard Hand and Thomas Chebsey at their glass staining business. John Foster commissioned him to paint his family at their newly built home, Oriel Temple, County Louth in 1786, and he later worked as drawing-master to the family of Randal MacDonnell, 6th earl of Antrim.

== Later life in the United States ==
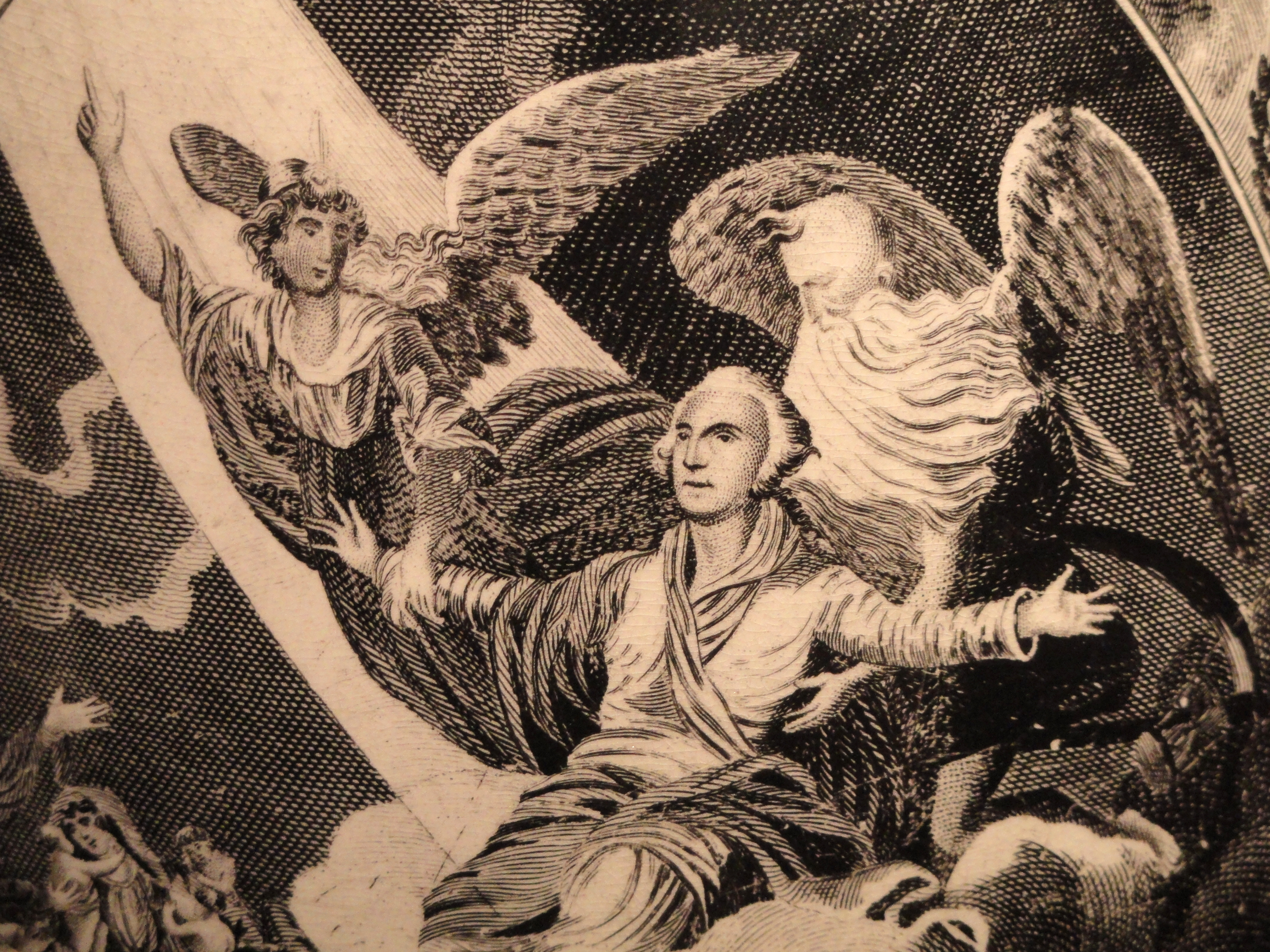
Detail of the Apotheosis of George Washington by John James Barralet, c. 1800–1805, transfer-printed onto a pitcher by the Herculaneum Pottery, Liverpool

In December 1795 he emigrated to America, settling in Philadelphia. Barralet engraved a few plates, but more frequently produced designs for other engravers to execute. He worked briefly with the engraver Alexander Lawson. His most famous works are engravings of George Washington, including 'The apotheosis of Washington' to mark Washington's death. In 1798 he designed the membership certificate for the Hibernian Society in the city. He took on the post of professor of drawing from the antique at the Academy of Art in Philadelphia in 1811. He is credited with inventing a ruling machine for engravers, and an ink for copperplate prints.

Barralet has been described as "a highly irritable and eccentric individual, very difficult to manage." He is anecdotally reported to have locked his two young sons in a closet so that they would not disturb him while he sketched the French general Jean Victor Marie Moreau, who was visiting Philadelphia at the time. His American friends also noted he was "a man of talent without discretion or anything like common prudence; prodigally generous, and graspingly poor" known for his unkempt appearance and eccentric manner.

Barralet married twice. With his second wife, he had at least two sons who predeceased him. Barralet died in Philadelphia on 16 January 1815.
