= George Barret Jr. =

English painter

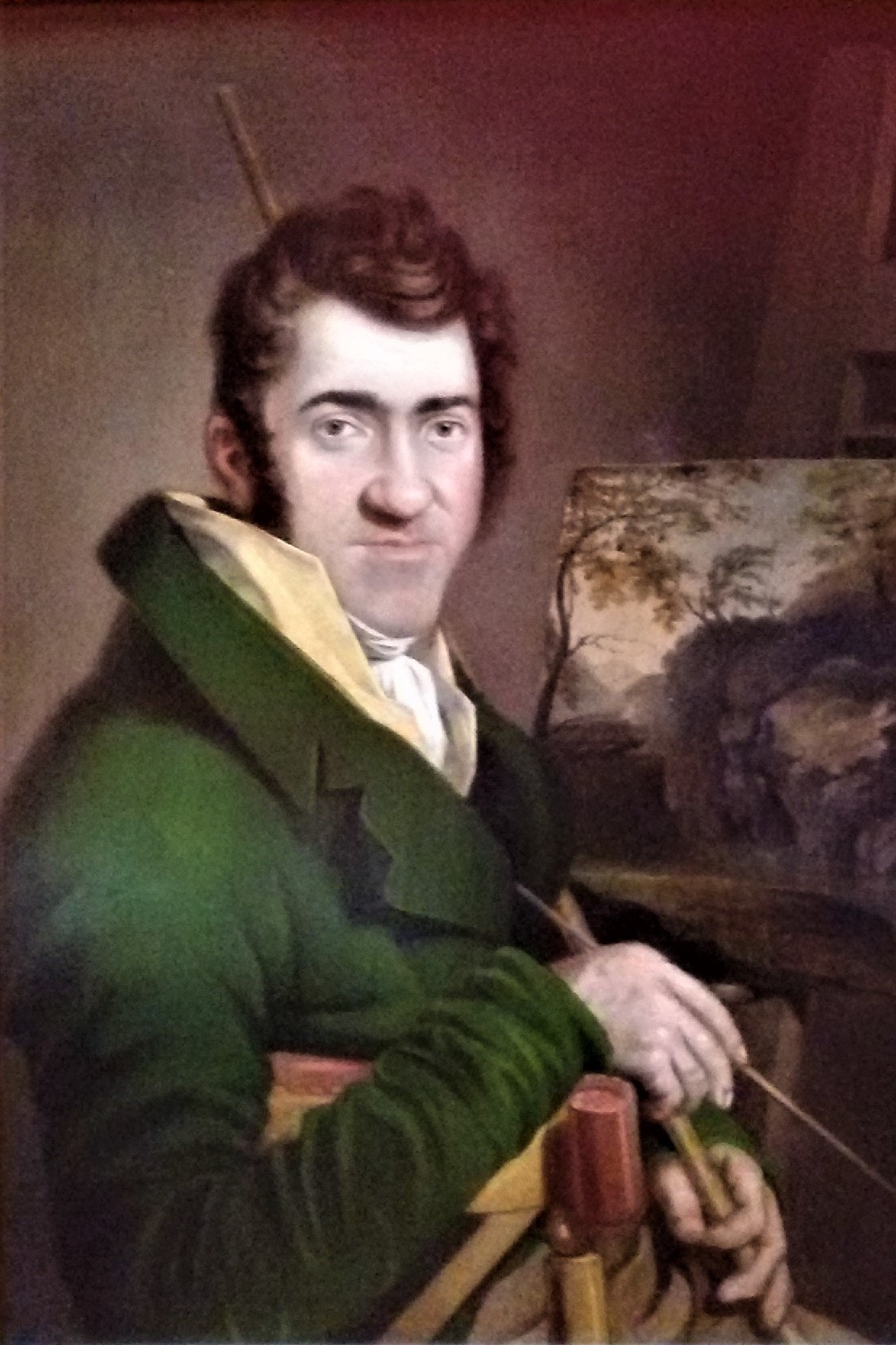
Self portrait, George Barret Jr.

George Barret Jr. (1767–1842), sometimes referred to as George Barret the Younger, was an English landscape painter, and a son of the Irish artist George Barret Sr.

== Life ==
Almost certainly taught by his father, he exhibited at the Royal Academy from 1800 to 1803. He was an early member of the Society of Painters in Water Colours when it was founded in 1804, and exhibited prolifically, never missing an exhibition for 38 years. Little is known of his early years, except that in 1767 he was born in Orchard Street in London, off Portman Square, where his father lived after moving from his native Ireland. Throughout his life, he rarely left London apart from sketching excursions in the Home Counties. George Barret was seventeen when he and his brothers and sisters were left fatherless, and had to support themselves by their own efforts. Three of them, beside himself, took to the practice of art, but George was by far the most gifted artistically.

His earlier works were views of the Thames Valley and Home Counties and a few of Wales, but he increasingly turned to romantic compositions of a Claudian type showing poetic sunrises and sunsets without reference to locality. These early works were mainly topographical views in oil, but after he helped found the Water-Colour Society he turned to watercolour. Later on he became influenced by ideal landscape painters such as Claude Lorrain. From time to time Barret collaborated with other artists, notably Joshua Cristall around 1830, and in 1840 he published The Theory and Practice of Water-Colour Painting. A truly visionary painter, his artistic power remained unimpaired to the last, even though his life was one long struggle against financial ruin.

He lived most of his life in Paddington, where he died on 19 March 1842. Like his father before him, he died destitute. He was buried in the ancient churchyard of St. Mary's, Paddington.

== List of Artworks ==
- Lake Scene, Oil on Canvas. Held by The Wilson in Cheltenham.
- Returning from Work, Oil on Canvas. Held by the Victoria & Albert Museum.
- Italianate Landscape with Shepherds, Oil on Canvas. Held by the Victoria & Albert Museum.
- Landscape with Classical Ruins, Figures and Goats, Oil on Canvas. Held by the Victoria & Albert Museum.
- Bacchus Enthroned Served by Boys with Attendant Bacchantes, Oil on Canvas. Held by the National Trust at Attingham Park near Shrewsbury.
- Landscape (The Return Home), watercolour, pencil, ink & gum arabic on paper. Held by the Oldham Gallery.
- View of Hampstead, London, watercolour on paper. Held by the Somerset Heritage Centre.
- The Return Home, watercolour, bodycolour & gum arabic on paper. Held by the Oldham Gallery.
- Landscape in the Isle of Wight, pen & ink, watercolour on paper. Held by The Courtauld, London.
- Wooden Bridge, watercolour on paper. Held by the Royal Watercolour Society.
- Classical Composition with Peacock, watercolour, gouache & pencil on paper. Held by Manchester Art Gallery.
- The Sketcher, Oil on Panel. Held by Manchester Art Gallery.
- View from Richmond Hill, Surrey, Oil on Canvas. Held by Orleans House Gallery.
- Laying Foundation Stone of Plymouth Breakwater, Oil on Canvas. Held by The Box, Plymouth.
