= George Barret Sr. =

Irish landscape artist (1730–1784)

George Barret (Senior)
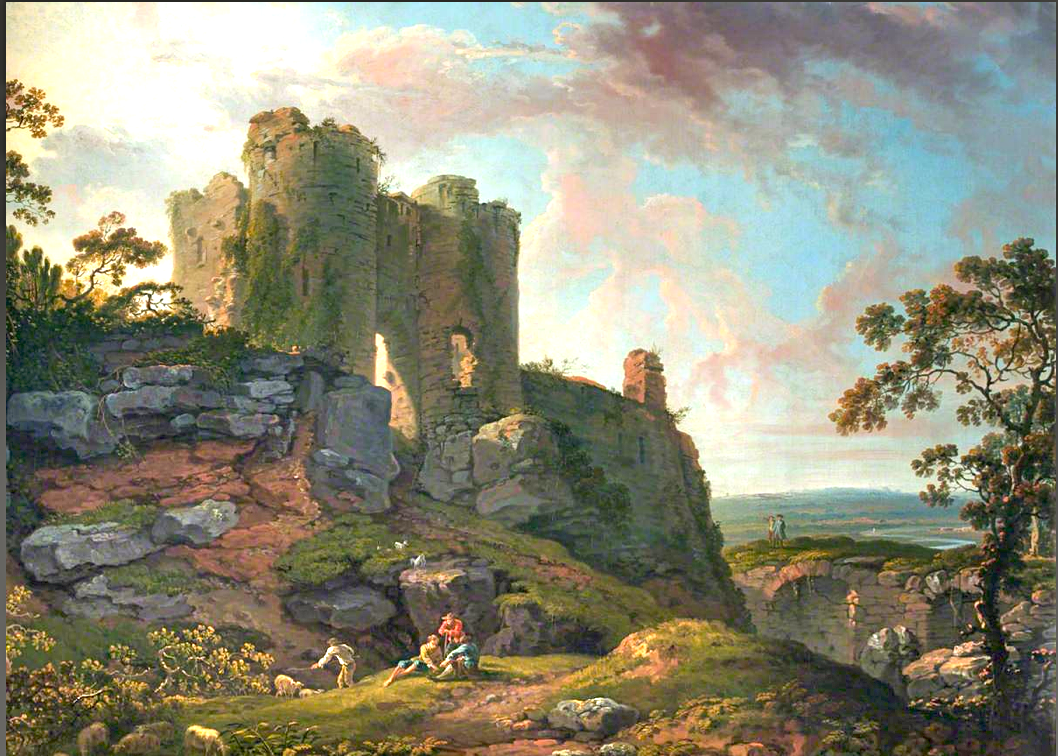
- Beeston Castle, Cheshire, c. 1770
- Born: George Barret; Either 1728 or 1732; The Liberties, Dublin, Kingdom of Ireland
- Died: 29 May 1784; Paddington, London, England, United Kingdom of Great Britain and Ireland
- Education: Robert West and James Mannin
- Known for: Landscape paintings
- Movement: Founding member of the Royal Academy
- Patrons: Lord Powerscourt, William Cavendish-Bentinck, 3rd Duke of Portland William Lock of Norbury Park, William Constable of Burton Constable.

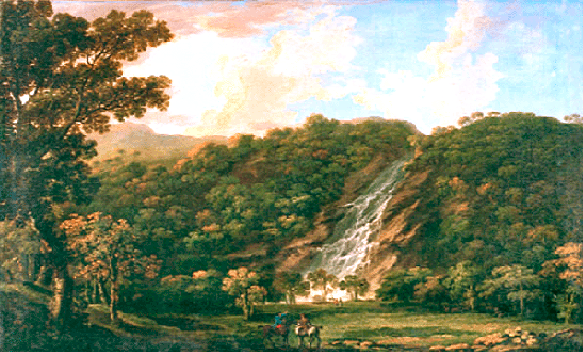
Powerscourt Waterfall by George Barret c. 1755

George Barret Sr. RA (c. 1730 – 29 May 1784) was an Irish landscape artist known for his oil paintings and watercolours. He left Ireland in 1762 to establish himself as an artist in London and quickly gained recognition to become a leading artist of the period. He exhibited at the Society of Artists of Great Britain and was able to gain patronage from many leading art collectors. Barrett with other leading members left the Society in 1768 to found the Royal Academy, where he continued to exhibit until 1782.

Barrett appears to have travelled extensively in England including the Lake District and the Isle of Wight, Wales, and Scotland to undertake commissions for his patrons, but he does not appear to have travelled abroad. Oil paintings of Tivoli in Italy have been attributed to him, but it is much more likely that they are the work of his son George Barret Jr. He suffered from asthma and this caused him to move in 1772 to Westbourne Green, at the time a country village to the west of Paddington.

While he earned considerable wealth from his paintings, he has been described as being "feckless" with money. He was helped in 1782 by Edmund Burke, with whom he had become friends when Burke attended Trinity College, Dublin. On Burke's recommendation he obtained the appointment of master painter of Chelsea Hospital, a post he held until his death in 1784. At the time of his death his widow and children we left destitute, but the Royal Academy granted her a pension of thirty pounds a year.

== Life ==
=== Early life in Ireland ===
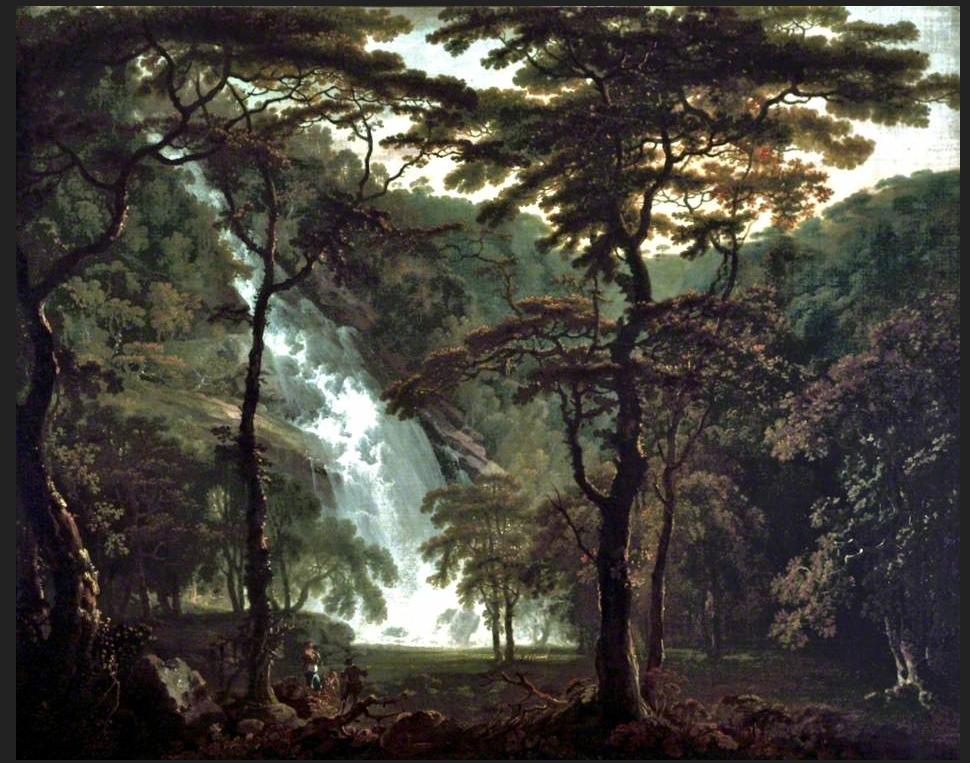
Powerscourt waterfall. This painting probably owned by Edmund Burke, and is now in the Walker Art Gallery, Liverpool

Born in Dublin, the son of a cloth merchant, some time between 1728 and 1732, Barret began his career apprenticed to a staymaker. By 1747 he had started learning to draw at Robert West's academy at George's Lane which was sponsored by Dublin Society, and later studied under James Mannin.

After completing his studies he taught drawing at the Academy. He was a friend of Edmund Burke while Burke was an undergraduate at Trinity College, Dublin. In 1757 Burke published A Philosophical Enquiry into the Origin of Our Ideas of the Sublime and Beautiful, and the influence of Burke's thinking can be detected in some of Barret's early paintings, such as the Powerscourt Waterfall. A version of this painting in the Walker Art Gallery in Liverpool is said to have been painted for Edmund Burke.

=== Italianate paintings ===
Early in his career Barret produced many oil paintings of classical scenery, often incorporating mythological figures. There is no evidence that he travelled to Italy. Most, if not all, of the paintings appear to have been commissioned for houses in Ireland. Thomas Bodkin considered that the oil paintings of Tivoli in Italy to be more likely to be work of his son George Barret junior. who also produced many works with classical themes. However, these can now be securely attributed to the elder Barret.

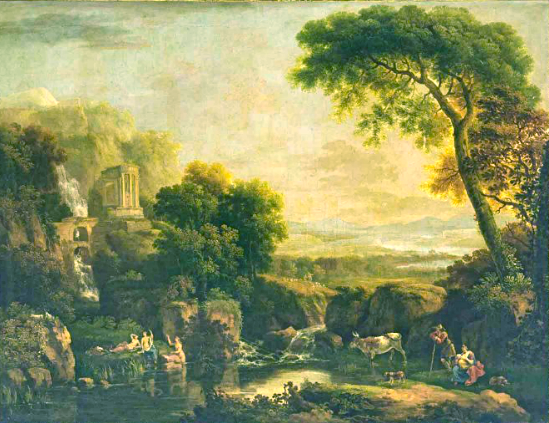
An Italianate wooded river landscape after Claude Lorrain's Landscape with Argus guarding Io c. 1750

A source of Barret's earliest landscape paintings came from the re-working of engravings of classical Italianate scenes of artists such as Claude Lorrain. A pair of paintings sold in 2013, came from the collection of the Rev. Samuel Madden (1686–1765). Madden established a series of prizes at Trinity College, Dublin, to reward agricultural and artistic enterprise, designed an important landscape garden on the shores of Lough Erne, founded the Dublin (later Royal) Society, and left an important collection of 17th- and 18th-century Italian pictures to Trinity College. These two paintings were based on engravings of two paintings by Claude Lorrain. One of these is after Landscape with a rural dance, which belonged to the Duke of Kingston. The second is a Landscape with Argus guarding Io, purchased by the first Earl of Leicester and still at Holkham Hall, in which Barret has reversed the image in his painting. There are a number of other Italianate paintings showing ruins which Barret probably painted before developing his series of Irish landscapes.

Barret's first major patron was probably Joseph Leeson, 1st Earl of Milltown, who built the Palladian mansion, Russborough House in the southern part of County Wicklow.Richard Cassels was the architect and the house was furnished by Joseph Leeson, who travelled on grand tours of Europe in 1744 and again in 1750, amassing a large art collection of paintings, sculpture, furniture, and antiques. This was augmented by classical landscapes and local landscapes. Barret's paintings were used as a decorative scheme in the newly created dining room Many of Barret's paintings passed with the Milltown bequest to the National Gallery of Ireland in 1902. Another source that was used extensively by Barret were engravings by Piranesi which were published in 1748 in Antichita romane de' tempi della Repubblica, e de' primi imperatori. A landscape commissioned by Lord Bective for Headfort, Kells, Couty Meath is based on the Tempietto del Clitunno a temple on the river Clitunnonear Spoleto, in central Umbria, north of Rome.

=== Irish patrons ===
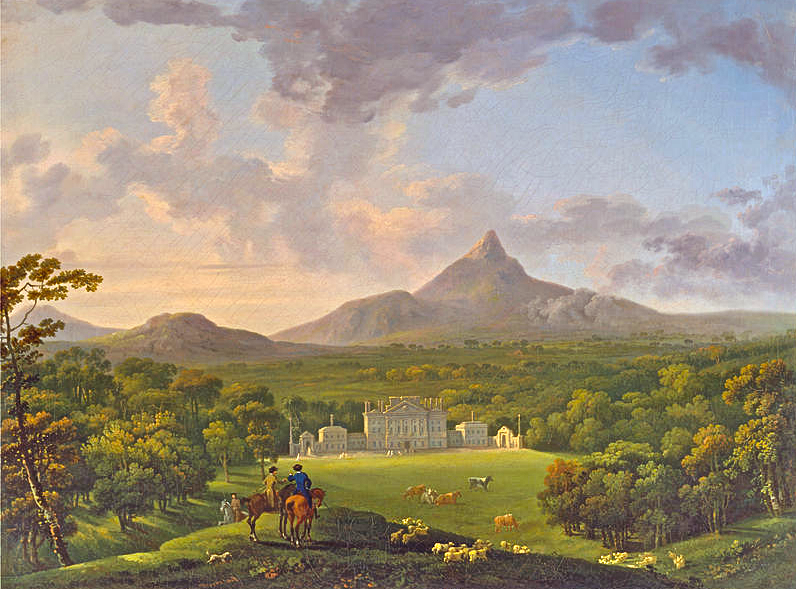
George Barret, Powerscourt House, County Wicklow with the Sugarloaf mountain

Following work for Samuel Madden and the Earl of Milltown, Barret started to produce paintings of Irish landscapes. These portrayed the actual landscape and not capriccio scenery. This was a natural progression from his previous idealised Italianate scenery. Barret is particularly associated with Edward Wingfield who in 1751 became Viscount Powerscourt. Wingfield owned Powerscourt House and extensive estates to the south of Dublin in County Wicklow. These included the scenic river Dargle with its craggy red rocks and impressive Powerscourt Waterfall that is the second highest in Ireland. Scenery on the Dargle often figures in Barret's surviving oil paintings and he also painted at Avoca in the south of County Wicklow. A View of Powerscourt House under the Sugar Loaf Mountain is now at the Yale Center for British Art, and a version of Barret's Powerscourt Waterfall is in the National Gallery of Ireland.

Barret was likely introduced to the Marquess of Rockingham by Edmund Burke, who had become his private secretary. The Marquess' s Irish seat was at Coolatin, County Wicklow. Barret was employed to draw the remains of Killtimon Castle, County Wicklow, and a copy after his drawing survives in the Royal Irish Academy An oil painting by Barret, with a wooded mountainous river landscape with anglers by a waterfall in the foreground and a ruined tower house in the distance, which relates to these views, was sold in 2003.

A further Irish patron of Barret was the Thomas Conolly of Castletown House of Celbridge to the west of Dublin. He inherited Castletown House in 1758 and his wife Lady Louisa Conolly (who was the daughter of Charles Lennox, 2nd Duke of Richmond), set about redecoration and refurbishment of this Palladian mansion. Barret supplied a painting of the house in the distance with wooded parkland and a river. The trees are depicted in outline and not in Barret's later spindly way. John Harris remarks that it is softly and atmospherically painted, and of course, is free from the influence of Wilson and other London based painters. As he could not find adequate employment in Ireland, Barret moved to London in 1762.

=== Move to England and patronage ===
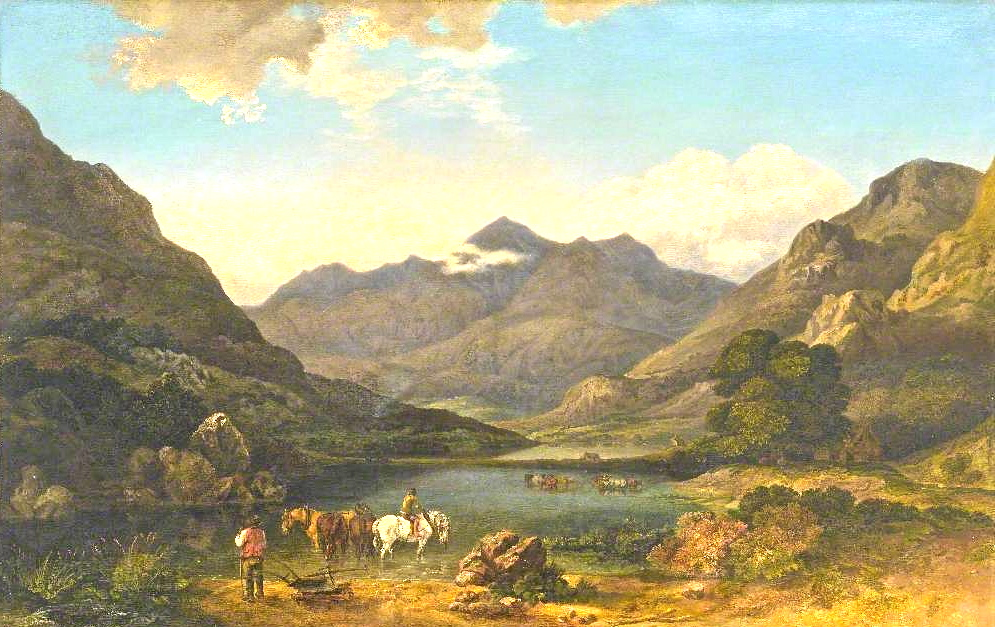
Snowden from Llyn Nantle by George Barret senior

Following his move to London in 1762 Barrett rapidly established himself as the leading landscape artist working in oil paint. In 1764 he was exhibiting at both the Free Society of Artists and the Society of Artists of Great Britain. Barret was awarded the premium prize of 50 guineas for the Large Landscape with Figures which he exhibited at the Free Society exhibition in 1764, and this was purchased a year later by the Marquess of Rockingham for £100 guineas. At the Society of Artists he displayed four paintings including views on the Dargle and Powerscourt Waterfall, paintings that he must have brought with him from Ireland.

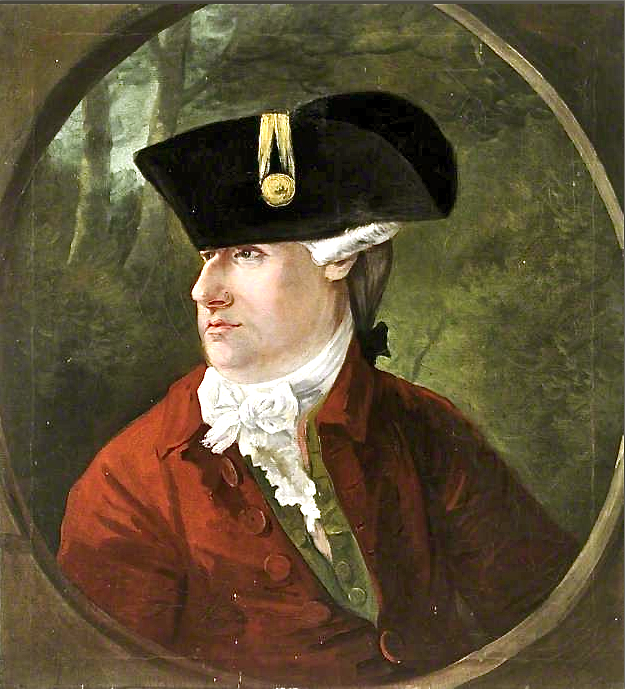
William Constable of Burton Constable Hall, George Barret

In 1768 a rift developed in the Society of Artists of Great Britain. A faction led by Sir William Chambers, at the suggestion of Barret, petitioned the King for the foundation of the Royal Academy. Barret is mentioned as a nominated member in the foundation document. Barret specialised particularly in wild and mountainous natural landscapes; of the 31 paintings he showed at the Royal Academy between 1769 and 1782, more than a third depicted such scenery. He very occasionally undertook portraits, an example of which is the portrait of William Constable at Burton Constable Hall. He also painted a number of pictures of animals such as the water spaniel belonging to Lord Edward Bentinck, that was exhibited at the Society of Artists of Great Britain in 1768.

On arriving in London Barret was able to build on the contacts that he had made in Ireland and particularly with the political faction that had grown up around Marquess of Rockingham known as the Rockinghamites or Rockingham Whigs. Rockingham was to become prime minister in 1765–1766 and again in 1782. The connection was through Edmund Burke, Rockingham's private secretary and prominent Rockinghamites who commissioned paintings from Barrett were the Duke of Portland, the Earl of Albemarle and Sir George Colebrook. His patrons were mainly the rich landowner who wished to have their estates and parks recorded. Barret soon found himself with numerous commissions and it was rumoured that he was earning up £2000 a year, a princely sum for an artist at the time. Contemporary accounts suggest that Barret was a highly sociable character and got on well with people and other artists. Even though Richard Wilson made disparaging remarks about both Barret and Gainsborough at the same time, Bodkin maintains that Wilson and Barret were personal friends. It is noticeable that many of the landowners who patronised Barret were in the process of building impressive new mansions which would require large oil paintings to decorate the reception rooms. The Duke of Portland at Welbeck Abbey, Sir Peter Byrne Leicester at Tabley House and the Marquess of Rockingham were all employing Carr of York as an architect and this may provide a link between his early commissions after Barret arrived from Ireland.

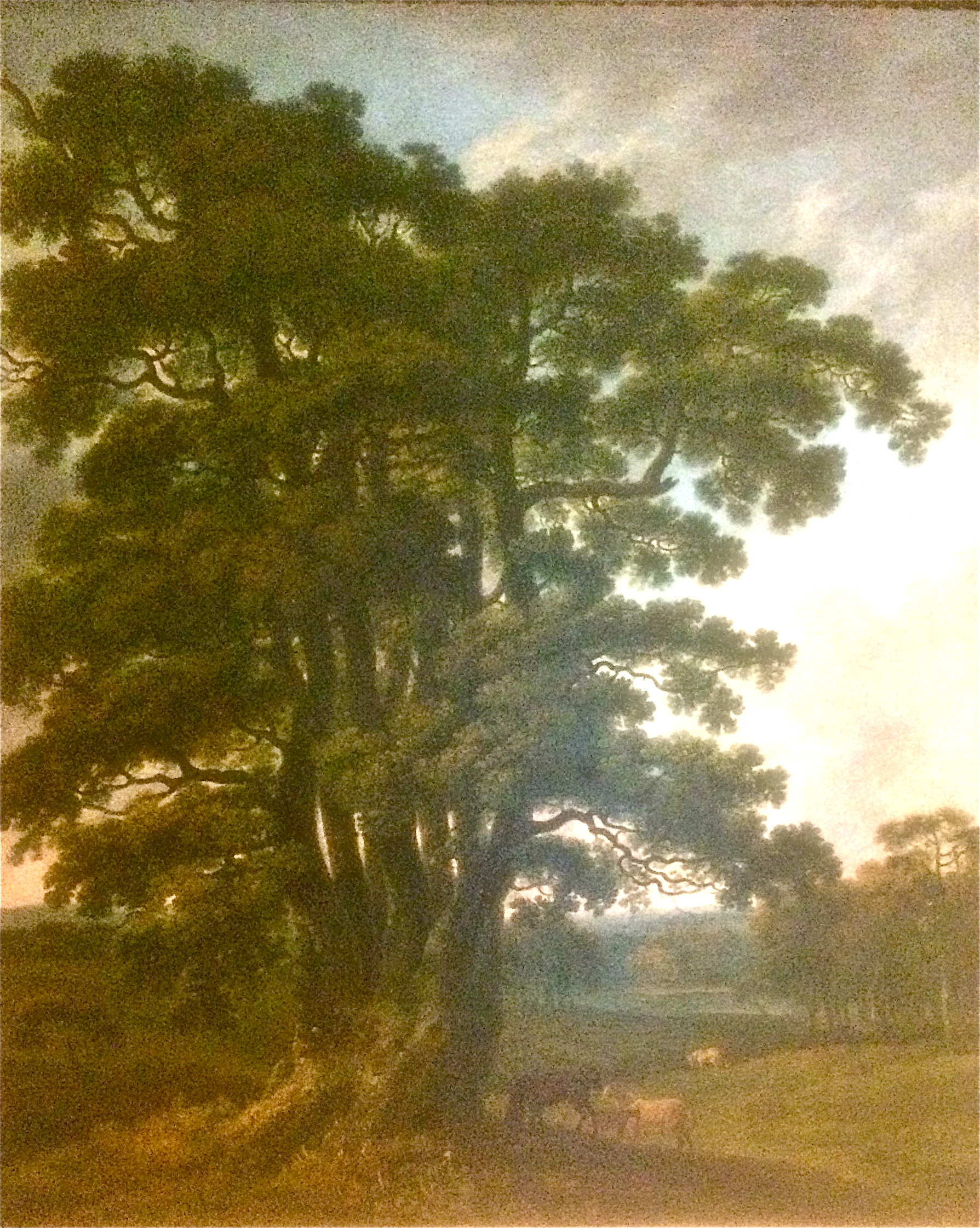
The Severn Sisters oak in Welbeck Park by George Barrett 1765–1766

The Duke of Portland commissioned a dozen paintings of trees and the landscape at Welbeck Abbey from Barrett. The paintings were undertaken between 1765 and 1771 and Barret was paid 80 guineas for the largest paintings, 60 guineas for the middle sized and 40 guineas for the smaller paintings. Most of these paintings are now on display at the Portland Gallery at Welbeck.

==== Sir Peter Byrne Leicester. ====
The catalogue of paintings in the collection of Sir John Leicester of Tabley House near Knutsford that was published in 1821 includes a sketch of a painting by Barret. The painting has not been traced, but it shows a view of Beeston Castle from a distance. It could be that this painting was originally a pair with the painting by Barret of the gate towers at Beeston Castle in the Grosvenor Museum. Sir John Fleming Leicester, who was a great collector of paintings, may well have inherited this painting from his father Sir Peter Byrne Leicester. If this is the case it could provide an Irish connection between Leicester and Barret. (Sir Peter Byrne Leicester was the son of Sir John Byrne, Bt., of Timogue, County Laois, by his wife Meriel (nee Leicester). Aged 10 he inherited a large Cheshire estate through the maternal line and two years later in 1744 legally took the Leicester surname.) Sir Peter Byrne Leicester inherited these estates which are close to the Powerscourt Estates, so providing a possible link for the commissioning of the Beeston Castle painting.

Barret painted for the Duke of Buccleuch from about 1768 to 1771. These were probably for Dalkeith Palace. Barret exhibited Part of Melrose Abbey by Moonlight at the Royal Academy in 1769, which is now at Drumlanrig Castle. Ellis Waterhouse notes seven views of Dalkeith Park by Barret in the Buccleuch collection at Bowhill, Selkirk. These, Waterhouse remarks, are his most memorable surviving works. They were a conscious attempt at providing a native British type of landscape composition in opposition to Richard Wilson's Italianising patterns.

George Keppel, 3rd Earl of Albemarle, a noted military commander and another prominent member of the Rockingham Whigs was also a patron of Barret. Albemarle lived at Bagshot Park on the Crown Estate to the south of Windsor. Albemarle had Bagshot Park remodelled for him by James Paine between 1766 and 1772. One of the painting he commissioned was The Long Walk, Windsor, with Brood Mares and Foals, which included the famous racehorse Eclipse. This painting became part of the John Julius Angerstein collection and was purchased at auction for Queen Victoria in 1883.

He appears to have been commissioned a number of paintings for the Lowther family, of scenes in the vicinity of Lowther Castle in Westmorland. These include A view looking east towards Knipe Scar from Lowther Park, where the sportsmen in the painting were the work of Philip Reinagle and the dogs are by George Stubbs.

Sir George Colebrooke of Gatton Park in Surrey commissioned at least two paintings from Barret. Colebrooke was a London banker and also became chairman of the East India Company. He became the Member of Parliament for the rotten borough of Gatton in 1754 as a member of the Whig party and held office under the Marquess of Rockingham. However, his financial speculations led to his downfall and he was declared bankrupt in 1777. Sir George Colebrook had commissioned Capability Brown in 1762 to landscape Gatton and a painting by Barret, sold at Sotheby's in 2013, shows workmen completing the landscaping. This painting was exhibited at the Royal Academy with its counterpart, a view from the house overlooking the lake and the newly landscaped parkland This painting shows Barret being influenced by Richard Wilson and moving towards a picturesque scene centred around a lake.

William Lock, a connoisseur and art critic, commissioned Thomas Sandby in 1774 to build a new house for him at Norbury Park near Mickleham in Surrey. Lock was in correspondence with William Gilpin and the house was sited to take full advantage of the picturesque qualities of the area. Inside, the house in the Painted Room Barret was assisted by Giovanni Battista Cipriani, Pastorini and Gilpin, with Cipriani doing the figures, Gilpin the cattle and Pastorini the sky. Eight painted pilasters appear to support a leafy arbour of trellis work, open to the sky: and on the walls of the room are views of distant countryside. Three are painted as a pastiche of scenes in Cumberland. One is natural, the view to the south towards Box Hill. At sunset, the light from the setting sun coincides on the western wall with the direction of light from a painted sunset so all the landscapes appear to be illumined by the same source. Barret also supplied an oil painting of the tree-lined drive at Norbury Park to William Lock. This is now in Norwich Castle Museum.

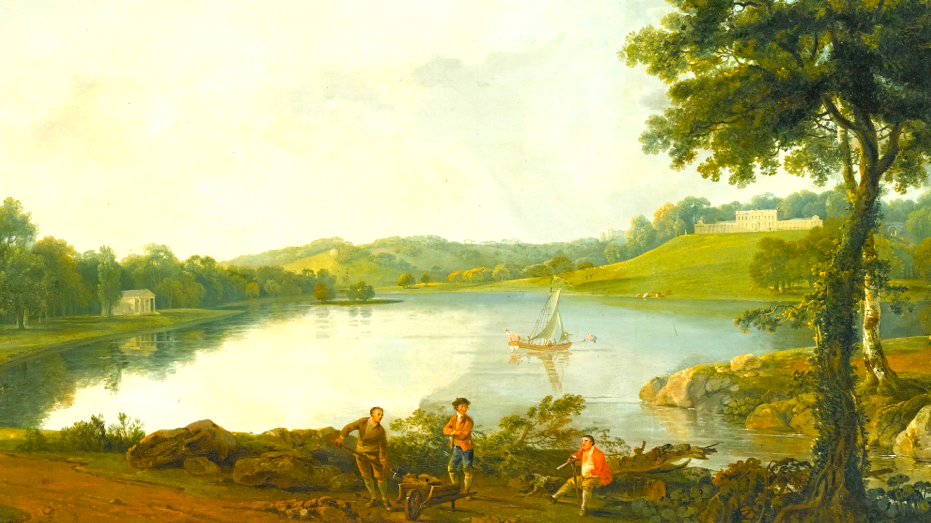
Gatton Park, c. 1770

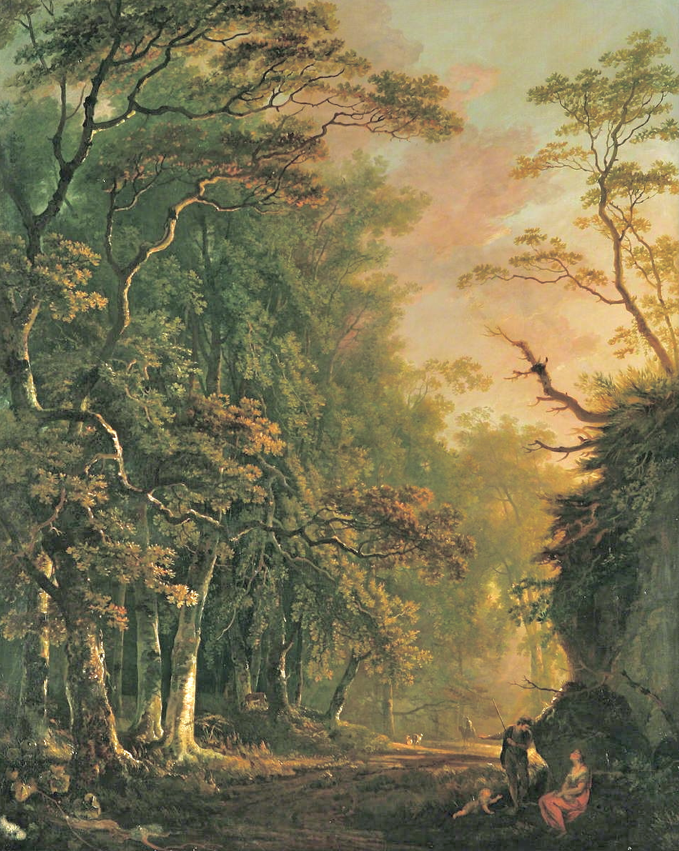
The Drive, Norbury Park, 1775

=== Philip Medows and Views of Richmond and the Thames ===
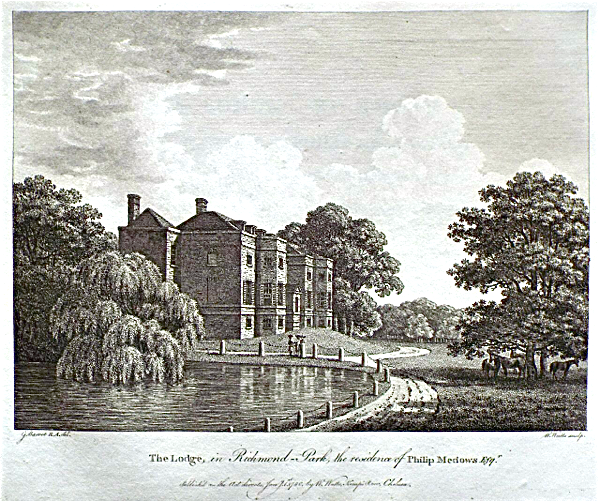
The Lodge in Richmond Park, engraved by William Watts

Another patron of Barret was Philip Medows, who was married to Lady Frances Pierrepont, sister of Evelyn Pierrepont, Duke of Kingston. Medows was the deputy ranger of Richmond Park, a position he held under Sir Robert Walpole, who had been the Ranger of the Park. A print engraved of 1779 by William Watts shows the Richmond Lodge, the residence of William Medows, which suggests that Barret had painted a picture of the building, which is now greatly altered and is known as Thatched House Lodge. Barret also painted numerous views of the River Thames in the area of the Terrace on Richmond Hill, some of which might have been commissioned by Medows. Sir Joshua Reynolds had a house built for himself close to the Terrace.

==== William Constable of Burton Constable Hall ====
Documents in the Burton Constable archives record the payment in August 1776 of £63 to Mr Barret the landscape Painter for a Journey from London making drawings and in March 1777 of £63 on account of three Landscape Paintings, Views of Burton Constable. These are still at Burton Constable, one showing the house with parkland in front. There is also a portrait of William Constable by Barret in the house.

==== Work in Hampshire and the Isle of Wight ====
In the mid-1770s Barret was undertaking work for patrons in Hampshire and the Isle of Wight. An example of this is a painting in the National Gallery of Scotland of the Thistlethwaite family with their house, Southwick Park, set in parkland behind them. This painting is very similar to the painting of Burton Constable Hall, and in both instances, the animals and figures are by Barret rather than by Sawrey Gilpin

==== Charles Townley ====
It is probable that Charles Townley, the noted antiquary and connoisseur, was also a patron of Barret. Townley returned from the Grand Tour in the mid-1770s, and it is likely to be after this that he commissioned the painting of his country house Towneley Hall. This a typical late Barret, similar to the Southwick Park and Burton Constable paintings, with the house placed towards the centre and framed with trees to the side. This painting is now in the Towneley Hall Museum and Art Gallery.

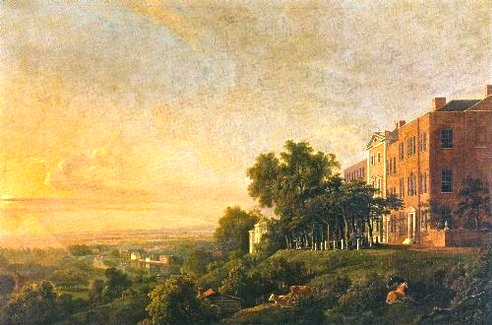
The Terrace, Richmond Hill, overlooking the River Thames, c. 1775

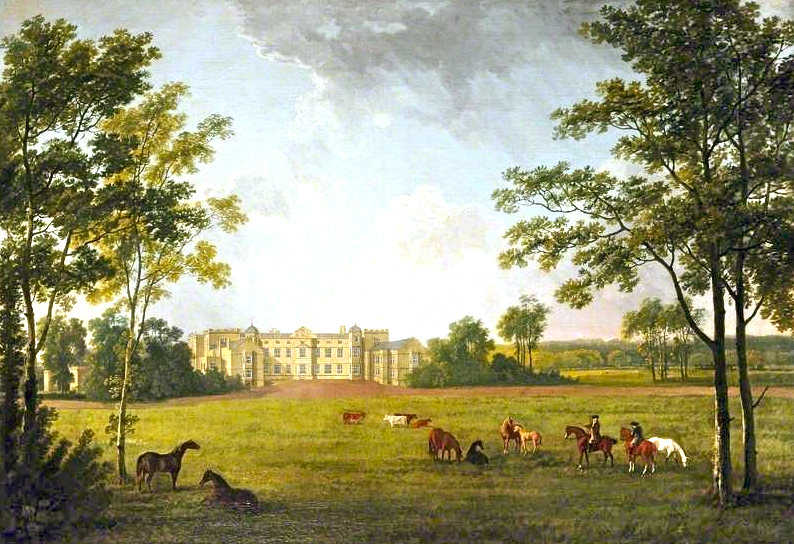
Burton Constable Hall and Parkland, 1777

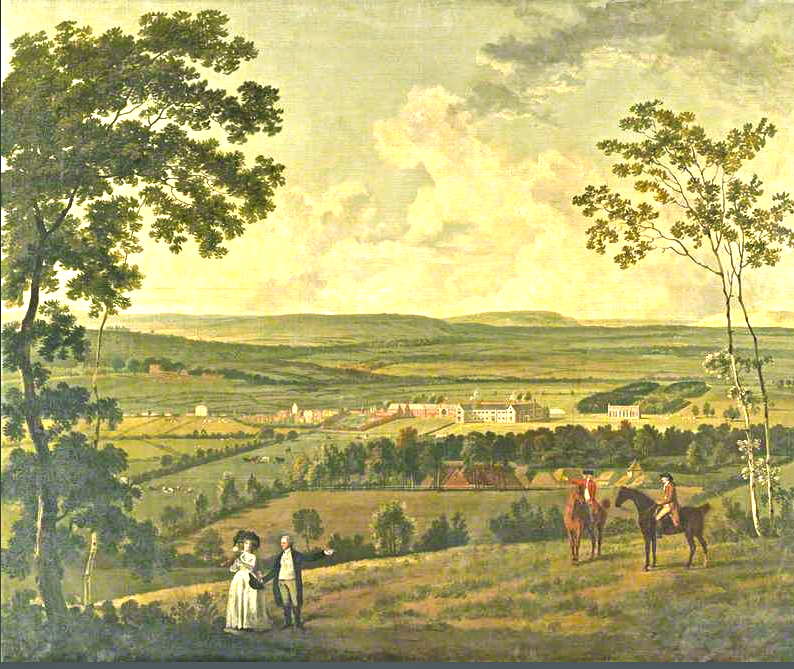
Southwick Park with Robert Thistlethwaite and his wife, with his two sons on horseback

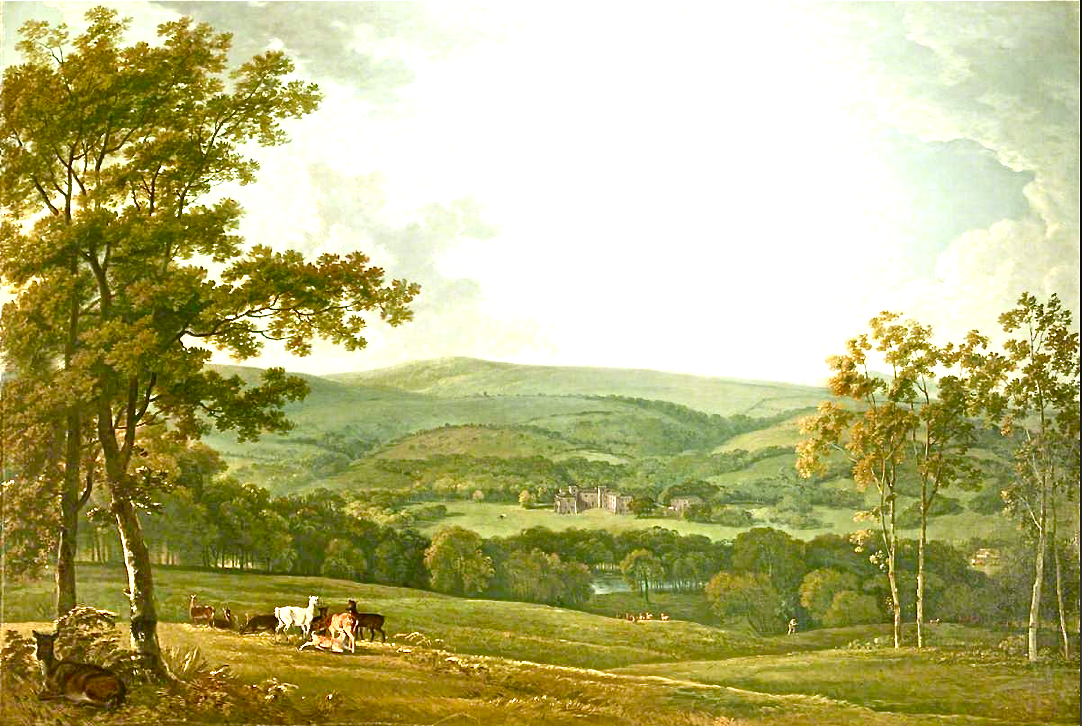
Towneley Hall, Lancashire

=== Later views of the Lake District ===
In 1781 Barret exhibited a painting at the Royal Academy of a View of Windermere Lake in Westmoreland, the effect, the sun beginning to appear in the morning, with the mists breaking and dispersing. This may be the same painting as the painting which is signed in brown paint G. Barret / 1781 that is now in the National Gallery of Victoria, Australia Barret appears to visited the Lake District in 1781, and not only produced other versions of this painting, which shows Belle Island, but also other views of Windermere and Ullswater, both as paintings and gouache. The Belle Isle view was also published as an engraving.

During the 1770s the scenery of Lake District became a popular attraction for tourists, aesthetes and painters and particularly after Thomas West's Guide to the Lakes of 1778, which commended the noble scenes of Poussin exhibited on Windermere-Water. Lake Windermere, with Belle Isle, its largest island, was one of the principal attractions. Barret would appear to be selling these views to tourists who had visited the Lakes. The island in Lake Windermere, formerly Longholme, was bought by Thomas English in 1772. The architect John Plaw built a three-story rotunda house (just discernable in the painting) with a massive classical portico. In 1781 he sold the site to Isabella Curwen, whose husband, John Christian Curwen, renamed the island Belle Isle.

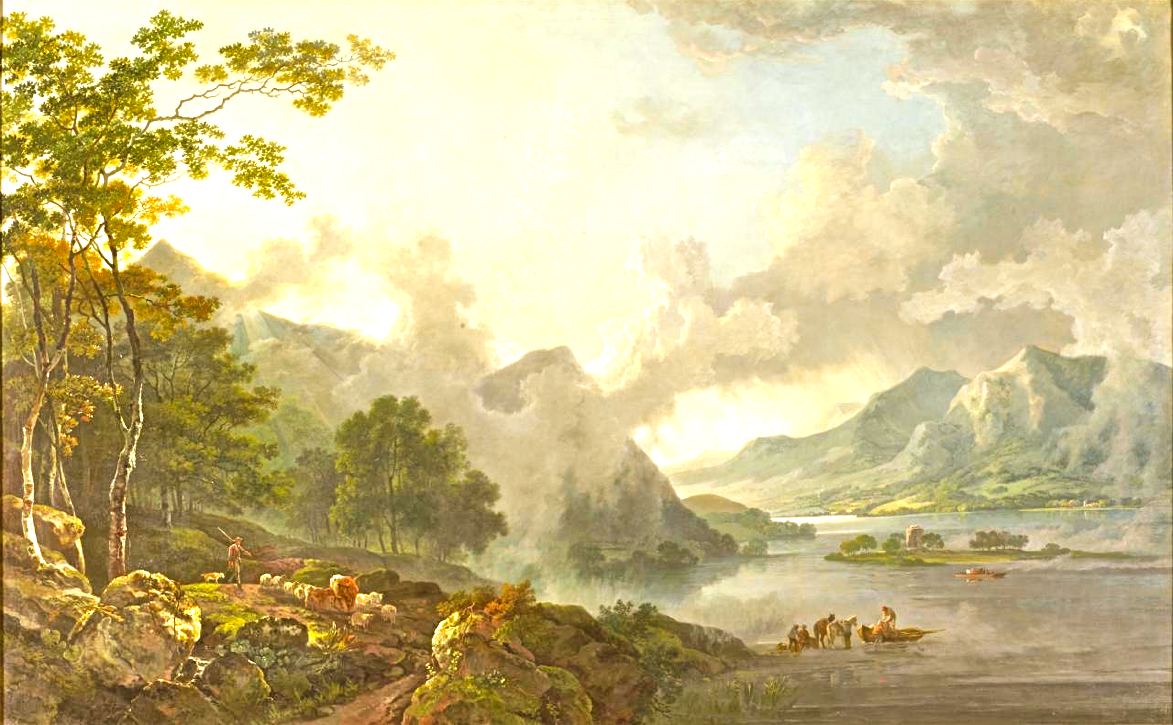
Belle Island, Windermere

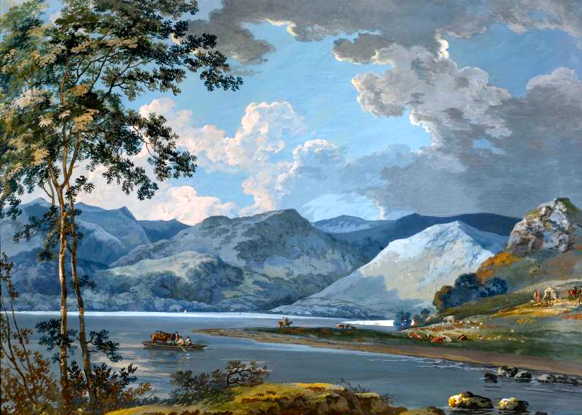
Goauche of Lake Ullswater, 1781

=== Wales ===
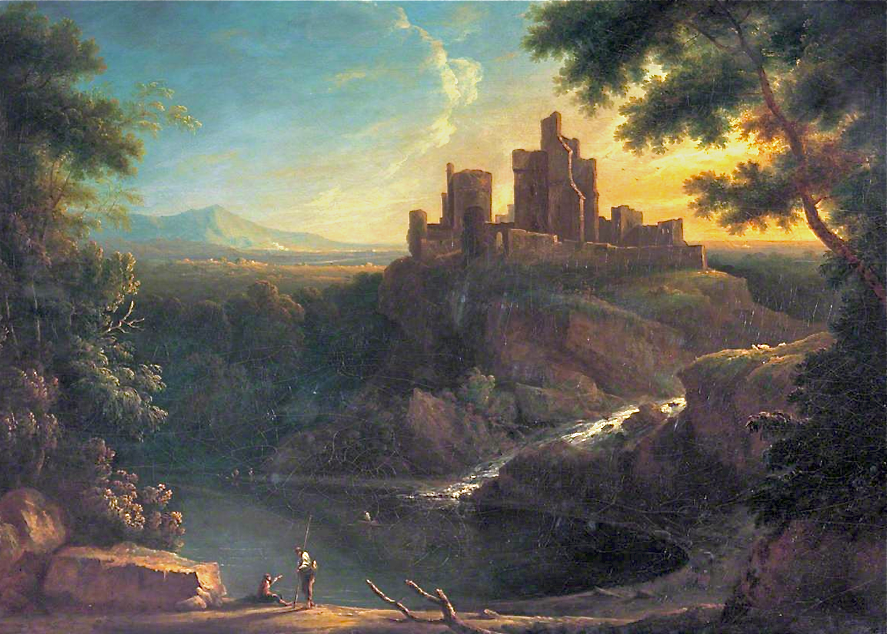
Cilgerran Castle

George Barret produced a notable series of paintings of scenery in Wales, some of which have considerable similarity to views by Richard Wilson. A few of these paintings may have been completed shortly after his arrival in England. An oil-painting of Hawarden Castle in Flintshire was exhibited by Barret at the Society of Artists in Great Britain in 1765. However, it seems likely that most of Barret's Welsh paintings were produced towards the end of his life. In the mid-1770s Wales was becoming an increasingly popular destination for wealthy tourists.

In the summer of 1777 Henry Penruddocke Wyndham made his second tour through Wales accompanied by the Swiss artist Samuel Hieronymus Grimm, who is very likely to have known Barret. Wyndham's Tour through Monmouthshire and Wales published in 1781, started with at the Severn and worked round the Welsh coast to Snowdonia before returning along the Welsh borders. This was a route followed by many tourists and Wyndham's book was the first published guidebook with illustrations of the scenery. Surviving oil-paintings by Barret suggest that he must have made a similar tour, starting in the south and many of his oil paintings are taken from similar viewpoints to those used by Grimm. The Government Art Collection has oil-paintings by Barret of both the Severn and Wye confluence and Cilgerran Castle on the borders of Cardiganshire and Pembrokeshire. There are a number of paintings which may portray scenery in Merionethshire and in Snowdonia Barret produced a number of paintings of Snowdon from Llyn Nantle and Llyn Padarn. Unlike Richard Wilson he did not paint Caernarfon Castle, but he did produce at least five different versions of a painting of Conway Castle.

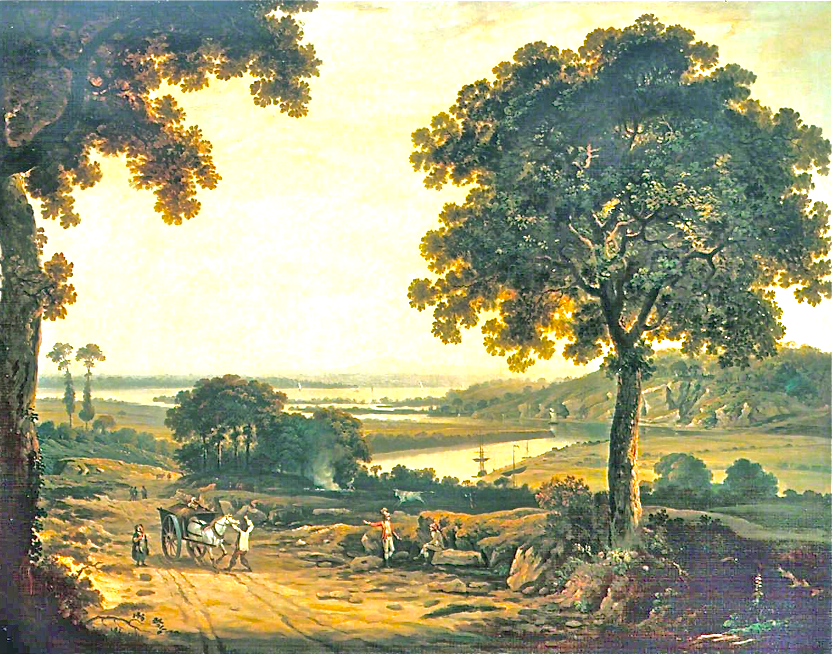
The Confluence of the Severn and the Wye

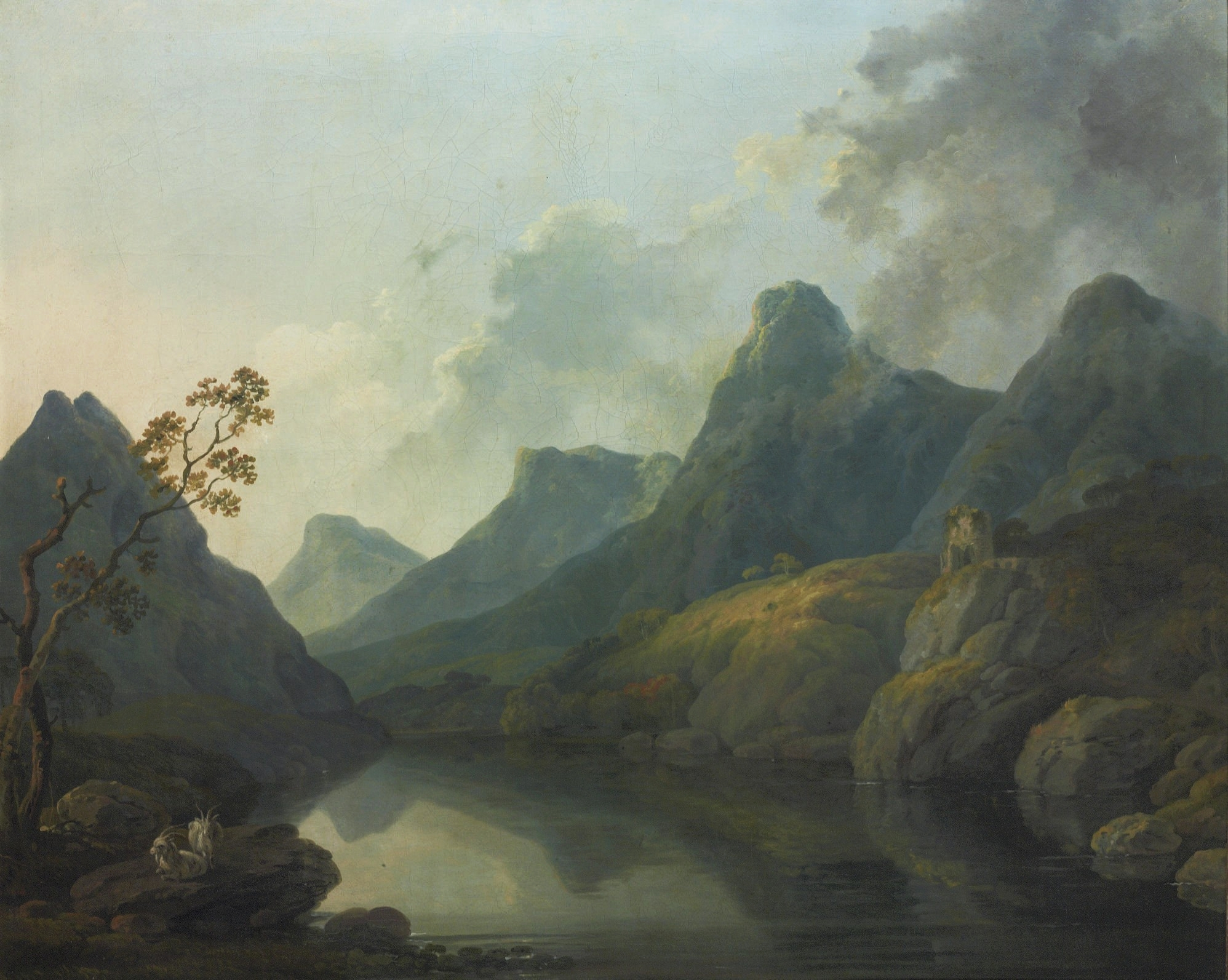
A view of Llanberis, with Dolbarden Castle, Caernarvonshire, North Wales

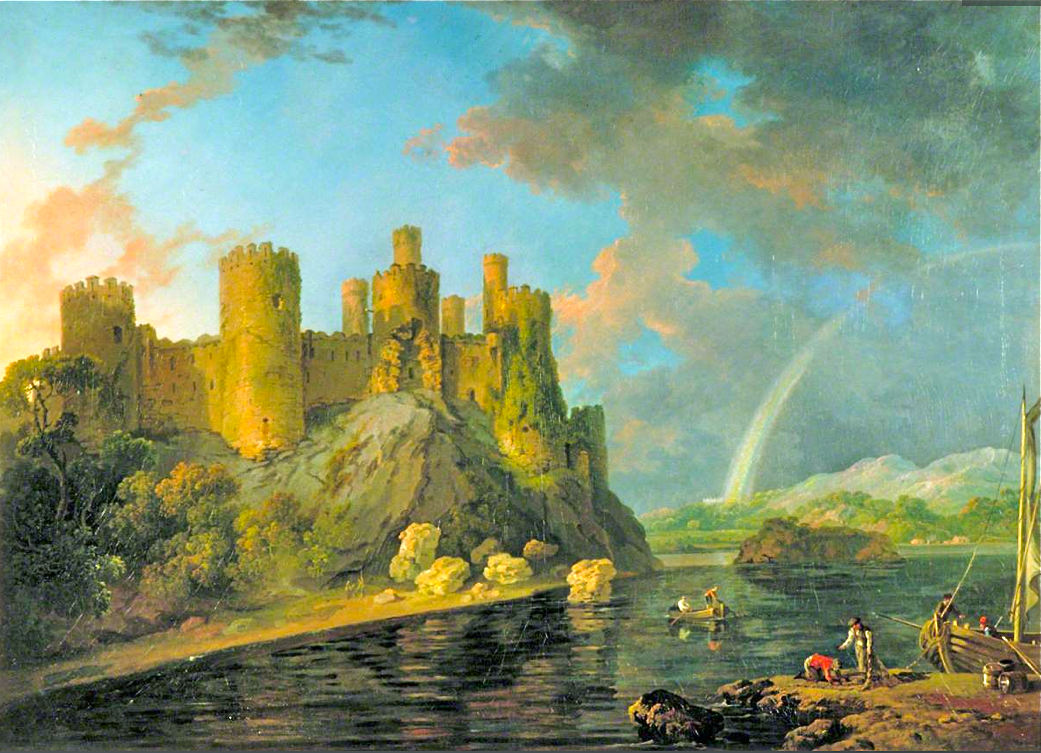
Conway Castle with rainbow after a storm, c. 1778

== Later life ==
Around 1770 Barret is known to have been living in Orchard street an extension of Baker Street in London, and he has been linked to the young Anglo- Irish aristocrat and aspiring politician, the Hon. Edward Augustus Stratford. Stratford of Baltinglass, County Wicklow (who became Earl of Aldborough) who was developing the land belonging to the City of London Corporation, called the Lord Mayor's Banqueting House Ground. Stratford laid out Stratford Place, a planned cul-de-sac of superior Georgian houses, culminating in a single grand mansion at the end, which is unique in London. Early on Stratford Place was grouped with Portland Place and the Adelphi Terrace in a trio of London's finest showpiece developments. According to a story published in 1783, Stratford had learned of the site from Barret, then resident in Orchard Street, whom he had consulted 'about purchasing or building a town house'.

In later life Barret became increasingly impoverished. He appears to have been forced to sell the contents of his studio in 1771, shortly before moving out to Westbourne Green. It appears that larger landscape oils were going out of fashion and Barret may have concentrated more on producing watercolours and gouaches for sale. Barret had married Frances Percy in 1757 while still living in Dublin. Four of their children (George, James, Joseph and Mary) also became painters. George (1767–1842) achieved particular notability, as an early member of the Society of Painters in Water Colours, where he exhibited prolifically. James Barret succeeded his father as the master painter of Chelsea Hospital and exhibited oils and watercolours at the Royal Academy between 1785 and 1819. George Barrett Senior died in Westbourne Green in 1784.

=== Work with other artists ===
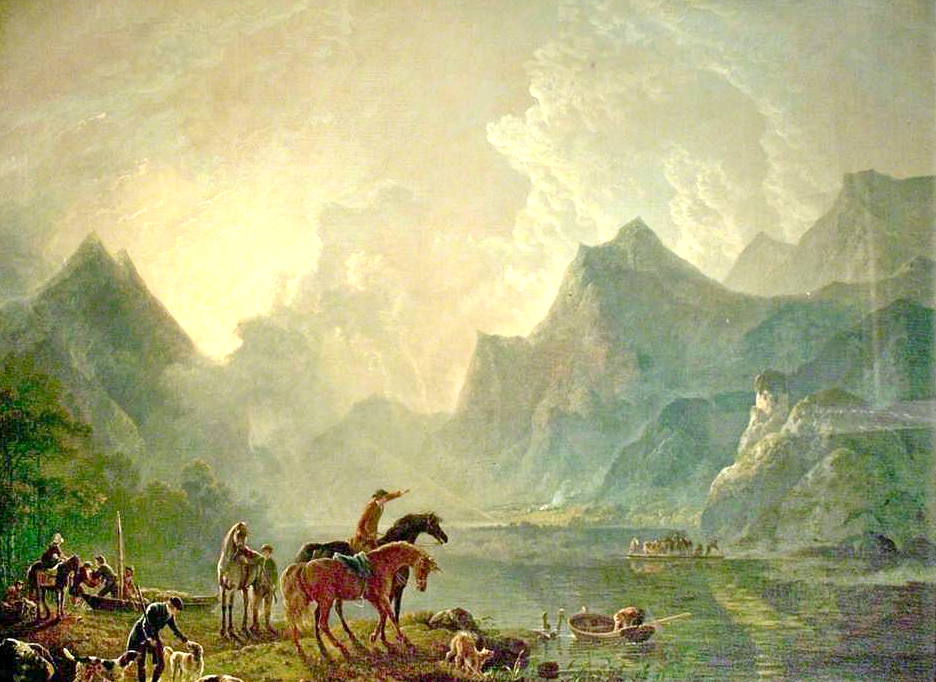
Llyn Padarn and Dolbarden Castle

Barret often worked with other artists, particularly when depicting animals. The Lowther painting of Knipe Scar included dogs that were painted by George Stubbs and the sportsmen by Philip Reinagle and a painting sold in 1802 had figures attributed to Francis Wheatley.

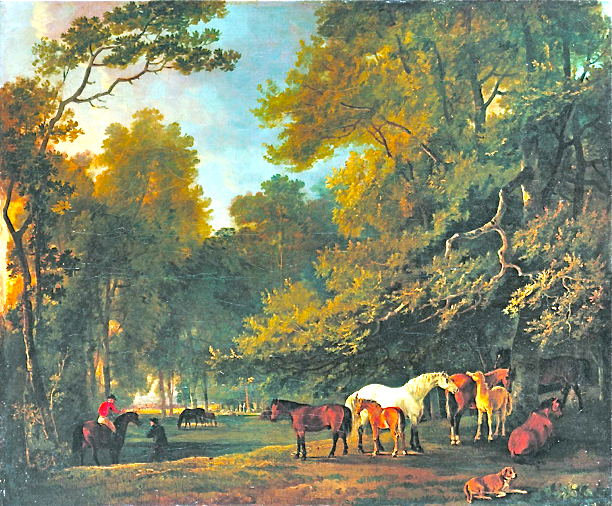
Brood Mares and Foals by Gilpin and Landscape

In the 1770s he was increasingly working with Sawrey Gilpin, a leading animal painter. A good example of their joint work is the view of Llyn Padarn and Dolbadarn Castle in Nottingham Castle Museum which shows a party about to board the ferry crossing the lake to Llanberis. The figures and animals are by Gilpin. Barret's co-operation with other artists including Gilpin at Norbury Park has already been noticed and it seems likely that he also provided the landscape backdrop for some of the artists with whom he worked. However Barret was competent in painting his own figures and animals and Bodkin remarks that such collaborations afford Barret's desire for friendly intercourse with his fellows, rather than to work on his own.

== Watercolours, gouache, etchings and prints ==
While Barret is better known for his oil paintings, he was also a notable watercolourist. Thomas Bodkin wrote His watercolours are rare, and far surpass those of his contempories [sic?]. They are painted with great fluency.....The bold blueness of their skies, though usually now much faded, excites much admiration, when the distaste of the eighteen century for primary colour in landscape is remembered. Like John Sell Cotman, he was fond of painting watercolour landscapes in monochrome. These were executed at times in Indian ink and at times in washes of pale blue.

=== Gouache ===
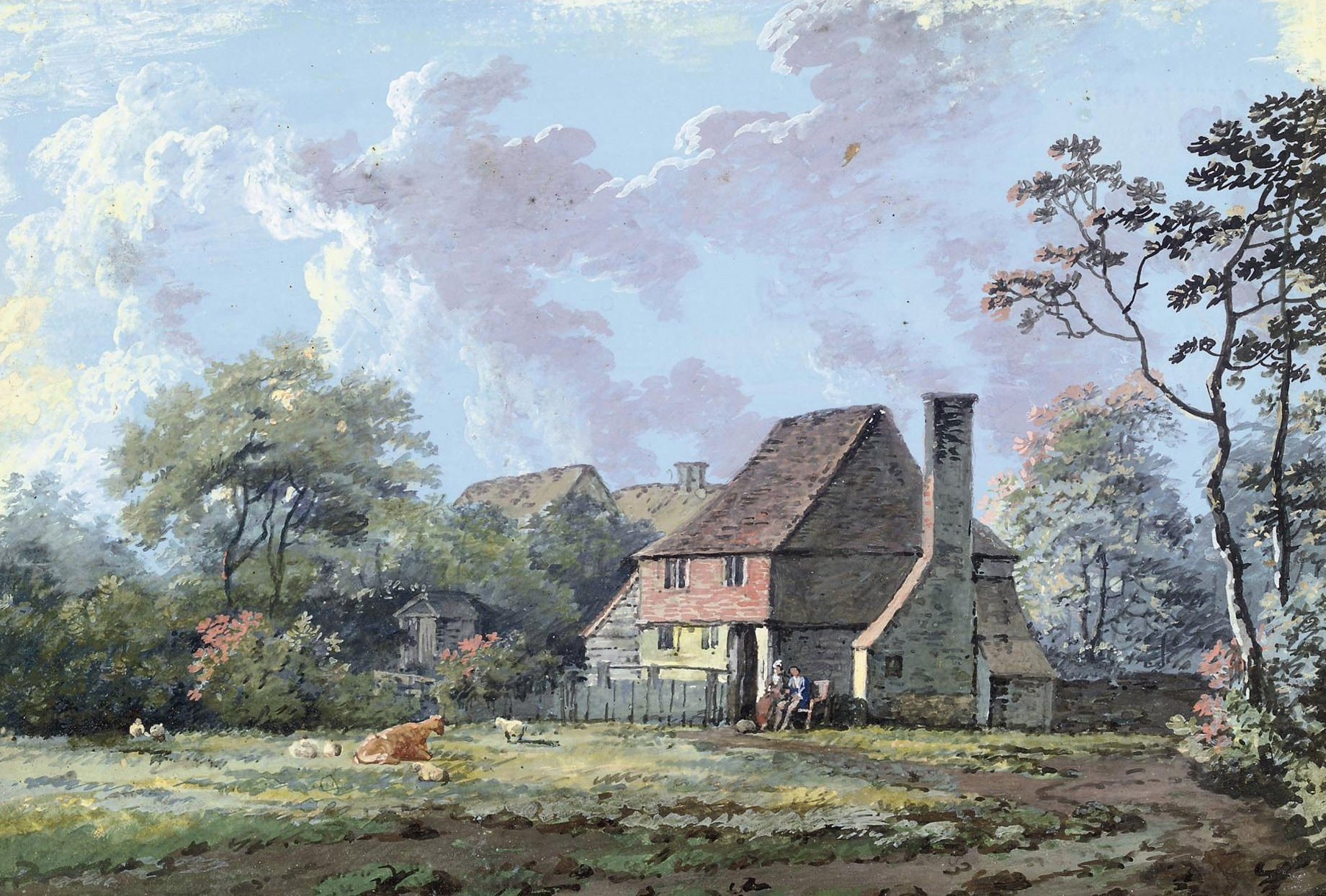
Gouache- Figures sitting outside a farmstead

Later in his career, Barret specialised in the Gouache technique which had been introduced into Britain by the Italian artist Marco Ricci between 1708 and 1726. A dated example of G Barret (22 February 1781) shows Lake Ullswater: a party of tourists gathering to enjoy the prospects at the head of the lake. This suggests that Barret had made a tour in the Lake District in the year previous to 1781when he exhibited at the Royal Academy a View of Windermere Lake, in Westmoreland, the effect, the sun beginning to appear in the morning, with the mists breaking and dispersing (no.40).

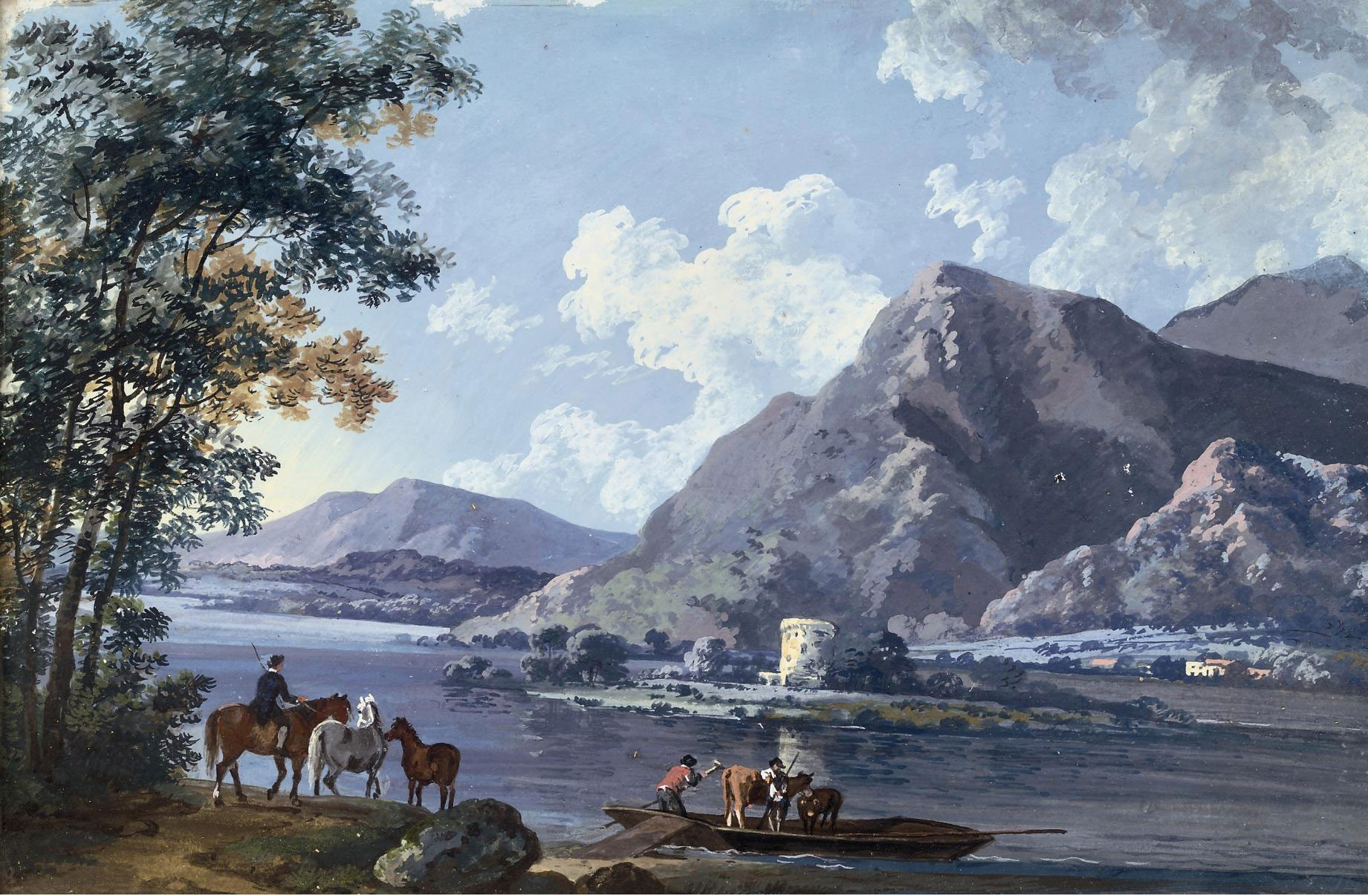
Gouache-Ferrying animals across Windermere

A gouache view of Ullswater in the National Gallery of Ireland, was used for an engraving by Samuel Middiman for Select Views in Great Britain. Middiman describes the view of the bold promontory of Hollin Fell, in the centre, taken from Soulby Fell, with: 'the vast chaos of mountains that guard the Head of the lake beyond. Barret has included an elegant group of figures enjoying a picnic on Soulby-Fell on the right of the composition; a ferry transports more tourists and their horses across the lake to the base of this hill.

=== Prints and etchings ===
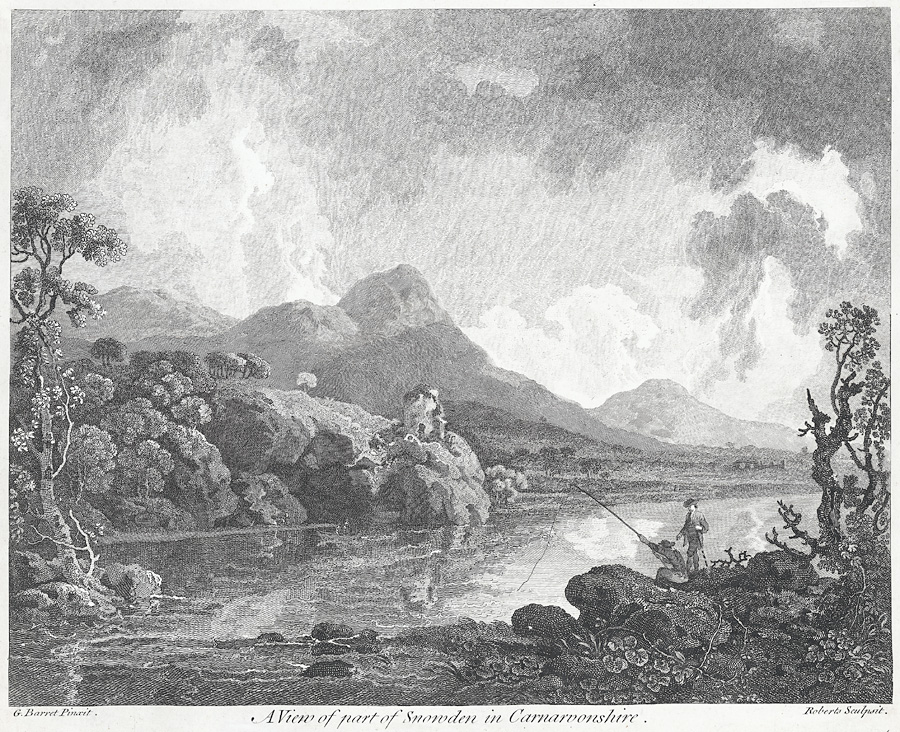
A view of part of Snowdon, Caernarfonshire

Prints of Barret's work were published by William Watts in his Views of the Seats of the English Nobility and Gentry in 1779–1789 and in Samuel Middiman's Select Views in Great Britain published in 1783–1789. Watts engraved six views by Barrett of Claremont House in Surrey, Burton Constable Hall, the Lodge at Richmond Park, Kedleston House in Derbyshire and Cadland Park in Hampshire. Middimans views were of Winnadermere [sic], Ulleswater [sic] and Shanklin Chine. The National Library of Wales also has a number of prints of paintings by Barret, engraved by Roberts, of scenery in Snowdonia.

== Modern assessment ==
In the 19th century Barret's work faded into obscurity and it became the practice to ascribe many landscape paintings, often by minor artists, to Barrett. In 1920 Thomas Bodkin, Director of the National Gallery of Ireland wrote an impassioned plea that greater prominence should be given to Barret's work. However, at that time, Barret was largely unrepresented in Museum and Art Gallery Collections in the British Isles. Since the Second World War a considerable number of Barrets have entered public collections and the Barrets at Burton Constable Hall are now available for public view.

In 2016 the Portland Gallery at Welbeck Abbey was opened, displaying the Duke of Portland's notable collection of Barrets. On the art market, the auction record for a work by George Barret, Sr. was set in 2005, when the painting, Wooded Landscape with Fishermen Hauling in Their Nets, was sold at Christie's, London, for £512,000. This has created a much wider appreciation of Barret's work, but as yet, unlike other major artists of the period, no detailed discussion and catalogue raisonné of his work has been published.

== Sources ==
- Bodkin T. (1920) Four Irish Landscape Painters: George Barret R.A., Irish Academic Press, 2nd ed. 1987. ISBN 0-7165-2405-8 Four Irish landscape painters, George Barret, R. A., James A. O'Connor, Walter F. Osborne, R. H. A., Nathaniel Hone, R. H. A.
- Constable W. G., (1953), Richard Wilson, English Master Painters, R&KP, London (Contains a biography of Barret pp. 144–5)
- Crookshank A. and The Knight of Glin (2002) Ireland's Painters, 1600–1940 (Paul Mellon Centre for Studies in British Art), Yale University Press. ISBN 9780300097658
- Goulding R.W. and Adams C.K.(1936). Catalogue of the Pictures belonging to the Duke of Portland. K.G.
- Harris J. (1979), The Artist and the Country House: A history of country house and garden painting 1540–1870. Sotheby Parke Burnet Publications. ISBN 0-8566-7053-7.
- Monkhouse W. C., Barret, George (1732?–1784), rev. Anne Crookshank, Oxford Dictionary of National Biography, Oxford University Press, 2004; online edn, May 2006 accessed 12 June 2007
- Wynne, Michael. Reflections on "Art and Oratory", Éire-Ireland, 5, 2 (Summer 1970), pp. 95–102.
- Ramm, John. 'Apostle of Light' (Principally about Barret Jnr.), 'Antique Dealer & Collectors Guide', October 2000, Volume54, No.3.
- Ellis Waterhouse (1981) The Dictionary of British 18th Century Painters in Oils and Crayons, Antique Collestors Club, Woodbridge, ISBN 0-9020-2893-6
