= George Mullins (painter) =

Irish landscape painter

- Born: circa 1740; Dublin, Ireland
- Died: 1775
- Occupation: painter

George Mullins (fl. 1763 – died 1775) was an Irish landscape painter.

== Life ==
An extensive wooded river landscape with a mounted herdsman and cattle in the foreground.. Oil on canvas, 43.3 x 40.2 in. / 110 x 102 cm.

George Mullins born in Dublin, and was trained by James Mannin in the Dublin Society's Drawing School beginning in 1756. Nothing more is known of his early life. He was first employed by Thomas Wyse in Waterford where he painted trays and lids for snuff boxes.

He returned to Dublin, and began to exhibit from his home in Temple Bar. In 1765, he first exhibited with three oil landscapes with the Society of Artists, and continued to exhibit with the Society until 1769. He won a Dublin Society premium of 10 guineas in May 1767 for "the best original landscape in oils", and again in June 1786 for a history painting. He obtained, however, some success as a landscape-painter, and coming to London exhibited at the early exhibitions of the Royal Academy from 1770 to 1775. Whilst in London, he gave his address as that of Robert Carver.

His work shows the influences of Claude Lorrain and George Barrett. He also included nudes in his landscapes in the style of Cornelius van Poelenburgh.

He was hired by Lord Charlemont to paint decorative pictures for his Marino estate. Mullins was also employed as a sign painter and taught one of the premier future Irish landscape painters, Thomas Roberts, and is thought to have influenced him in style and subject matter. Mullins may have painted the ceilings at Chirk Castle, Wales.

== Family ==
He married a young woman who kept an alehouse near Temple Bar, called the Horseshoe and Magpye, which was popular with those in the theatre. Mullins died in England in 1775, and around the age of 35.
