= Hugh Douglas Hamilton =

Irish painter (1739–1808)

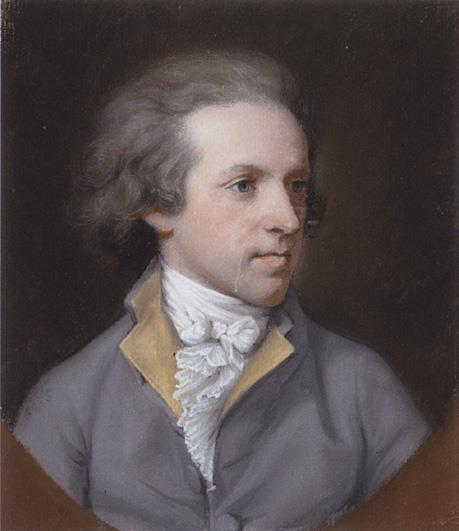
- Self-portrait, c. 1785–1790
- Born: c. 1739; Dublin, Ireland
- Died: 10 February 1808 (aged 67–68); Dublin, Ireland

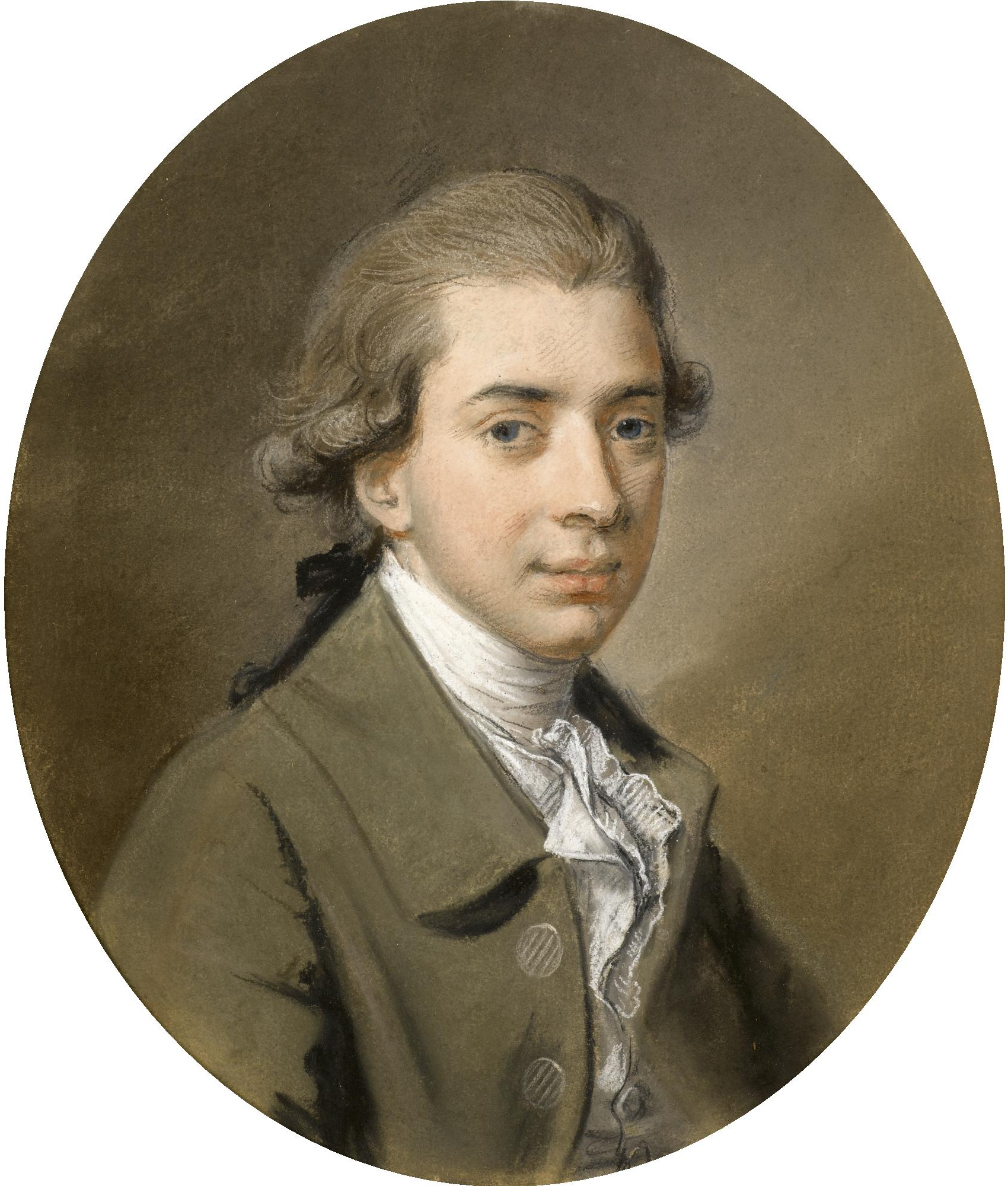
Portrait of a Young Gentleman, by Hugh Hamilton.

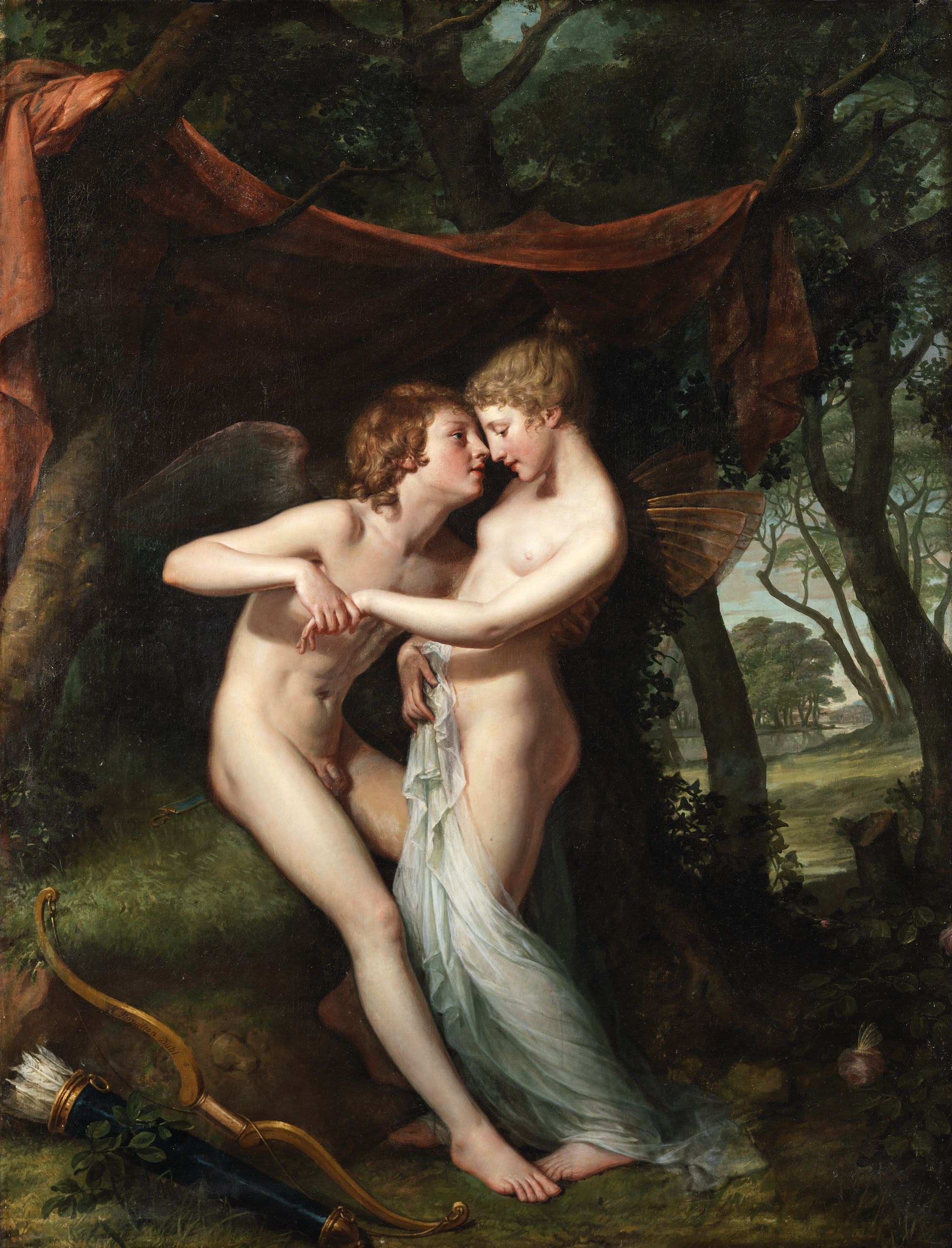
Cupid and Psyche in the nuptial bower by Hugh Douglas Hamilton. Oil, 1792–93.

Hugh Douglas Hamilton RHA (c. 1739 – 10 February 1808) was an Irish painter who specialised in portrait painting. He spent considerable periods in London and Rome before returning to Dublin in the early 1790s. Until the mid-1770s, he worked mostly in pastel. His style influenced the English painter Lewis Vaslet (1742–1808).

== Life ==
Hamilton was born in Crow Street, in Dublin, Ireland, in 1739, the son of a peruke maker. Unfortunately, there is very little concrete evidence of his early life, apart from his own drawings. He studied art under Robert West and James Mannin at the Dublin Society House - and won some early success with crayon and pastel portraits there. He was very adept at building relationships with patrons from the early days, taking up with the famous La Touche banking family of Dublin, who had close ties with the Bank of Ireland.

Very little is known of Hamilton's career between 1756 and 1764, when he moved to London. An album of drawings dated 1760 by Hamilton of Dublin street hawkers was rediscovered in Australia in 2002. Hamilton found great success in London through his pastel oval portraits, portraying royalty, politicians and celebrities of the day through this medium. Hamilton was often overwhelmed with orders, including commissions from the British royal family - such as Queen Charlotte (1764) and others now in the British Royal Collection. He showed with the Society of Artists and the Free Society of Artists from the mid-1760s to the mid-1770s. From the mid-1770s on, Hamilton became very interested in a softer, more textural form of pastel "fresco", in which he blended crayons and chalk to further the pastel's ability to imitate flesh.

In 1779 he travelled to Italy, where he remained for the next twelve years, occasionally visiting Florence but mainly based in Rome, where he knew Antonio Canova. His with his wife Mary and his daughter Harriott moved with him. On the advice of artist John Flaxman Hamilton turned to oil painting, and achieved great success with small oval portraits of Irish and British visitors. His portraits of this period include those of Dean Kirwan (displayed at the Royal Dublin Society), George John, 2nd Earl Spencer, Countess Cowper (1787), and the exiled Charles Edward Stuart (Lord Edward, 1785). His portrait of Susan Frances Elizabeth (Anne) Butler (née Wandesford), Countess of Ormonde may be seen at Kilkenny Castle.

In 1791 Hamilton returned to Dublin, where he died at his home on Lower Mount Street on 10 February 1808. In 1796 he painted Lord Edward Fitzgerald, the Irish revolutionary. One of his last portraits (c. 1804), of William Downes, 1st Baron Downes, Lord Chief Justice of Ireland, is considered to be one of his best.

In the last four years of his life, he developed a keen interest in science, and spent less time painting. After his death, his daughter Harriott (or Hariot, born 20 September 1767) finished some his outstanding portraits.

== Style and technique ==
Hamilton was best known for his pastel oval portraits depicting the head and shoulders of the sitter. These pastels were lively and affordable, costing around six guineas apiece. They became very popular throughout Europe. For these oval portraits, Hamilton used handmade cream or off-white paper, usually medium in thickness, that was finished with gelatin glue. While it is unclear how Hamilton prepared his paper for the pastels, it is thought that he did not use preparatory drawings and that the portraits were usually completed in one sitting from life. This speed and skill was necessary to ensure a steady flow of clientele, as Hamilton was very pressed with commissions for these portraits.

While there is no surviving documentary evidence on Hamilton's pastel technique, through close examination of his works, researchers and conservators have been able to discern some of his techniques. Hamilton most likely applied each tone to the portrait separately before blending to avoid dulling the image, using the pastel sticks both wet and dry. When drawing a face, he first outlined the head and shoulders in a light tone, then added the features of the face in "faint carmine tones". He then blended the tones on the face using his fingers. After this, the background was filled in using the broad side of the pastel, avoiding the outline of the face. The final strokes of the pastel were then used to fill in loose hair and other details, and graphite was then used to draw in small details such as eyelashes. Hamilton's technique remained more or less constant throughout his career, influenced by the European tradition and the desire of the market.
