= Ordnance Survey buildings =

Building in Southampton

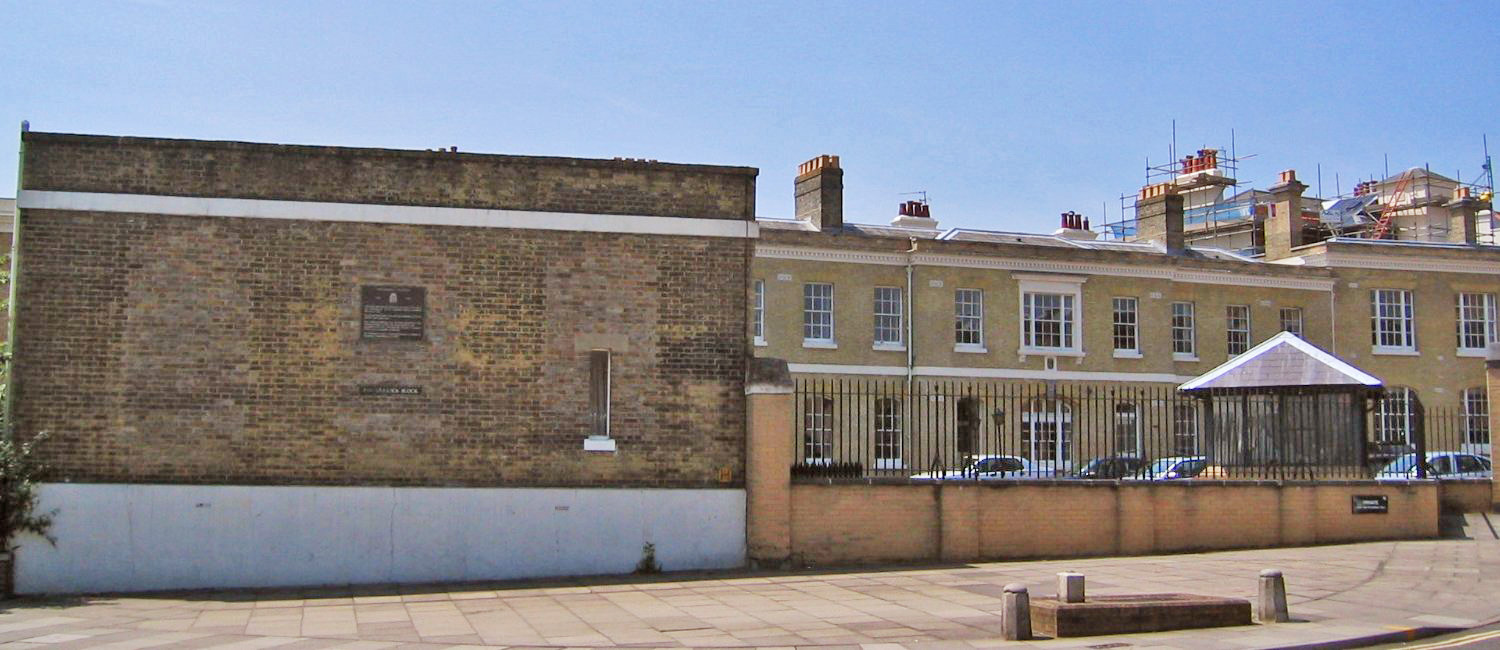
- The former Ordnance Survey buildings in 2005

- Location within Southampton
- Former names: Royal Military Asylum

General information
- Type: Yellow brick
- Location: Southampton, England, London Road
- Coordinates: 50.9131°N 1.4032°W
- Construction started: 1866–1872
- Owner: HM Courts Service

Design and construction
- Architect: Major General Sir Henry James

The former offices of Ordnance Survey are situated in London Road, Southampton, close to the junction with The Avenue, and are now part of the city's court complex and are occupied by government agencies. The buildings are Grade II listed.

== History ==
Ordnance Survey originally came to Southampton on 12 November 1841, a fortnight after a fire had destroyed its headquarters in the Tower of London. It took over vacant buildings that had been built between 1794 and 1806 as barracks for the Duke of York's Royal Military School, before being used between 1816 and 1840 as a branch of the Chelsea-based Royal Military Asylum. Some of the early barracks buildings had been designed by local architect, John Plaw, who also designed houses in nearby Brunswick Place.

The asylum, which gave its name to Asylum Green, the open space in the middle of The Avenue, provided schooling for up to 400 military orphans and children of serving soldiers of both sexes until 1823, when the boys were transferred to Chelsea, with Southampton taking more girls. A decline in the school numbers resulted in its closure in 1840.

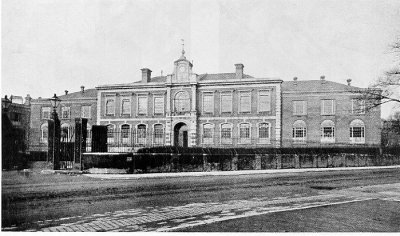
The main building (now demolished) in 1930

Although originally reluctant to move to Southampton, Ordnance Survey soon settled in the town and over the next sixty years, several new buildings were erected, with most of the original asylum and barracks buildings being demolished. The main building, erected in the 1850s, featured a clock tower that became a prominent landmark in the town.

In 1940, the buildings were seriously damaged in the Blitz as a result of which Ordnance Survey moved much of its activities to temporary buildings at sites in Chessington in Surrey and by Crabwood House in Maybush, on the outskirts of Southampton. By May 1969, the vast majority of staff had moved to the new, 'permanent', purpose-built headquarters complex in Maybush; when Ordnance Survey vacated the London Road site.

Most of the late-Victorian buildings have now been cleared away, along with 20th-century buildings such as the printing building. Most of the remaining buildings are occupied by various government agencies in conjunction with the modern court complex built on the northern part of the site, including the Crown Prosecution Service, and previously by the Official Receiver (who is now based in Commercial Road).

== Description of buildings ==
The oldest remaining building is one of the engraving rooms built shortly after Ordnance Survey moved arrived in 1841. The remaining buildings date from between 1866 and 1872, and comprise the barrack block, the staff quarters and the Western Range, all of which were designed by Major General Sir Henry James (1803–1877), who was then Director-General of Ordnance Survey. The buildings were designed by James to harmonise with Avenue House on the north-eastern corner of the site, where James lived from 1865 until his death.

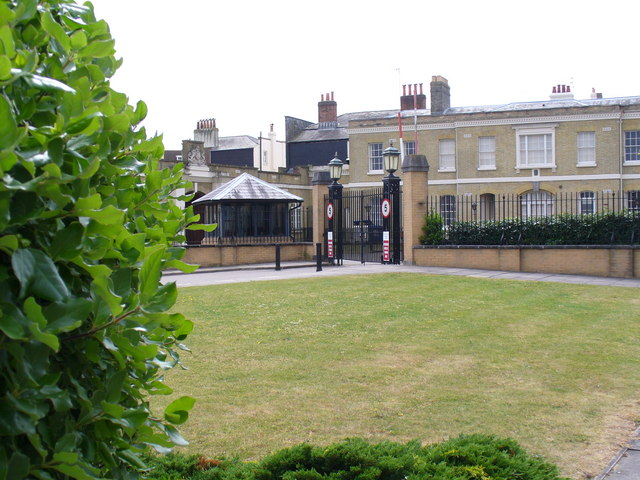
The entrance gates with the Western Range buildings behind and the Barrack Block to the left.

The remaining buildings on the site are all Grade II listed, and are built of yellow brick. The largest building, the "Western Range" is a long two-storey block with the date 1867 in a keystone. It comprises two main sections at a slight angle to each other to accommodate the curve of Carlton Crescent, onto which it backs, and the slope of the site. The southern section has a projecting central bay with two wings, all of which have three windows at each floor, some of which are blank; the projecting bay has triple central windows. This building has a parapet with a dentil cornice concealing the roof and a moulded band between the floors. The northern section is slightly higher and has two-halves, one set back, each of which has three sash windows, with one entrance door.

At right angles to this building is what is now known as the "Barrack Block" which is a single storey block with a flat roof. In the centre there is a round-headed carriage entrance with keystones surmounted by the Royal Crest. The windows on the London Road elevation have all been bricked in.

At the southern end of the site is the former "Staff Quarters", a two-storey building in four sections, having seven windows in all at each level, some of which are blank. The date 1868 is engraved on one of the keystones. This building has a modillion cornice and a moulded band between the floors.

Adjoining the modern court complex is a square building with a hipped roof and three windows at each floor; those on the ground floor have stuccoed fan mouldings echoing those on Avenue House. This building is all that remains of the original main building which was severely damaged in the blitz and later demolished.

The entrance gates and gate piers are also Grade II listed. The listing describes them as "Early 19th century gates by W. and J. Lankester. Two brick square gate piers with stone caps. Cast iron gate eight feet high with two cast iron pillars."

== Avenue House ==
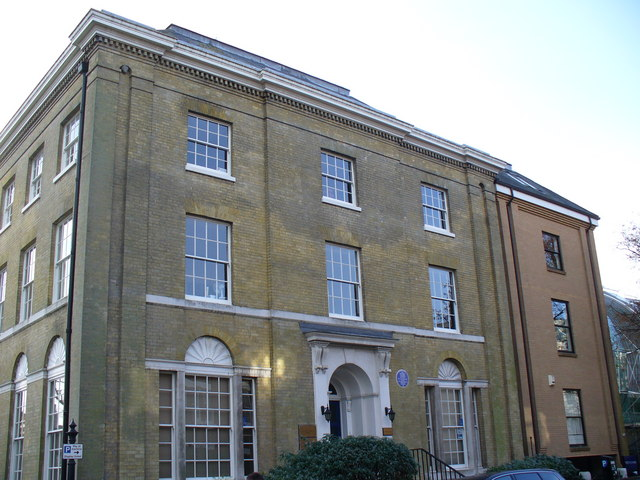
The Director General's House in 2007

Now known as the "Director General's House", this substantial house on the corner of The Avenue and Rockstone Place, was one of the last buildings designed by Samuel Toomer. The property was first let to Thomas Leader Harman, a local Liberal politician and proprietor of the Hampshire Independent weekly newspaper. During Harman's occupancy, the house was assessed at 41 windows and four male servants lived in. After Harman left in 1843, other tenants followed until the property was acquired by the Ordnance Survey in 1865, and renamed "Ordnance House", to accommodate the Director-General.

The property is three-storeys, built of yellow brick and has full height pilasters at each corner with a dentilled cornice. There are four sash windows at each floor on The Avenue elevation and three on the Rockstone Place elevation. The ground floor windows are round-headed with arched recessed heads, and shell tympana decoration. The main door is at the centre of the Rockstone Place elevation; the stone doorcase has a shallow moulded cornice hood on brackets and pilasters over a round-headed keyed door opening. The property is now occupied as offices by a firm of solicitors. By the door is a blue plaque in memory of Major General Sir Henry James, Director-General of the Ordnance Survey who live here until his death in 1877. This building is now a Grade II listed building.
