= John Plaw =

- Born: 1745; London, England
- Died: 1820 (aged 74–75); Colony of Prince Edward Island
- Occupation: Architect
- Awards: RSA

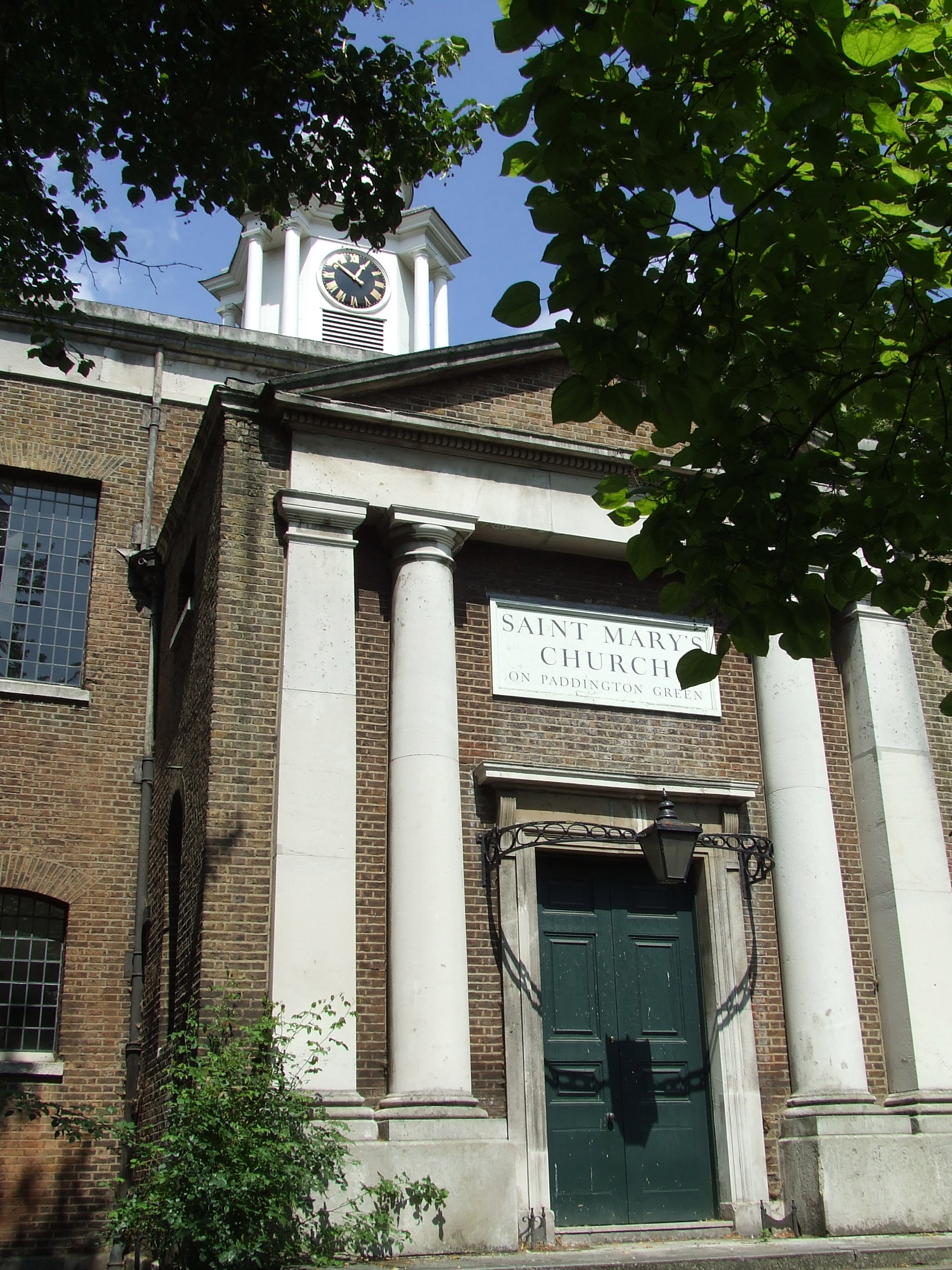
St Mary on Paddington Green is a surviving example of Plaw's work

John Plaw (1745–1820) was an architect who was born in London but later emigrated to the Colony of Prince Edward Island in North America. He is known for favouring circular designs in the classical style.

There are two known surviving examples of his work in the UK. These are a circular villa built on Belle Isle, Windermere’s largest island, and St Mary on Paddington Green Church, which was designed in the shape of a Greek Cross and constructed between 1788 and 1791. A third property, The Round House in Romford, Essex, constructed between 1792-4, has also been attributed to Plaw.

== Career ==
John Plaw began his apprenticeship with a London bricklaying company in 1759. As an apprentice, he received an architectural award from the RSA. From 1775 – a year after completing plans for the villa on Belle Isle – he was exhibiting architectural drawings at the Royal Academy of Arts.

In the 1790s Plaw found work in Southampton and the Isle of Wight designing the military barracks which became the offices of the Ordnance Survey as well as nearby housing. In 1807 he and his family emigrated to Prince Edward Island where he submitted proposals for a jail, a courthouse, a market building and a commercial building. The courthouse and market building were completed, however neither still stands today.

== Surviving designs in print ==
John Plaw is largely remembered for three successful pattern books, ‘Rural Architecture; or Designs from the Simple Cottage to the Decorated Villa ’, ‘Ferme Ormee or Rural Improvements’ and ‘Sketches for Country Houses, Villas, and Rural Dwellings’. All three books are still in print today.
