= James Mannin =

18th-century artist in Ireland

- Died: June 1779; Dublin, Ireland
- Style: Rococo

James Mannin (died June 1779) was an artist, painter and draughtsman who lived in Ireland.

== Life ==
There are no known details of James Mannin's early life. Some early sources state that he may have been French, but the surname Mannin is most commonly found in northern Italy. The first records of Mannin in Dublin date from 1753, when he is recorded as a designer of ornamental patterns. It was this work that brought him to the attention of the Dublin Society, which began an association which lasted the rest of his career. He supplied the Society with designs for items including carpets and picture frames during the 1750s, and in 1767 he designed the president's chair carved by Richard Cranfield (1731–1809). On 18 October 1769 he married Mary Maguire in St Andrew's Church, Dublin. He lived in Lazer's Hill from 1770 to 1775, before moving to King Street.

== Career ==
From 1753, Mannin worked as a private drawing teacher. In May 1754, Mannin took on a number of young Irish artists as apprentices with the Society, to teach them ornamental drawing and design. This first group included Hugh Douglas Hamilton. This was the first time in Ireland that design was formally taught and reflected the Society's mission to promote high quality design in Ireland. This was further cemented when Mannin became a salaried employee of the Society in May 1756 as the master of the school of ornament, a post he would hold until just before his death. During his tenure, he taught many Irish artists such as John James Barralet, George Mullins, and Thomas Roberts.

There are no surviving drawings attributed to Mannin, but given his influence it is believed he looked to French taste and in particular Rococo. The Society was interested in the development of art education in France, and purchased prints after works of French artists to be used as teaching aids. The Society had a strong role in shaping Mannin's teaching, to ensure that the teaching was of a standard commensurate with the Society's fees. He was instructed to teach his students in pattern drawing based on Hamburg damasks in March 1765, which reflected the promotion of damask weaving in the Irish linen industry. Mannin also taught drawing for engraving.

Mannin continued to work as a painter of landscapes, still lifes, and flowers in a private capacity throughout this time. In 1765 and 1766 he exhibited with the Society of Artists in Hawkins Street. The Dublin Society awarded him premiums for landscape three times, in 1763, 1769, and 1770. He also produced his own ornamental designs, including a staircase for the Society of Artists in 1765, and carriage designs for coachbuilders in 1770. He also taught art privately, and even complained in an address in June 1766 that the Dublin Society's teaching demands encroached on his ability to pursue this work.

He became ill in early 1779, leading him to suggest Barralet to be appointed master of the school of ornamental drawing in his place. His death was announced by the Dublin Society on 24 June 1779.
