= William Watts (engraver) =

English line-engraver (1752–1851)

- Born: 1752
- Died: 7 December 1851 (aged 99); Surrey
- Known for: Engravings printmaker painter

William Watts (1752–1851) was an English line-engraver.

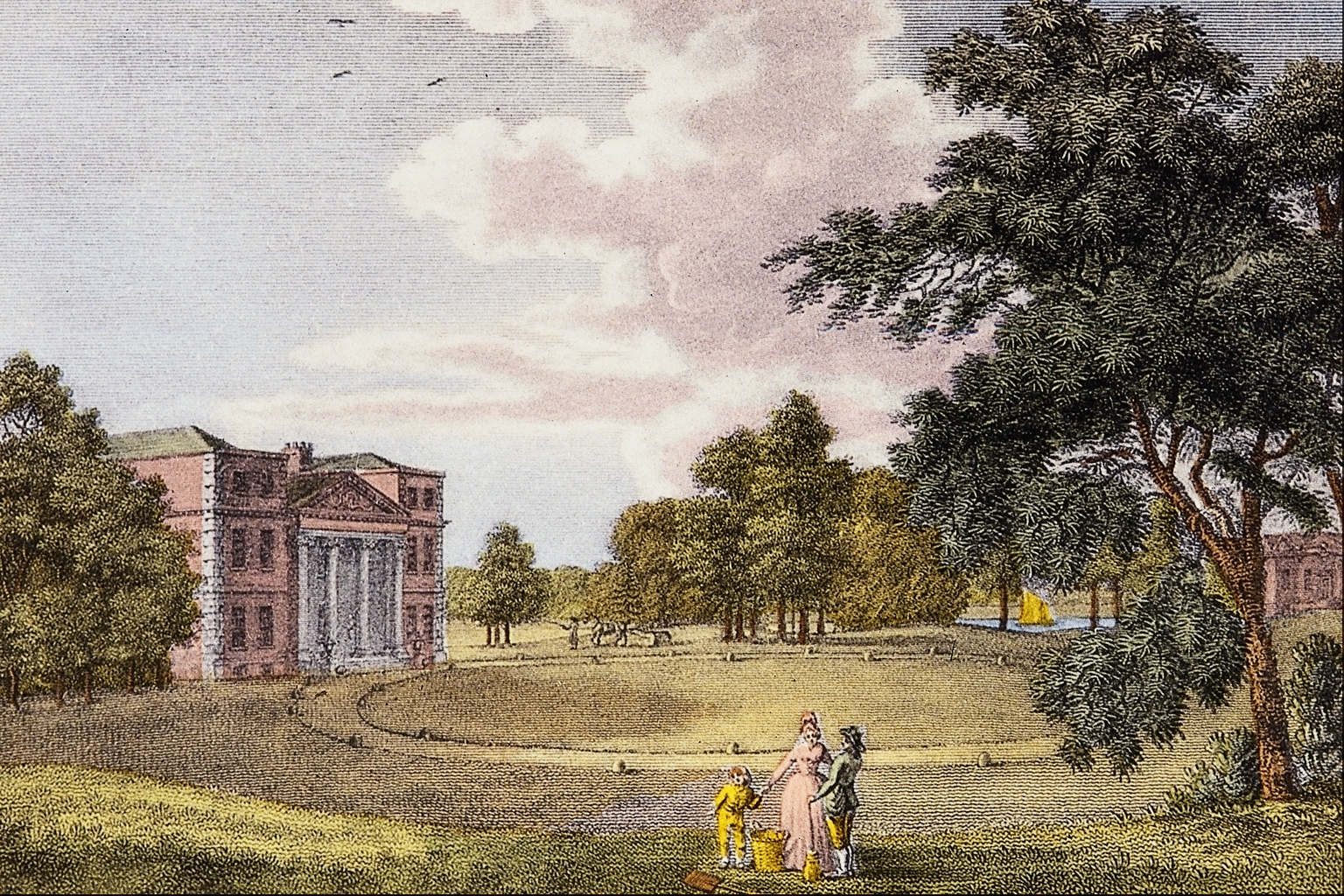
Grove House in Middlesex, the Seat of Mrs Luther (1796), by William Watts

== Life ==
The son of a master silk weaver in Moorfields, London, Watts was born early in 1752. He received his art training from Paul Sandby and Edward Rooker, and on Rooker's death in 1774 continued the Copper-plate Magazine.

Watts sold up at his house at Kemp's Row, Chelsea, London and went to Italy, reaching Naples in September 1786. After about a year he returned, and lived at Sunbury, Middlesex. In 1789 he went to Carmarthen, in 1790 to the Hotwells in Bristol, and in 1791 to Bath where he spent two years. Interested by the French Revolution, and went to Paris in 1793, where some of his views of English country seats were engraved in colours by Laurent Guyot. He invested most of the property that he had inherited from his father, with his own earnings, in the French funds; and all of it was confiscated (though he recovered some of it after the peace in 1815). His losses compelled him to return to engraving, retiring early in the 19th century.

Watts then lived for a short time at Mill Hill, Hendon. In 1814 he purchased a small property at Cobham, Surrey, where he died on 7 December 1851, after having been blind for some years, within a few months of his hundredth birthday. A Blue Plaque placed by Cobham Heritage marks the house.

== Works ==
Watts published a number of engravings of country seats after Sandby. His own Seats of the Nobility and Gentry, a series of 84 plates, followed in 1779–86. His views of the principal buildings in Bath and Bristol, prepared around 1790, were not published until 1819. Thirty-six Views in Scotland appeared in two parts (1791–4).

Watts also engraved three of the plates in Select Views in London and Westminster (1800), and sixty-five coloured plates, from drawings by Luigi Mayer, for Sir Robert Ainslie's Views in Turkey in Europe and Asia (1801).

=== Gallery ===
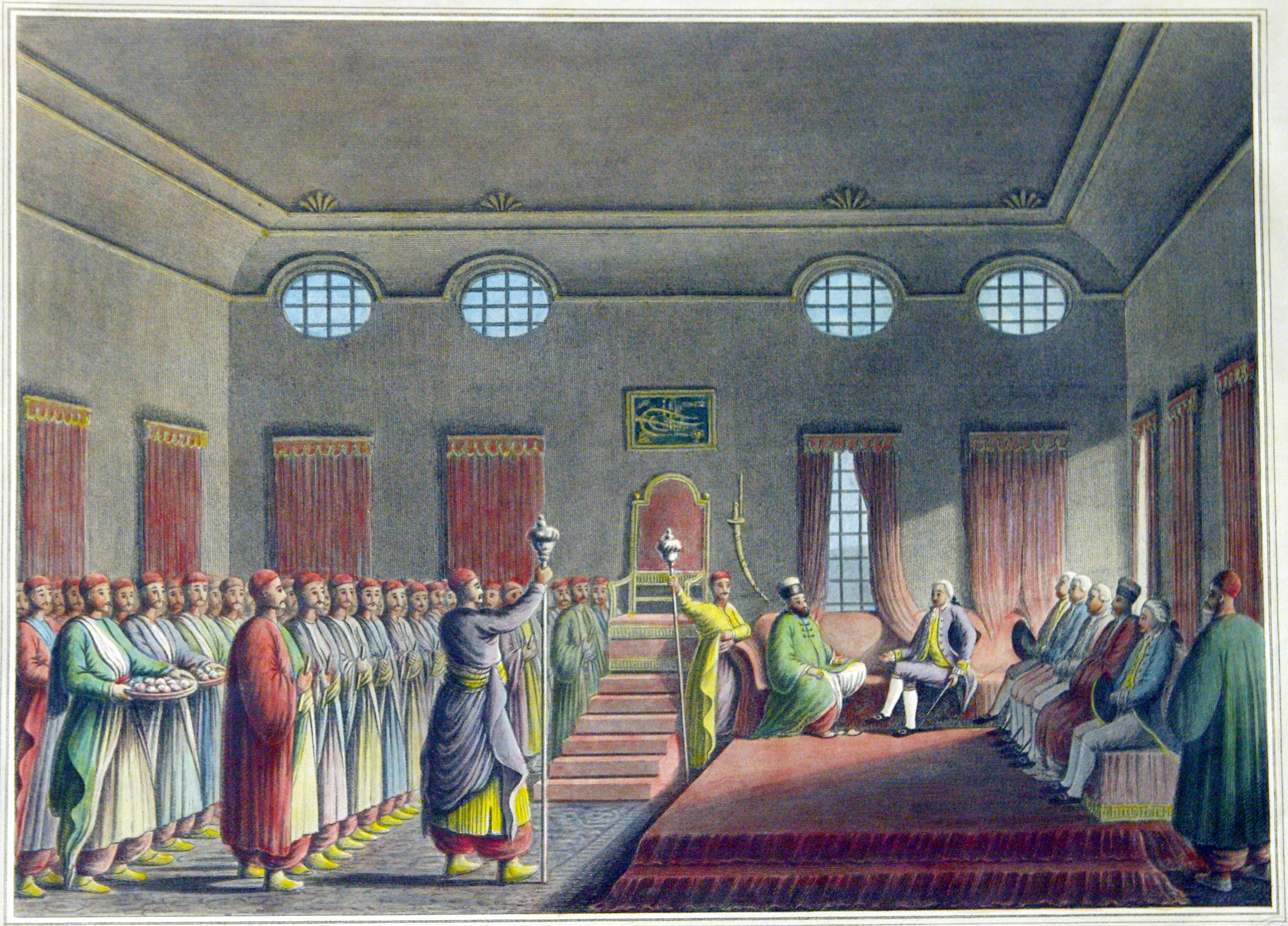

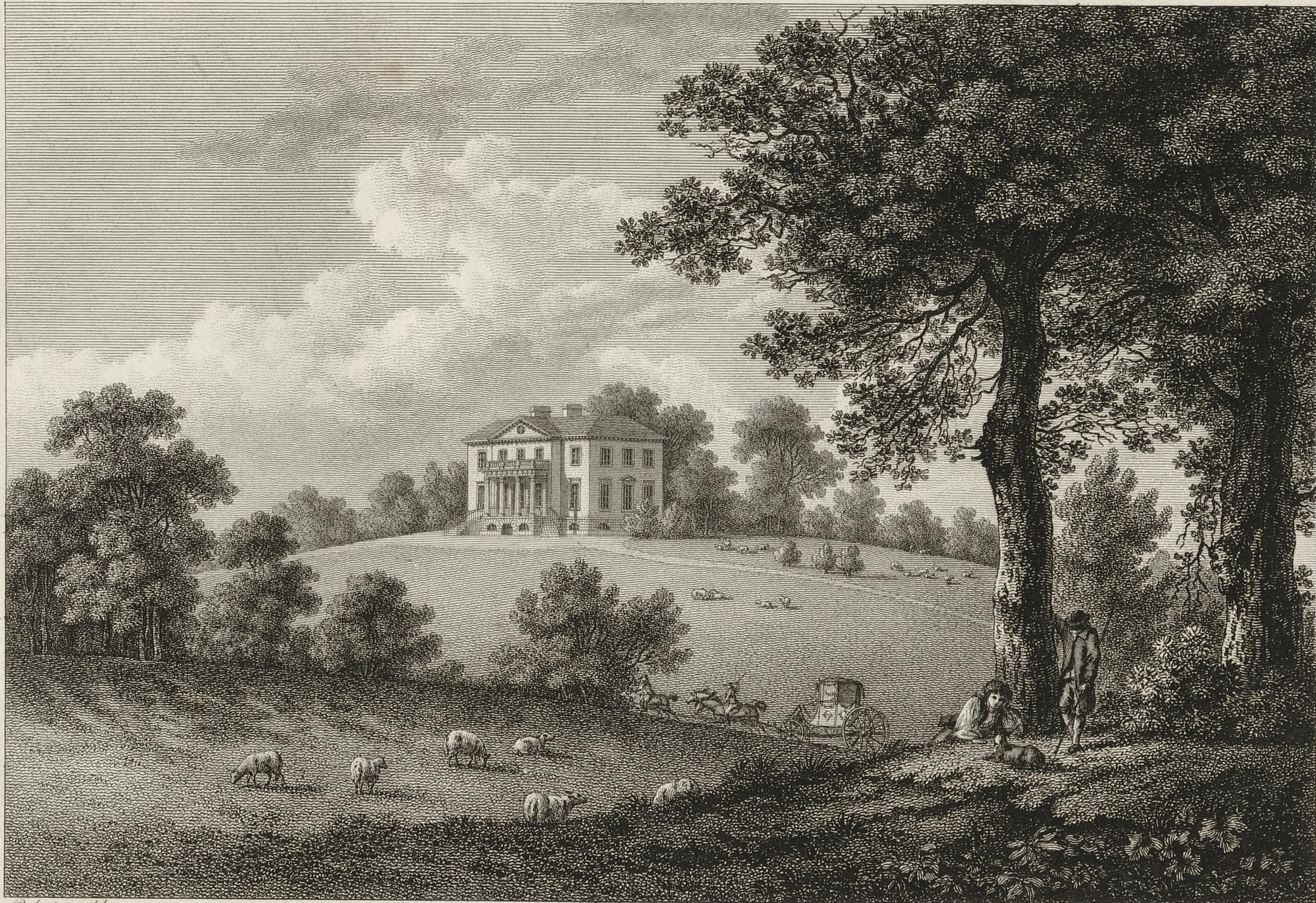

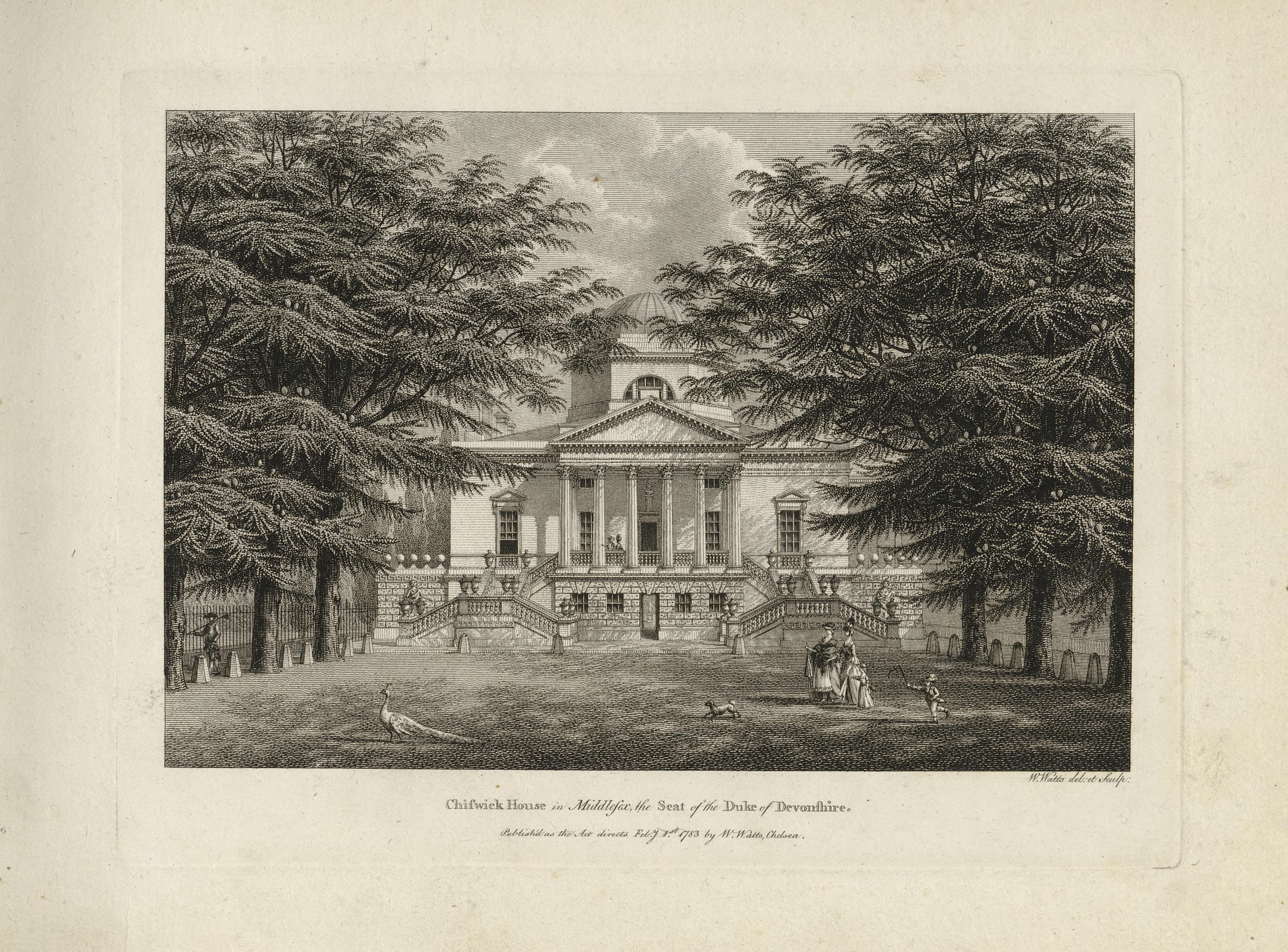

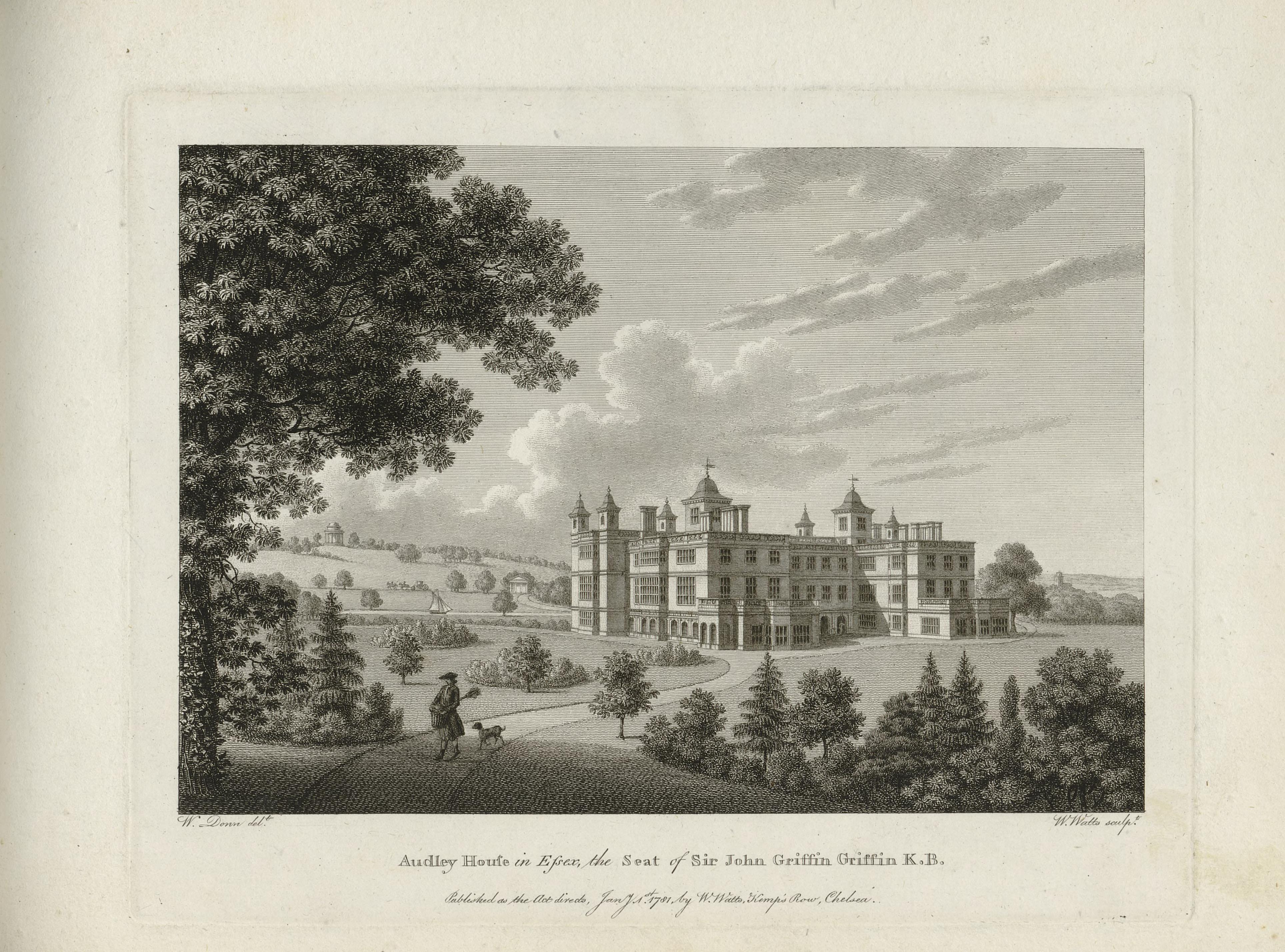

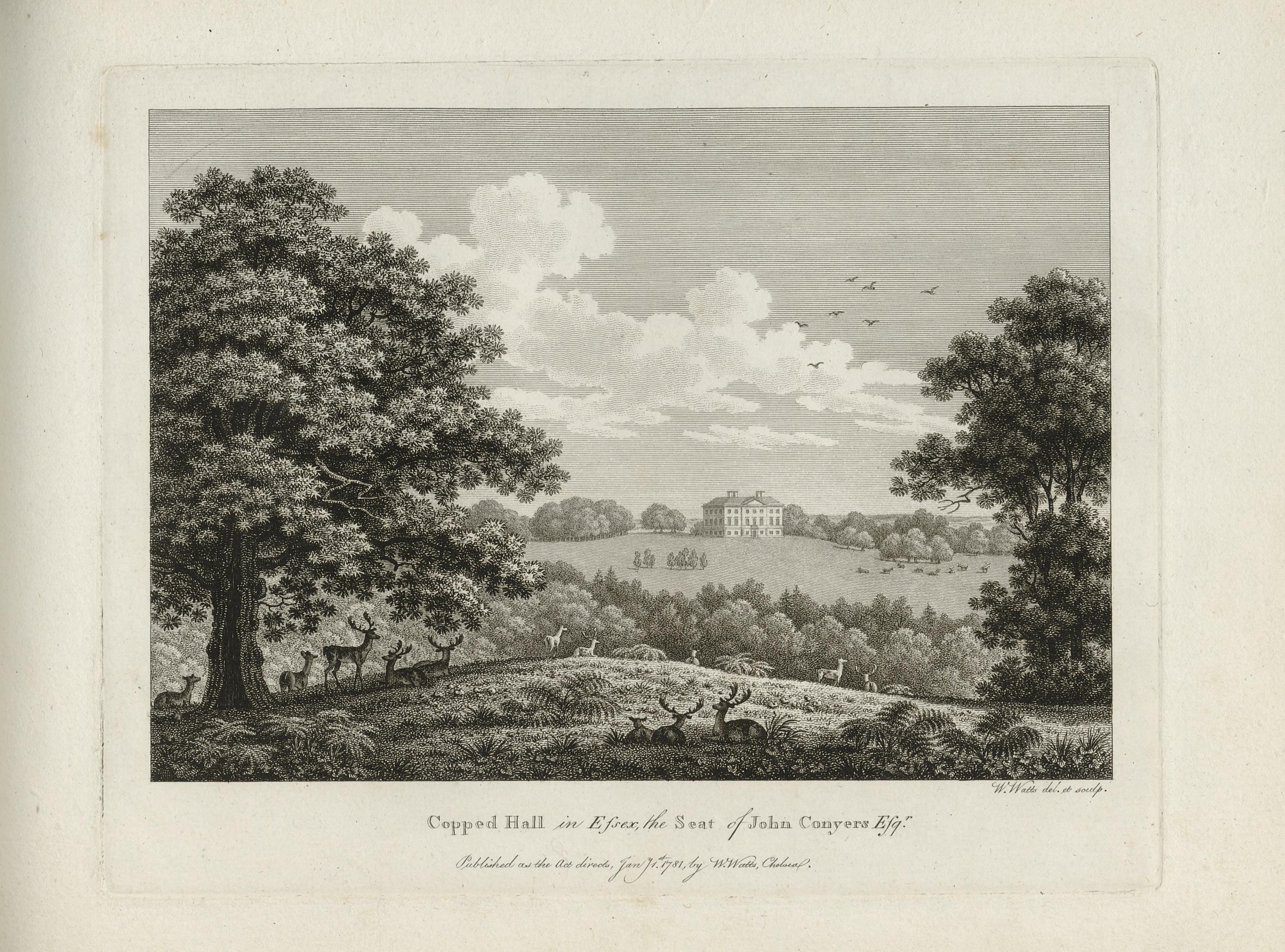
