= Belle Isle (Windermere) =

Island in a lake in Cumbria, England

Coordinates: 54°21′43″N 2°56′04″W

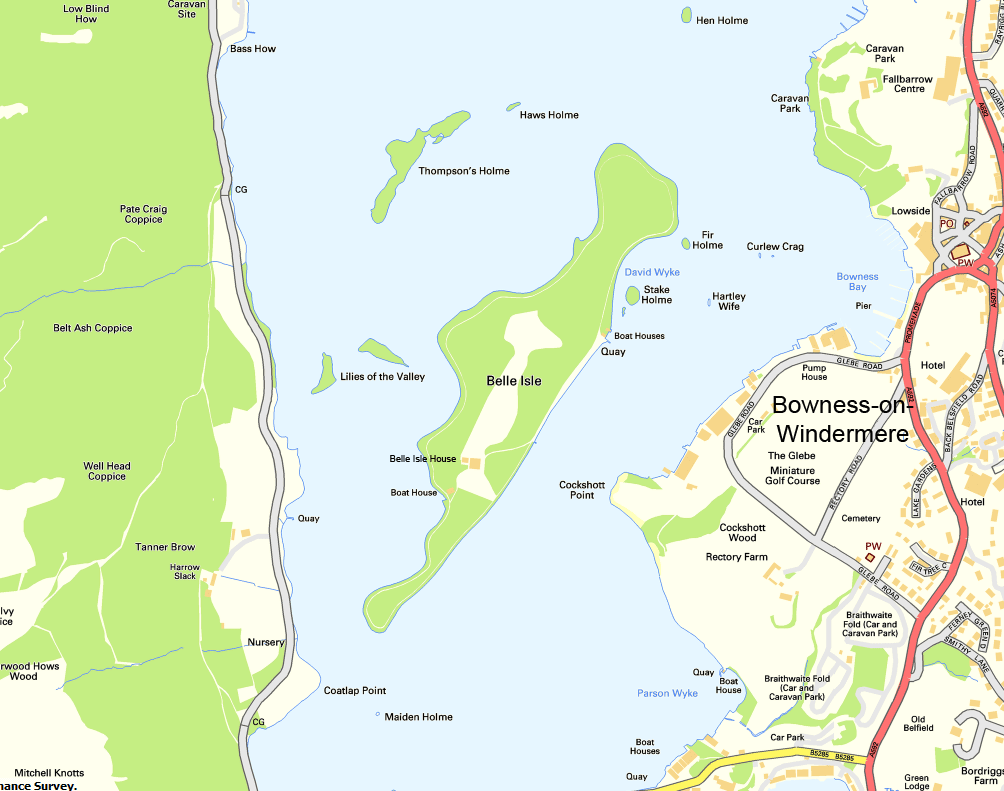
Map of Belle Isle, Windermere

Belle Isle is the largest of 18 islands on Windermere, a mere in the English Lake District, and the only one ever to have been inhabited. It is 1 km in length.

It is rumoured that in Roman times a villa was once built on the island, with a possible connection to the Roman fort at Ambleside. In 1250 it was the seat of the district's Lord of the manor. It was also a Royalist stronghold during the English Civil War.

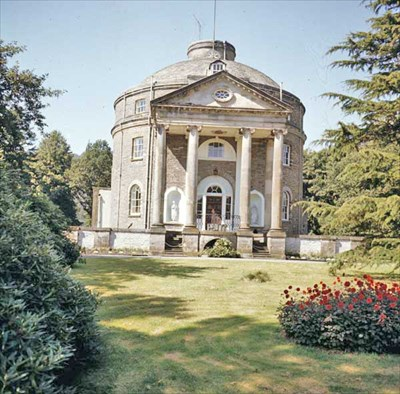
Island House, Belle Isle, Windemere

Island House was built in 1774 to designs by John Plaw. It is unusual in that it is circular in plan, built of brick, three floors high with a four column portico; it draws closely on the Pantheon, Rome. The house was sold along with the island to the wealthy Curwen family who renamed the island after their daughter, Isabella. It was then sold on to Isabella Curwen by her family in 1781 for £1,720 and was permanently renamed after her. The descendants of Isabella and her husband John Christian Curwen lived on the island until 1993.

It is called 'Bell Island' not 'Isabella Island' because of use of the shortened form of Isabella- Bella, which lost the 'a' to become 'Bell', spelt 'Belle' by the Ordnance Survey map of 1925 over the years. It was known locally as the Great Island or Long Holme and formerly known as Longholm, before its renaming in 1774.

In 1996 (some records suggest 23 December 1994), Belle Isle House suffered serious damage following a large fire. However, it was repaired and is once again a place of residence.
