= Anne Frances Byrne =

British artist (1775–1837)

- Born: 1775
- Died: 1837 (aged 61–62)
- Known for: Painting

Anne Frances Byrne (1775–1837) was a British watercolour painter. Her subject material consisted mainly of birds, fruit and flowers painted in a realistic style. Anne came from a family of artists and occasionally butted heads with her contemporaries and faced criticisms due to sexism among artists and painters in her time.

== Life and Family ==
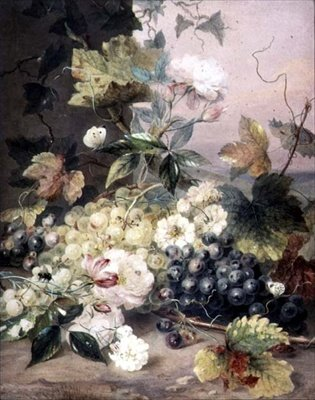
Roses and Grapes

Anne Frances Byrne was born in 1775 in London. Her mother's name is unknown but her father was William Byrne, a notable engraver who specialized in landscapes. Anne was the oldest of her four other siblings, all of whom went on to become artists themselves. Mary Byrne Green was the second oldest Byrne sibling, a student of Swiss painting, and specialized in miniature painted landscapes. Letitia Byrne was the youngest Byrne sister, and she became popularized for her etchings and engravings, a craft that William Byrne passed down to his children. Her work also focused mainly on landscapes. John Byrne was the youngest of the five Byrne children and he lived with his sister Elizabeth Byrne. They specialised in landscapes, although his medium of choice was watercolour. Anne Frances Byrne and her siblings grew up helping in their father's engraving shop and learned artistic techniques from him before going off on their own to study under masters. Anne Frances Byrne died in January 1837 at the age of 62.

== The Academy ==
Anne Frances Byrne started off painting with oil paints early in her career, but later moved on to watercolours as her medium of choice. She exhibited her first piece, a fruit painting, in 1796 at 21 years old. She had a rocky relationship with the academy due to the sexism that was predominant in the art world and in society at the time. This relationship was characterized by Byrne's inability to decide whether or not to continue to be a part of the academy. Byrne became a full member of the Royal Watercolour Society in 1809, withdrew her membership in 1813, rejoined in 1821, and left again in 1834. Harriet Gouldsmith, one of Byrne's contemporaries, wrote that when art of the time was praised, "the highest praise bestowed [and] publicly exhibited… was in great measure retracted when the picture was understood to be the production of a female". Although Gouldsmith wrote about her own work, this experience was widespread among females in art at the time. The effect is still noticeable today due to the lack of documentation of Anne Frances Byrne and her contemporaries. The works of women in this time were often less respected simply due to the gender of the artist, and not based upon the merit of the work itself.

== Notable works ==
The following works were exhibited at the Royal Society of British Artists and the Royal Watercolour Society. Byrne is noted to have exhibited 77 total works in London exhibitions between 1796 and 1837.

- Hollyhock
- Roses From Nature
- Foxgloves From Nature
- Flowers and Grapes
- Roses and Grapes
- Grapes and Strawberries
