= Britannia Depicta =

Road atlas of Britain first published in 1720

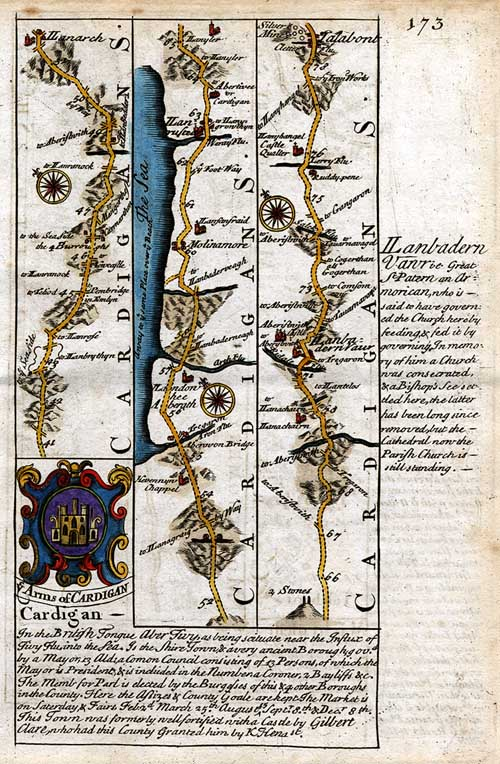
Illustration from Bowen's Britannica Depicta

Britannia Depicta or Ogilby improv'd was an illustrated road atlas for Britain. It was printed in numerous editions over many decades from 1720 into the 19th century and updated with engravings by many artisans who worked from drawings of other artists. It featured strip maps.

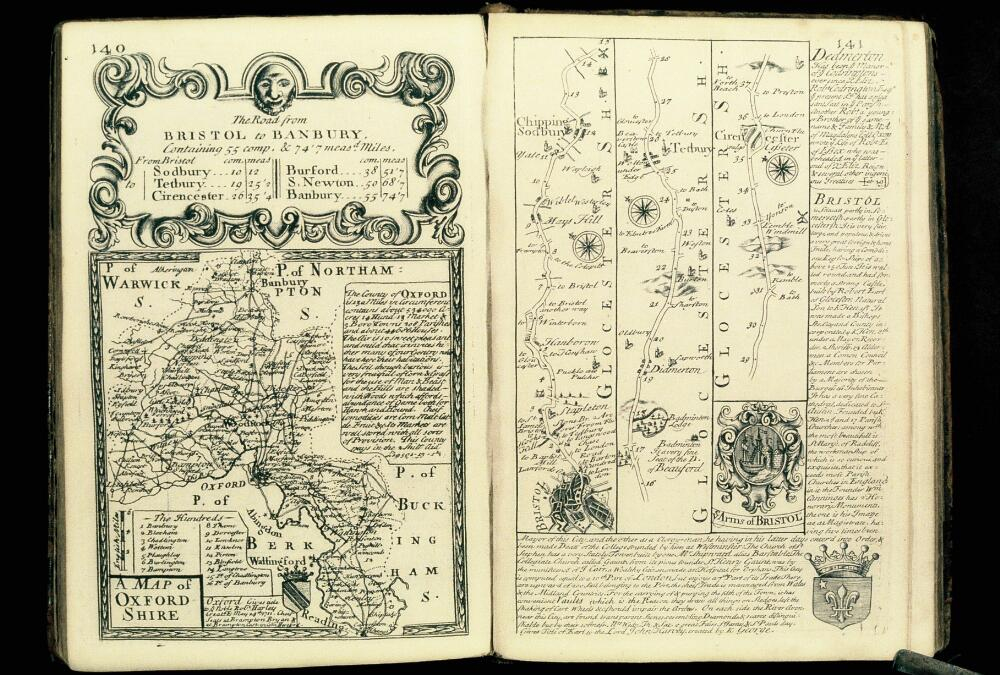
Road from Bristol to Banbury

The atlas was based on the earlier work of John Ogilby who published his Britannia, the first British road atlas drawn to scale, in 1675. Britannia Depicta was printed in 1720 by Emanuel Bowen and John Owen's firm Bowen & Owen. It was one of Bowen's earliest works.

A road atlas, it contains two hundred and seventy three road maps along with drawings of landmarks and miniature county maps of each of the counties of England and Wales. It augmented John Ogilby's original with additional historical and heraldic detail. As the atlas was printed with maps on both sides of each page, this resulted in a handier-sized book.

== Cadell & Davies editions ==
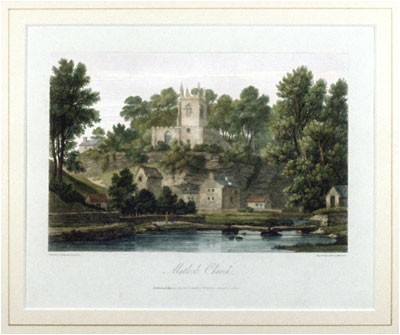
Matlock, Derbyshire church from a painting by Joseph Farington

Cadell & Davies published its own editions of the Britannia Depicta atlas over many years, with accompanying descriptions by Samuel Lysons. Engraved plates for their Britannia Depicta are dated 1803–1818.

The Quarterly Review of 1816 reported it was ordered along with Magna Britannia.

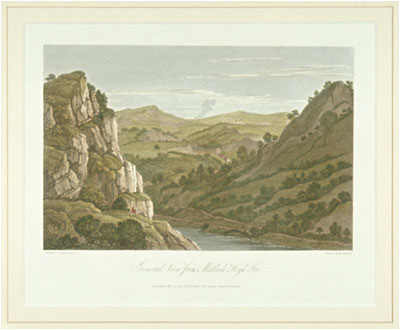
View from Matlock High Tor from a painting by Joseph Farington

Landscapes by Joseph Farington were included in Cadell and Davies' six-volume "modernisation" of the illustrated atlas. His contributions include topographical Views in Cornwall (1814) and other views. He also depicted Devon for a 7th edition and had his drawings engraved but they were never published.

=== Engravers ===
Engravers who worked on the Cadell & Davies editions include:

- William Angus (engraver) 1752–1821
- M. S. Barenger
- John Byrne (engraver), 1786–1847
- Letitia Byrne 1779–1849
- William Byrne (engraver) 1743–1805
- George Cooke (engraver) 1781–1834
- Frederick Rudolph Hay 1784–?
- John Landseer 1769–1852
- Samuel Middiman ca. 1750–1831
- James Neagle 1760?–1822
- Charles Pye (engraver) 1777–1864
- John Pye 1782–1874
- John Scott (engraver) 1774–1827
- Thomas Woolnoth, 1785–1857
- William Woolnoth 1780–1837

=== Illustrators ===
Illustrations in the Cadell & Davies editions were made by artists including:

- William Alexander 1767–1816
- John Byrne 1786–1847
- Joseph Farington 1747–1821
- Thomas Hearne 1744–1817
- Frederick Nash 1782–1856
- John Powell, 1780-ca. 1833
- Robert Smirke 1752–1845
- John Smith (perhaps John Raphael Smith?)
- William Turner
- J. M. W. Turner (Joseph Mallord William), 1775–1851
- John Varley 1778–1842
- Thomas Webster 1800–1886
