= Mary Green (painter) =

British painter (1766–1845)

- Born: Mary Byrne; 1766
- Died: 22 October 1845 (aged 78–79)
- Known for: Painting
- Spouse: James Green (1805-)

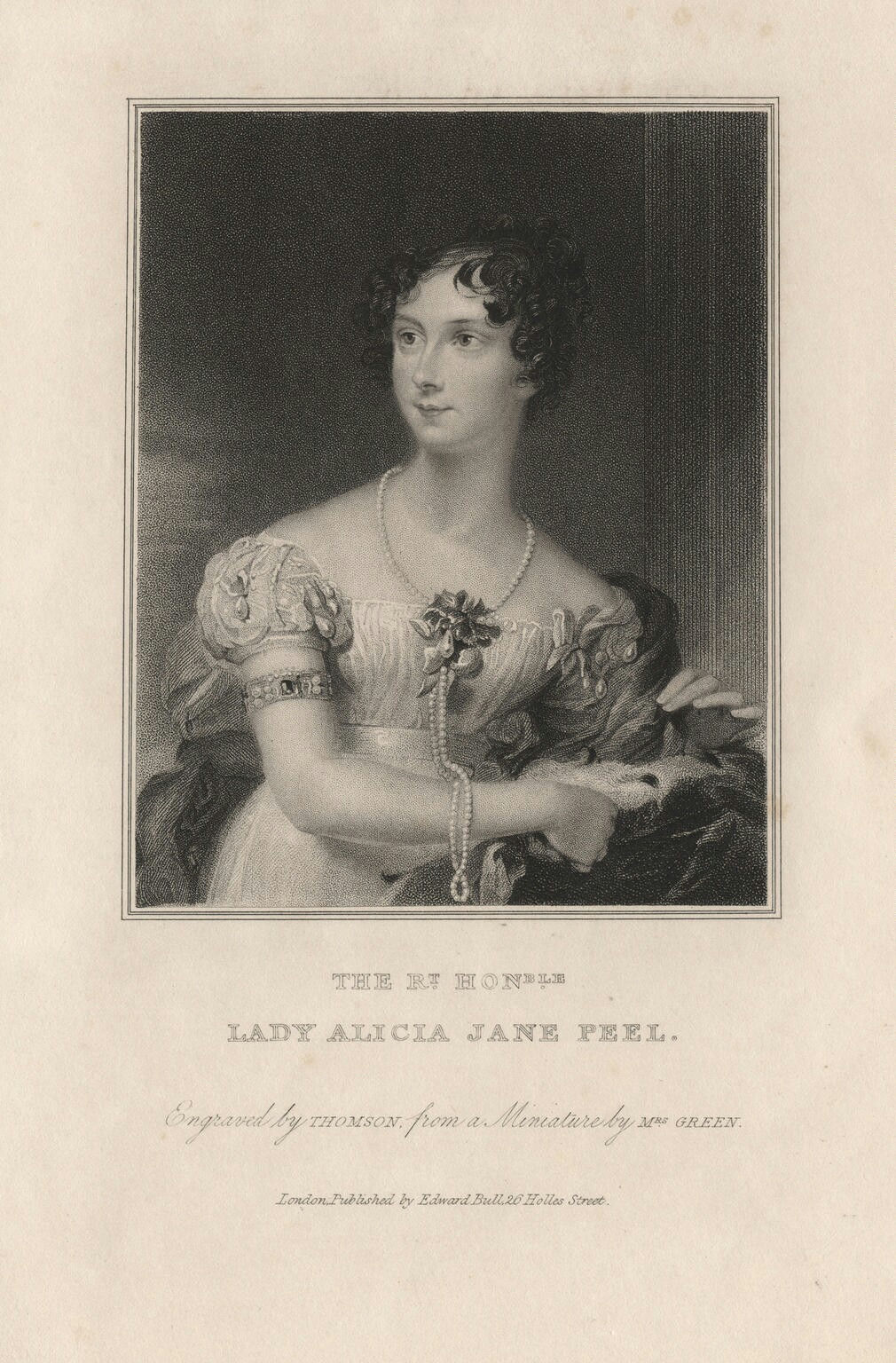
Lady Alicia Jane Peel by James Thomson, after Mary Green (née Byrne), 1833

Mary Green, born Mary Byrne (1766 – 22 October 1845), was a British painter who exhibited at the Royal Academy at the beginning of the nineteenth century.

== Life ==
Mary Byrne was born in 1766. She was the second daughter of engraver William Byrne. Her brother, John Byrne, was also an artist. Her father engraved landscapes, and Mary became a miniature painter after studying with Arlaud. Her work was accepted for exhibition at the Royal Academy in 1795, and continued to exhibit there until 1835. She also exhibited at other institutions until 1845, including the British Institution and the Society of British Artists. She married the painter James Green on 13 February 1805 in Marylebone and their children included the notable painter Benjamin Richard Green. Mary Green died on 22 October 1845 and was buried in Kensal Green Cemetery.

== Legacy ==
Some of Green's correspondence is in the Victoria and Albert Museum, and her portrait of Queen Adelaide is in the Royal Collection.
