= Samuel Middiman =

English engraver (1750-1831)

- Born: 1750
- Died: 20 December 1831 (aged 80–81); London
- Occupation: Engraver

Samuel Middiman (1750–1831) was a British engraver.

== Life ==
He first appeared as an exhibitor of landscape drawings at the Incorporated Society of Artists in 1772 and following years, and in 1780 he exhibited drawings at the Royal Academy. He studied engraving under William Byrne, and is also said to have had instruction in this art from William Woollett. He was employed as an engraver by John Boydell for several years.

Middiman died in Cirencester Place, London, on 20 December 1831.

== Works ==
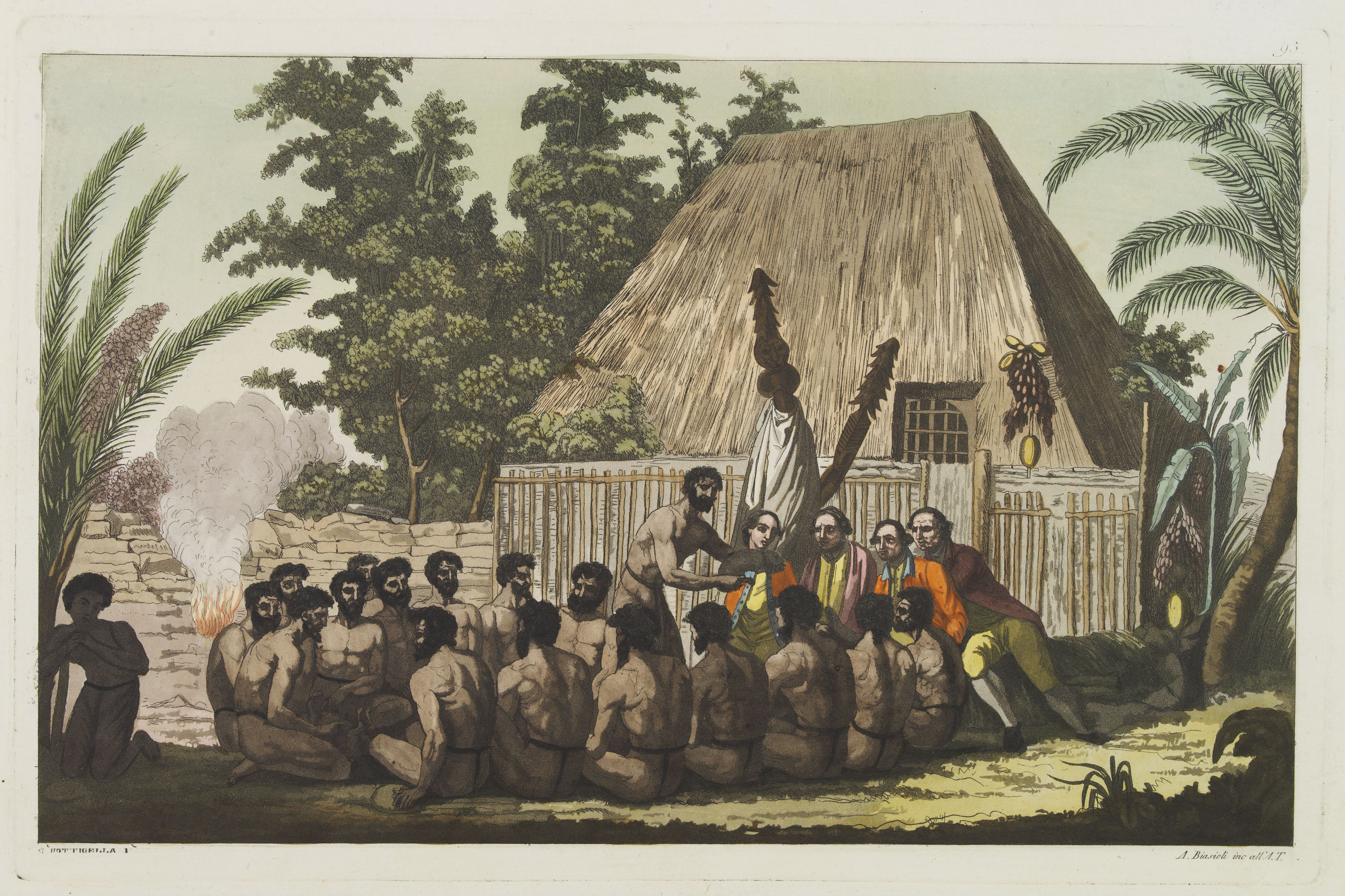
Offering before Capt. Cook in the Sandwich Islands, engraving by Samuel Middiman after John Webber.

Middiman engraved for Boydell, in the Shakespeare Gallery:

- As you like it, act ii. scene 1, after William Hodges;
- Winter's Tale, act iii. scene 3, after Joseph Wright of Derby;
- First Part of Henry IV, act ii. scene 2, after Robert Smirke, and Joseph Farington; and
- As you like it, act ii. scene 1, after John Boydell.

Middiman was known for his engraving of landscape, as a follower out by Woollett and others. He did preliminary work for others, as well as many engravings of his own, after well-known artists, most of which appeared in the following publications:

- Select Views in Great Britain, 1784–92, 53 plates (2nd edit. 1812);
- Picturesque Castles and Abbeys in England and Wales, 1805–8, 16 plates; and
- Picturesque Views and Antiquities of Great Britain, 1807–11, 69 plates.

A collection of his engravings in progressive states are in the Department of Prints and Drawings at the British Museum.
