= Thomas Woolnoth =

English engraver

Thomas Alfred Woolnoth (1785–1857) was an English engraver. He was known for his portraits of theatre people. He also painted, and engraved works of Correggio and Van Dyck. Woolnoth was engraver to Queen Victoria. His work was also included in Cadell and Davies Britannia depicta.
