= William Woolnoth =

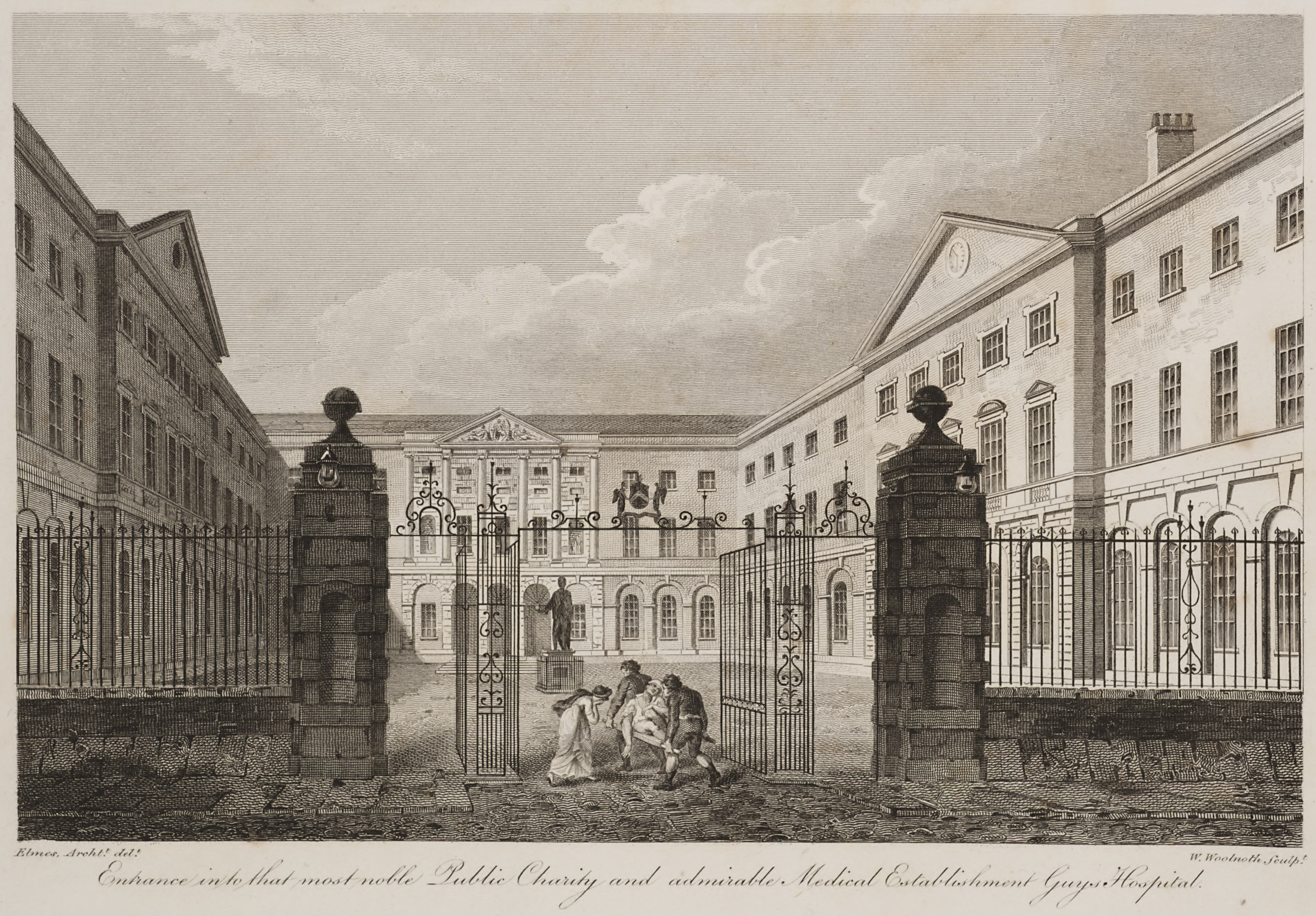
Woolnoth's engraving of Guy's Hospital Entrance based on a drawing by James Elmes

William Woolnoth (1780–1837) was an engraver. He was one of the engravers whose work was included in Cadell and Davies Britannia depicta. He did engravings of work by artists such as Thomas Mann Baynes, Robert Blemmell Schnebbelie, Frederick Wilton Litchfield Stockdale and Thomas Allom. He also did the engravings for Edward William Brayley's The ancient castles of England and Wales. He did the engravings for a book that he published in 1816 on the cathedral church of Canterbury (A graphical illustration of the metropolitan cathedral church of Canterbury; accompanied by a history and description of that venerable fabric) According to Oxford Reference he also did engraving work in Spain. He was also one of the engravers for The Architecture of M. Vitruvius Pollio in Ten Books (De architectura).

His engravings are part of the British Museum collection and National Archives. An engraving by Woolnoth is also included in the Gott Collection of William Gott, a wool merchant, and his son John Gott who was vicar of Leeds and Bishop of Truro.
