= Frederick Stockdale =

Frederick Stockdale may refer to:

- Freddie Stockdale (1947–2018), British opera impresario
- Frederick Wilton Litchfield Stockdale (1786–1858), British artist
