= Letitia Byrne =

British engraver

- Born: 24 November 1779
- Died: 2 May 1849 (aged 69)
- Known for: Engraving

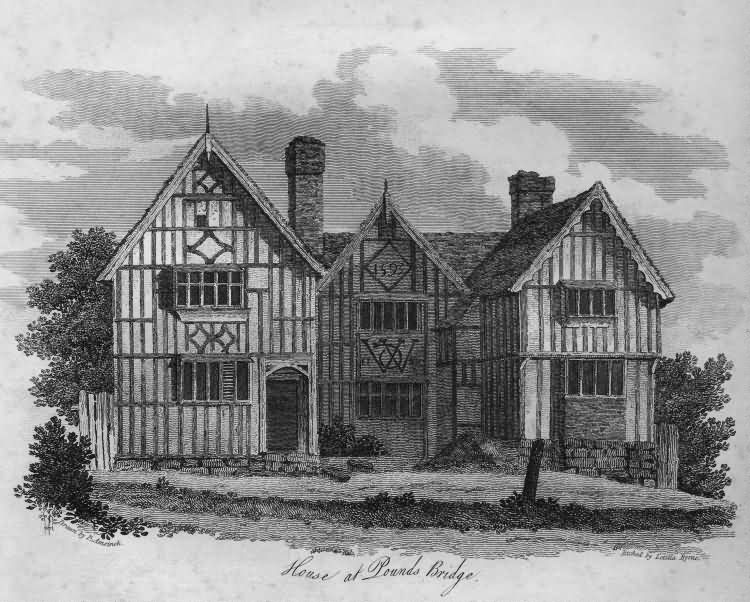
An engraving by Letitia Byrne and Paul Amsinck

Letitia Byrne (1779–1849) was a British engraver.

== Life ==
She was born on 24 November 1779, presumably in London, being the third daughter of William Byrne, engraver, and the sister of Anne Frances Byrne, Elizabeth Byrne, and John Byrne. As a pupil of her father, she exhibited landscape-views at the academy when she was only twenty, in 1799.

In 1810, she etched the illustrations for A Description of Tunbridge Wells and four views for Hakewill's History of Windsor. She exhibited From Eton College Play-fields at the academy in 1822; and had other pictures there (twenty-one in all) down to 1848. Her work was included in Cadell & Davies Britannia depicta.

She died 2 May 1849, aged 69, and was buried at Kensal Green.
