= John Byrne (English artist) =

English artist (1786–1847)

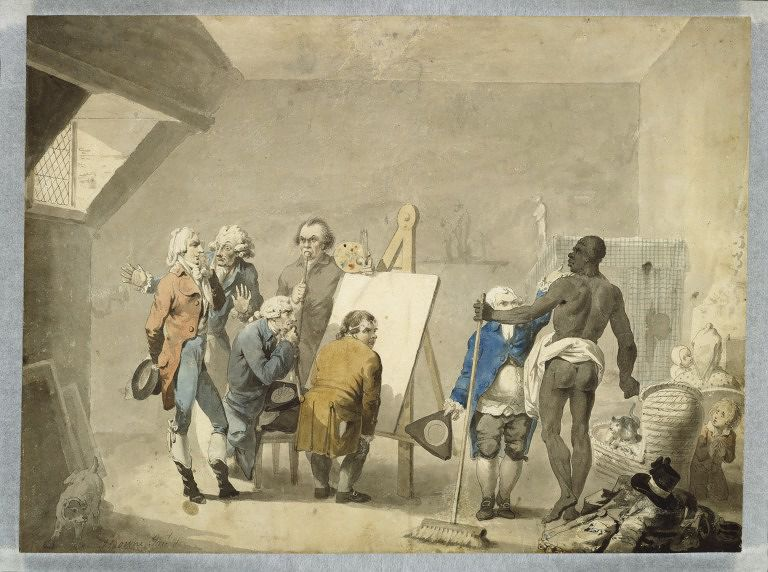
A Meeting of Connoisseurs, watercolour, including a self-portrait, V&A

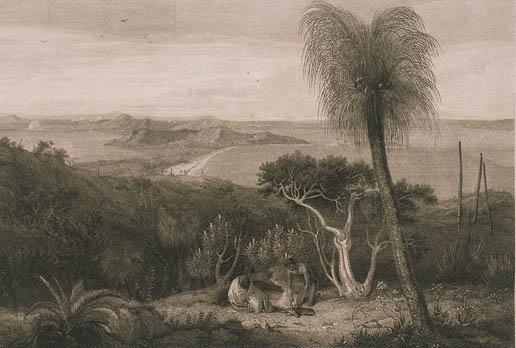
View from the south side of King George's Sound, first published in Matthew Flinders' 1814 A voyage to Terra Australis. After a painting by William Westall.

John Byrne (1786–1847) was an English painter and engraver. He came from a family of artists and he lived with his sister Elizabeth Byrne who also exhibited her landscapes.

== Life ==
He was the only son of engraver William Byrne and followed his father's profession in the arts. After his father's death in 1805, he moved to 54 John Street, London. He had four sisters who were all talented artists including Elizabeth Byrne who lived with him. Elizabeth exhibited her own landscapes starting in 1838. The views were of foreign as well as British locations. She created six steel engravings for Thomas H. Shepherd's "Modern Athens". This was published in 1829. Her last known work to be exhibited was in 1849.

He provided sets of engravings for Charles Wild's works on cathedrals.

Byrne around 1818 was drawing-master at Eton College. He subsequently concentrated on landscape painting in watercolours; his sister Mary and her son were also painters.

His work is included in Cadell and Davies' Britannia depicta. He sent pictures to the exhibitions of the Water-Colour Society and the Royal Academy; and spent some years (about 1832–37) in Italy. He died in 1847. In the Victoria and Albert Museum are:

- The Ferry at Twickenham (exhibited in 1830).
- Italian Landscape, with Monastery.
- A Meeting of Connoisseurs

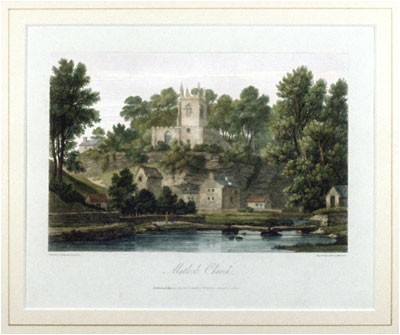
Matlock church: engraving by John and Letitia Byrne after a painting by Joseph Farington. Published in 1817 in Britannia Depicta, Part VI, Derbyshire
