= Frederick Rudolph Hay =

Scottish engraver

- Born: 1784; Edinburgh
- Died: 20 September 1870 (aged 85–86); London

Frederick Rudolph Hay (1784 – 20 September 1870) was a Scottish engraver known for his landscape and architectural work.

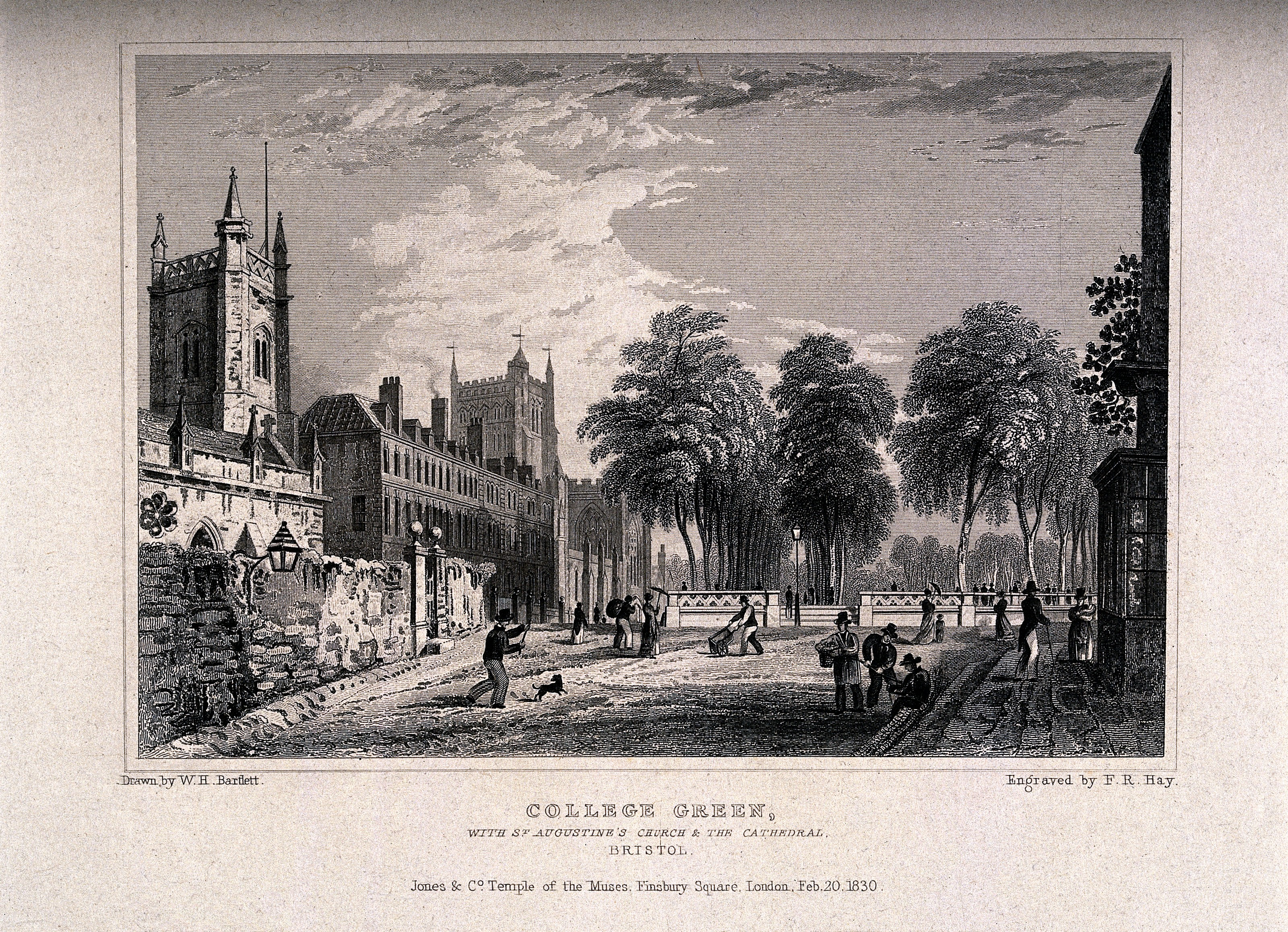
Line engraving of "Avenue leading to the College Green with St. Augustine's church and cathedral, Bristol" by Frederick Rudolph Hay from a drawing by W.H. Bartlett

He was born in Edinburgh and studied under Robert Scott before moving in 1805 to London where he spent the rest of his career. He died in London, aged 85.

His work was included in Britannia depicta.

== Books with his works ==
Engravings Of The Most Noble The Marquis Of Stafford's Collection Of Pictures, In London, Arranged According To Schools, And In Chronological Order, With Remarks On Each Picture. By William Young Ottley, Esq. F.S.A. The Executive Part Under The Management Of Peltro William Tomkins, Esq. Historical Engraver To Her Majesty. - Vol. I. (- IV.)

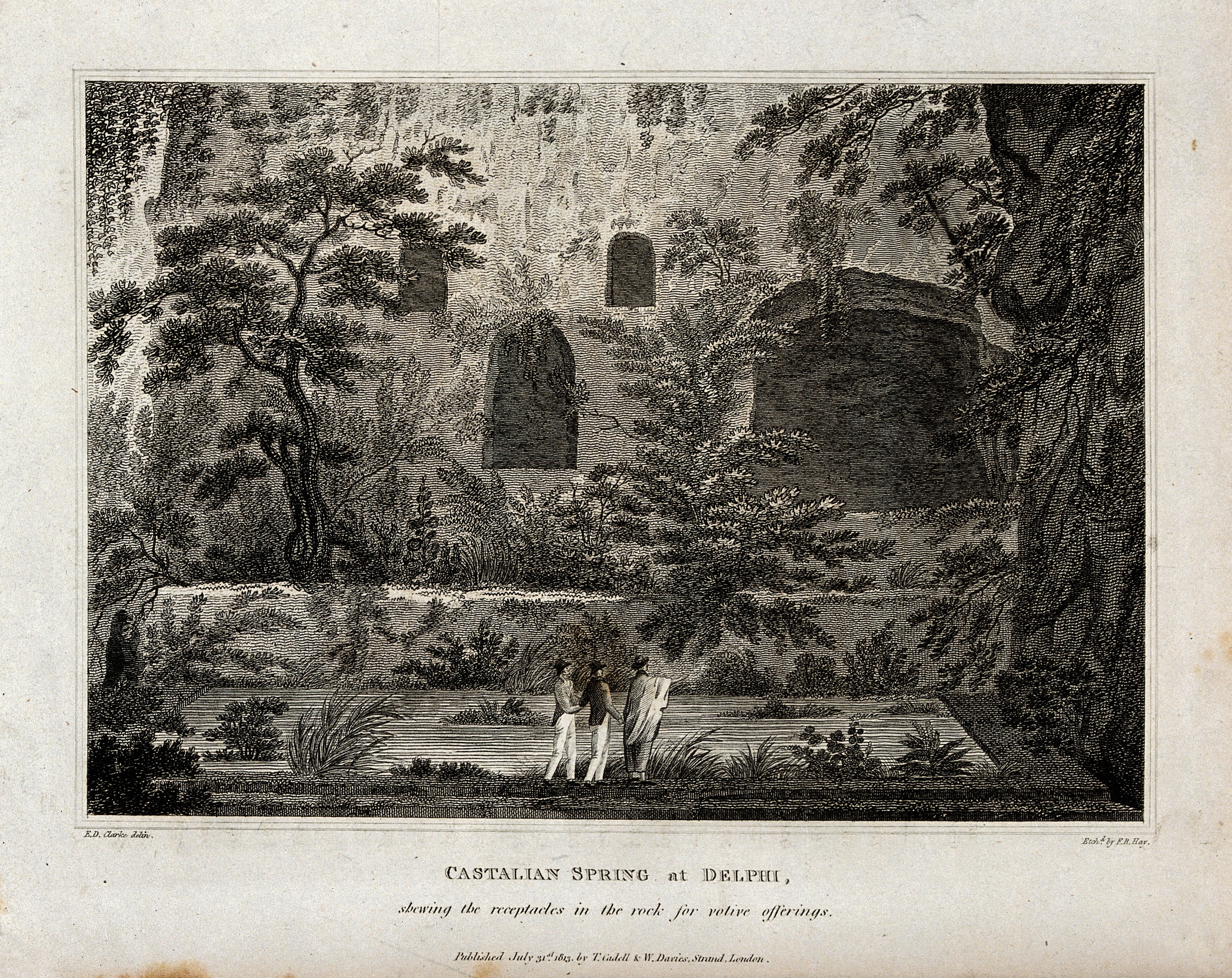
Etching of Edward Daniel Clarke's Castalian Spring at Delphi

Modern Athens! Displayed In A Series Of Views: Or Edinburgh In The Nineteenth Century: Exhibiting The Whole Of The New Buildings, Modern Improvements, Antiquities, And Picturesque Scenery, Of The Scottish Metropolis And Its Environs, From Original Drawings, By Mr. Thomas H. Shepherd. With Historical, Topographical, And Critical Illustrations.

The Arabian Antiquities Of Spain. By James Cavanah Murphy.
