= George Farington =

English artist (1752–1788)

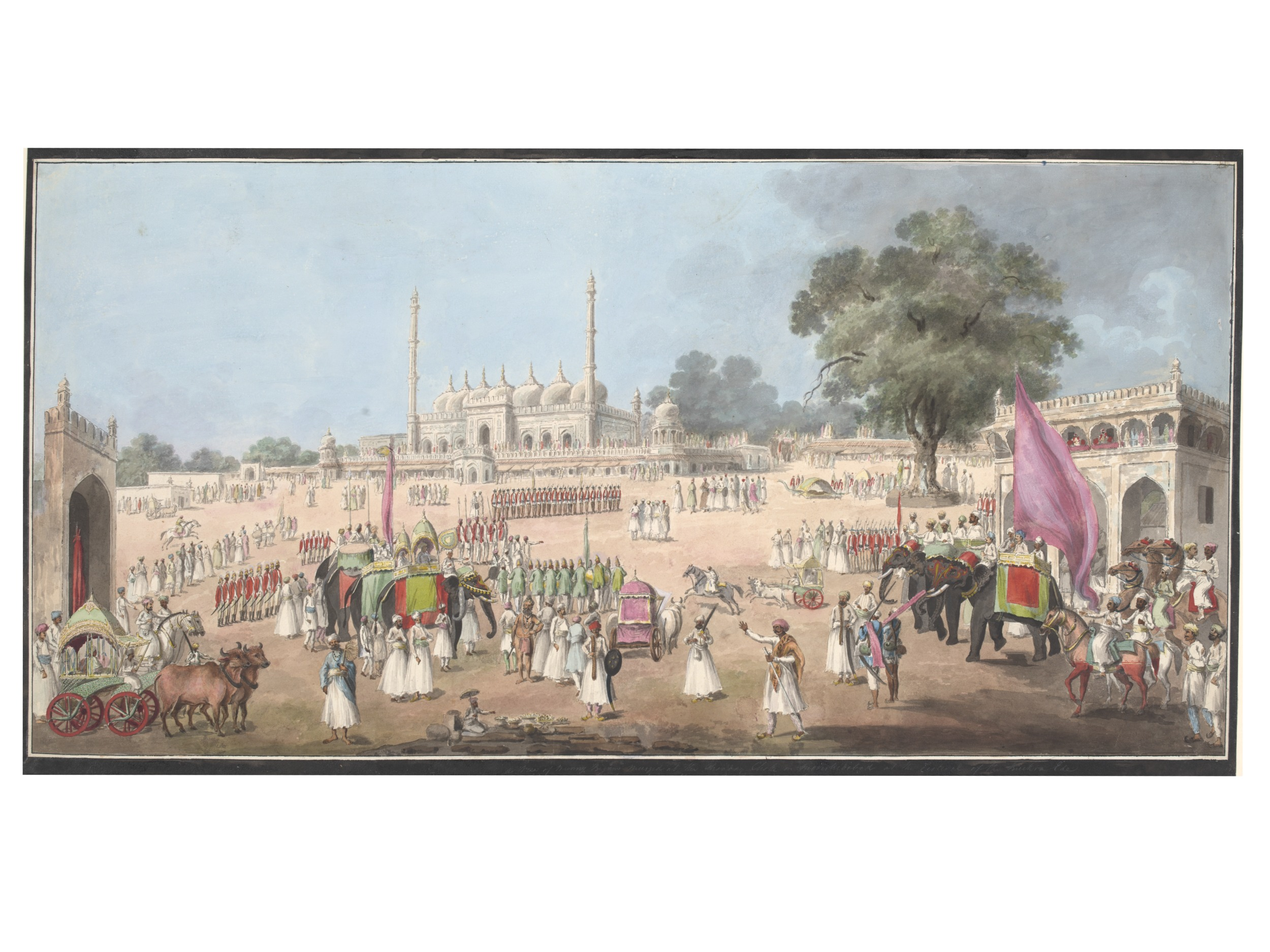
Mubarak ud-Daula, Nawab of Murshidabad by an unknown Murshidabad artist who copied it from an original oil painting by George Farington, Victoria and Albert Museum

George Farington (1752–1788) was an English artist.

== Life ==
Farington was born at Leigh, Lancashire, his baptism being recorded on 10 November 1752, and was fourth son of the Rev. William Farington, vicar of there, who was later rector of Warrington. He was for many years a student of the Royal Academy, and obtained the silver medal in 1779, and in 1780 he won the gold medal for the best historical picture, the subject being 'The Caldron Scene from Macbeth.' He had in his early studies been guided by his brother Joseph Farington the landscape-painter, but his preference being for historical subjects he became a pupil of Benjamin West. John Boydell gave him many commissions, and for him he made several drawings from the Houghton collection.

In 1782 he went to India, practising his art. When making studies for a grand picture of the court of the Nawab of Murshidabad, he fell ill, and died there a few days later in 1788.
