= James Green (artist) =

English portrait painter (1771–1834)

James Green (1771–1834) was an English artist, known as a portrait-painter.

== Life ==
Born at Leytonstone in Essex, 13 March 1771, he was son of a builder. He was apprenticed to Thomas Martyn, who taught natural history painting, at 10 Great Marlborough Street. At the end of his apprenticeship, Green entered the Royal Academy Schools. He attracted the notice of Sir Joshua Reynolds, and in time copied many of his pictures.

Green gradually attained a good reputation for his portraits in watercolour. He resided for many years in South Crescent, Bedford Square, in London.

Green died at Bath, Somerset on 27 March 1834. He was buried in Wolcot Church.

== Works ==
In 1792 Green first exhibited at the Royal Academy, sending views of Oxford Market and Chapel; in 1793 he exhibited views of Tunbridge Wells, and some portraits.

Many of Green's portraits were engraved, including those of:

- Benjamin West, and Sir Richard Birnie, both engraved in mezzotint by William Say;
- George Cook the actor, as Iago, engraved in mezzotint by James Ward;
- Joseph Charles Horsley, the stolen child, engraved by R. Cooper.

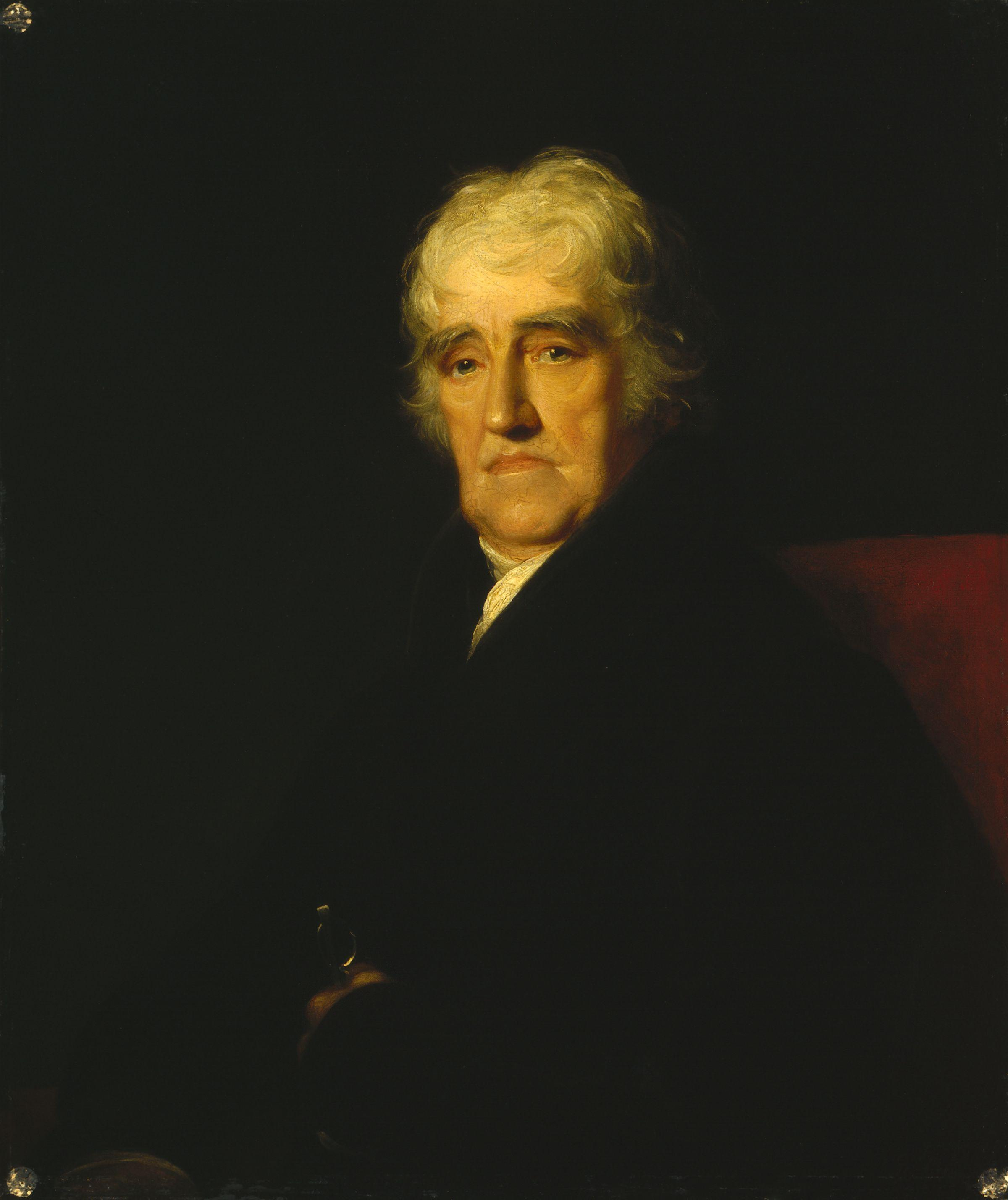
Portrait of Thomas Stothard.

In the National Portrait Gallery, London there are portraits by him of Thomas Stothard, and Sir John Ross, the latter being Green's last work. The portrait of Stothard was engraved by Edward Scriven for The Library of the Fine Arts, April 1833.

Green painted large subject pictures in oil, including Zadig and Astarte, exhibited 1826, and engraved in the Literary Souvenir, 1828; Béarnaise Woman and Canary, engraved in the Literary Souvenir, 1827, and Belinda. His picture of The Loves conducted by the Graces to the Temple of Hymen was painted in water-colour.

Green also was a frequent exhibitor at the British Institution, and in 1808 was awarded a premium of £60. He was a member of the Associated Society of Artists in Water-Colours. Many of his pictures were commissions, notably from Francis Chaplin of Riseholme, Lincolnshire.

== Family ==
In 1805 Green married Mary, second daughter of William Byrne. She was a pupil of Arlaud, and was a miniature-painter, exhibiting at the Royal Academy from 1795 to 1835. On her husband's death she retired from her profession, and died 22 October 1845, being buried at Kensal Green. Her copies after Joshua Reynolds and Thomas Gainsborough were valued. Their children were Benjamin Richard Green and a daughter.

== Notes ==
Attribution

This article incorporates text from a publication now in the public domain: "Green, James (1771-1834)". Dictionary of National Biography. London: Smith, Elder & Co. 1885–1900.
