= Benjamin Richard Green =

English watercolour painter and author (1807/8–1876)

Benjamin Richard Green (1807/8–1876) was an English watercolour painter and author. He exhibited at the Royal Academy and Suffolk Street exhibitions from 1832, and executed several works in lithography besides watercolours.

== Life ==
Benjamin Richard Green, born in London in 1807 or 1808, was son of James Green, the portrait painter. He studied art in the schools of the Royal Academy, and painted both figures and landscapes, mostly in watercolour. He was elected in 1834 a member of the Institute of Painters in Water-Colours. Green was very much employed as a teacher of drawing and a lecturer. He exhibited frequently at the Royal Academy and the Suffolk Street exhibitions, beginning in 1832, and also at the various exhibitions of paintings in watercolours. In 1829 Green published a numismatic atlas of ancient history, executed in lithography; a French edition of this work was published in the same year. Green also published some works on perspective, a lecture on ancient coins, and a series of heads from the antique. He was for many years secretary of the Artists' Annuity Fund, and died in London on 5 October 1876, aged 68. There is a watercolour drawing by him of the Interior of Stratford-on-Avon Church which entered the collection of the South Kensington Museum.

== Gallery ==
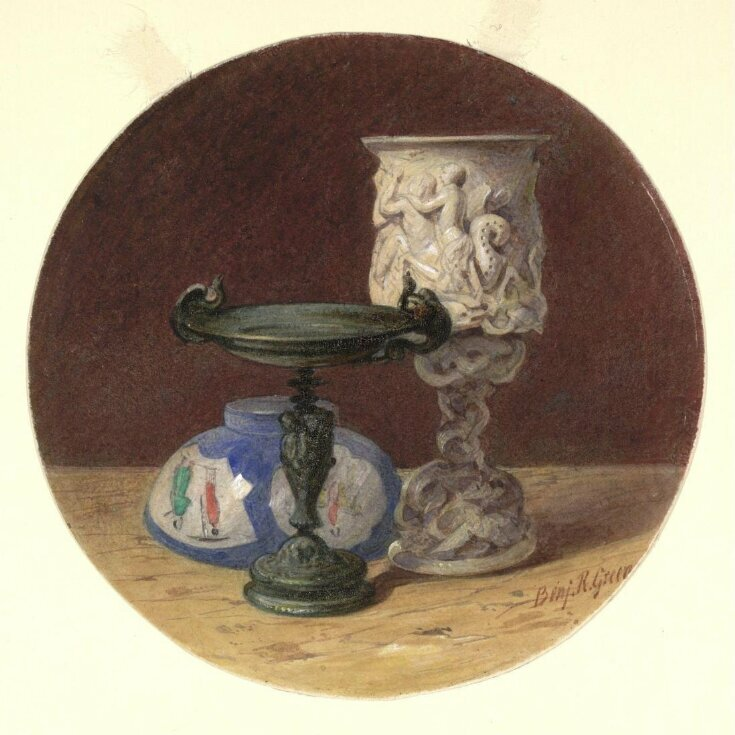
Circular watercolour still life with an ornamental goblet and an upturned bowl, c. 1830–1876.

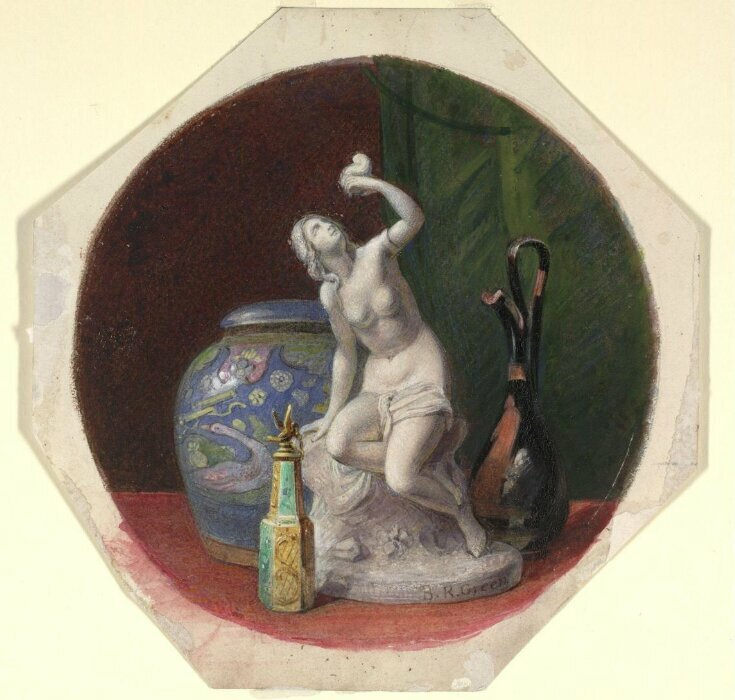
Circular watercolour still life with a small marble sculpture of a seated female, before an urn and a ewer or jug, c. 1830–1876.

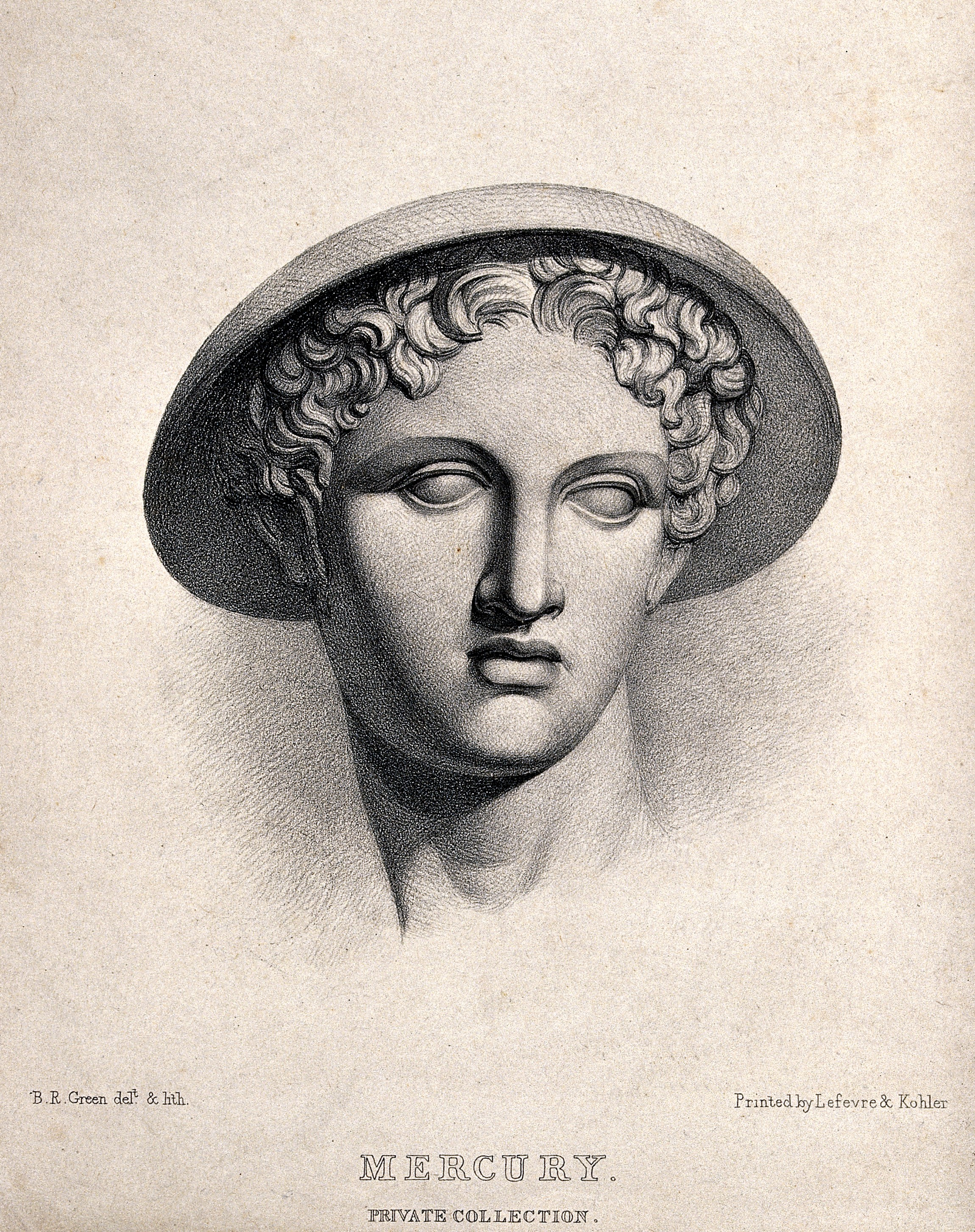
Mercury [Hermes]. Lithograph by B.R. Green.

== Sources ==
- Baker, Anne Pimlott (2004). "Green, Benjamin Richard (1807/8–1876), watercolour painter and author". Oxford Dictionary of National Biography (online ed.). Oxford University Press. doi:10.1093/ref:odnb/11378. (Subscription or UK public library membership required.)

Attribution:

- This article incorporates text from a publication now in the public domain: Cust, Lionel Henry (1890). "Green, Benjamin Richard". In Stephen, Leslie; Lee, Sidney (eds.). Dictionary of National Biography. Vol. 23. London: Smith, Elder & Co. p. 41.
