= Frederick Wilton Litchfield Stockdale =

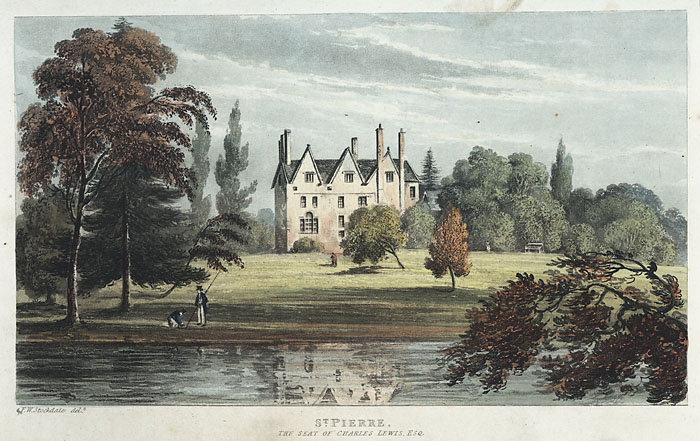
Aquatint print of a work by Stockdale.

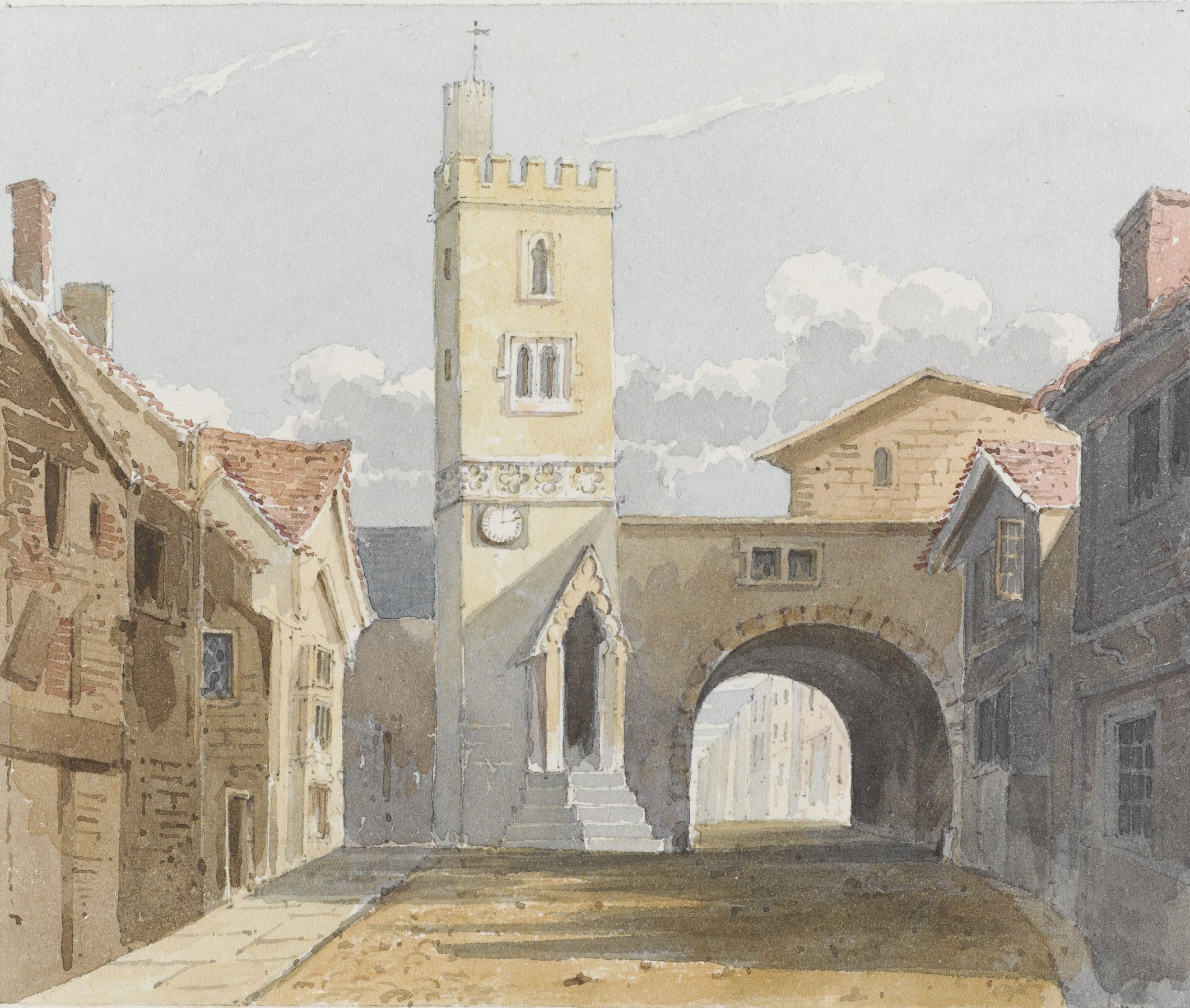
‘Trinity Church, Exeter’, about 1808–1848. This watercolour with pencil depicts the old Trinity Church, Exeter. A church has existed on this site since the thirteenth century. From the Royal Albert Memorial Museum's collection (132/1993)

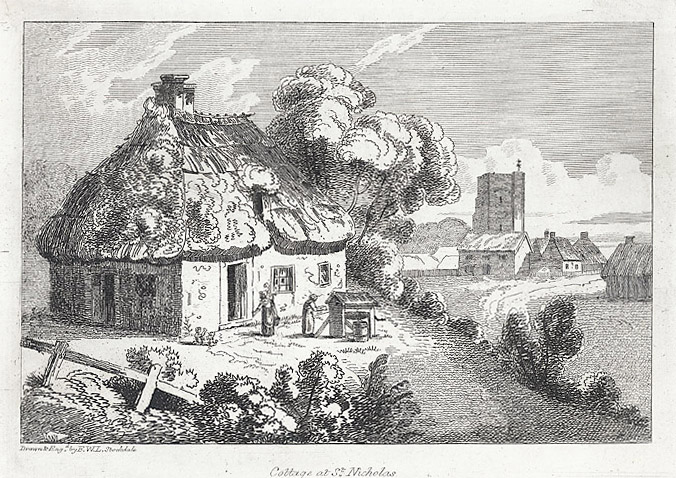

Frederick Wilton Litchfield Stockdale (1786–1858, fl. 1803–1848) was a British artist. Stockdale was primarily a landscape artist, and his work was often published as engravings. He signed his work F.W.L. Stockdale.

After working for the East India Company, Stockdale specialised in the antiquities of southern England and the West Country.

Some of his work is included in the UK Royal Collection and his archives are held by the Devon and Exeter Institution. William Woolnoth did engravings of some of his work.
