= William Byrne (engraver) =

British engraver (1743–1805)

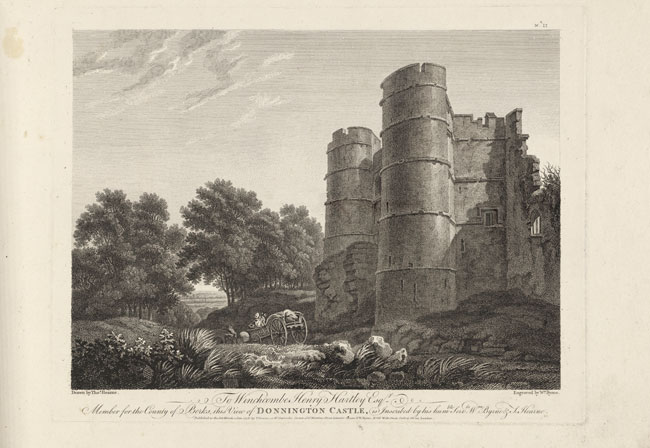
Donnington Castle in 1778, engraved by William Byrne

William Byrne (1743–1805) was a British engraver.

== Life ==
Byrne was born in London in 1743. After studying some time under his uncle, an artist little known, he went to Paris, where he became a pupil of Aliamet, and afterwards of Wille. As well as making individual plates, he worked with Thomas Hearne on the Antiquities of Great Britain, which they jointly published in 1786.

He died in London in 1805 and was buried in Old St. Pancras churchyard.

He was the father of Mary, Anne Frances, Letitia, Elizabeth and John Byrne, all artists. Their mother's name is unknown and William married again to Marianne Francotte in 1792.

Landscape engraver John Landseer was his pupil.

== Works ==
His works are considerable; the following are the most deserving of notice:

- Villa Madama: after R. Wilson (Society of Arts medal, 1765).
- Antiquities of Britain, VOL.1; from drawings by Thomas Hearne (1786).
- Antiquities of Britain, VOL.2; from drawings by Thomas Hearne (1807).
- Views of the Lakes of Cumberland and Westmoreland; after Farrington.
- Scenery of Italy; after the fine designs of Francis Smith.
- Apollo watching the Flocks of King Admetus; after Filippo Lauri; the companion to Woollett's print of Diana and Actaeon.
- The Flight into Egypt; a landscape; after Domenichino.
- Evening; a landscape; after Claude Lorrain.
- Abraham and Lot quitting Egypt; after Zuccarelli; the figures by Bartolozzi.
- A Sea-piece; after Vernet.
- Evening; after Both; the landscape by Byrne, the figures by Bartolozzi.
- Two Views of Leuben, in Saxony; after Dietrich.
- The Death of Captain Cook; the figures by Bartolozzi.
- The Falls of Niagara; after R. Wilson.
- Engraving for Britannia depicta
