= Joseph Powell (painter) =

English watercolour painter and printmaker (1780–1834)

Joseph Powell (Note: John Powell in some sources.) (1780–1834) was an English watercolour painter and printmaker. He was largely engaged as a teacher of painting in watercolours. He executed landscapes chiefly drawn from English scenery, and was a frequent exhibitor at the Royal Academy exhibitions from 1796 to 1829.

== Life ==
Joseph Powell was born in 1780. He painted at first in oils, but subsequently devoted himself almost entirely to watercolours. His subjects were landscapes, chiefly drawn from English scenery, but sometimes of a topographical nature. He was an unsuccessful candidate for the 'Old' Society of Painters in Water-colours at the time of its foundation. Powell was largely engaged as a teacher of painting in water-colours; Samuel Redgrave was among his numerous pupils. Powell was a frequent exhibitor at the Royal Academy exhibitions from 1796 to 1829. He showed also "considerable skill" as an etcher, says Lionel Cust, and published some etchings of trees for the use of his pupils, and some landscape etchings after the old masters. An etching of a landscape by Domenichino, now in the National Gallery, is executed with "much force", in Cust's opinion. He also published a few lithographs. There are watercolour drawings by him in the print-room at the British Museum, and at the Victoria and Albert Museum. He died in 1834.

== Gallery ==
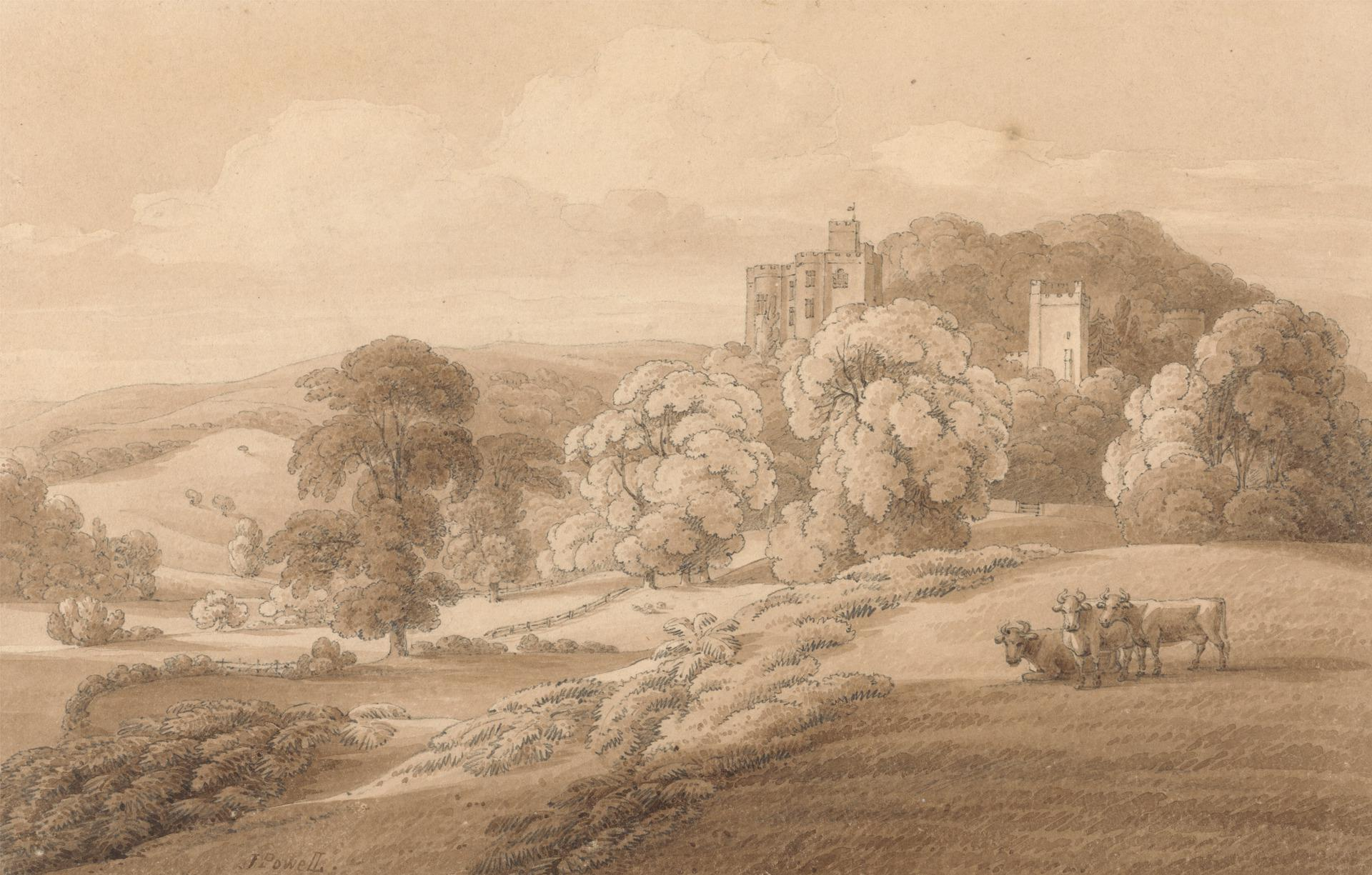
Dunster Castle, Somerset

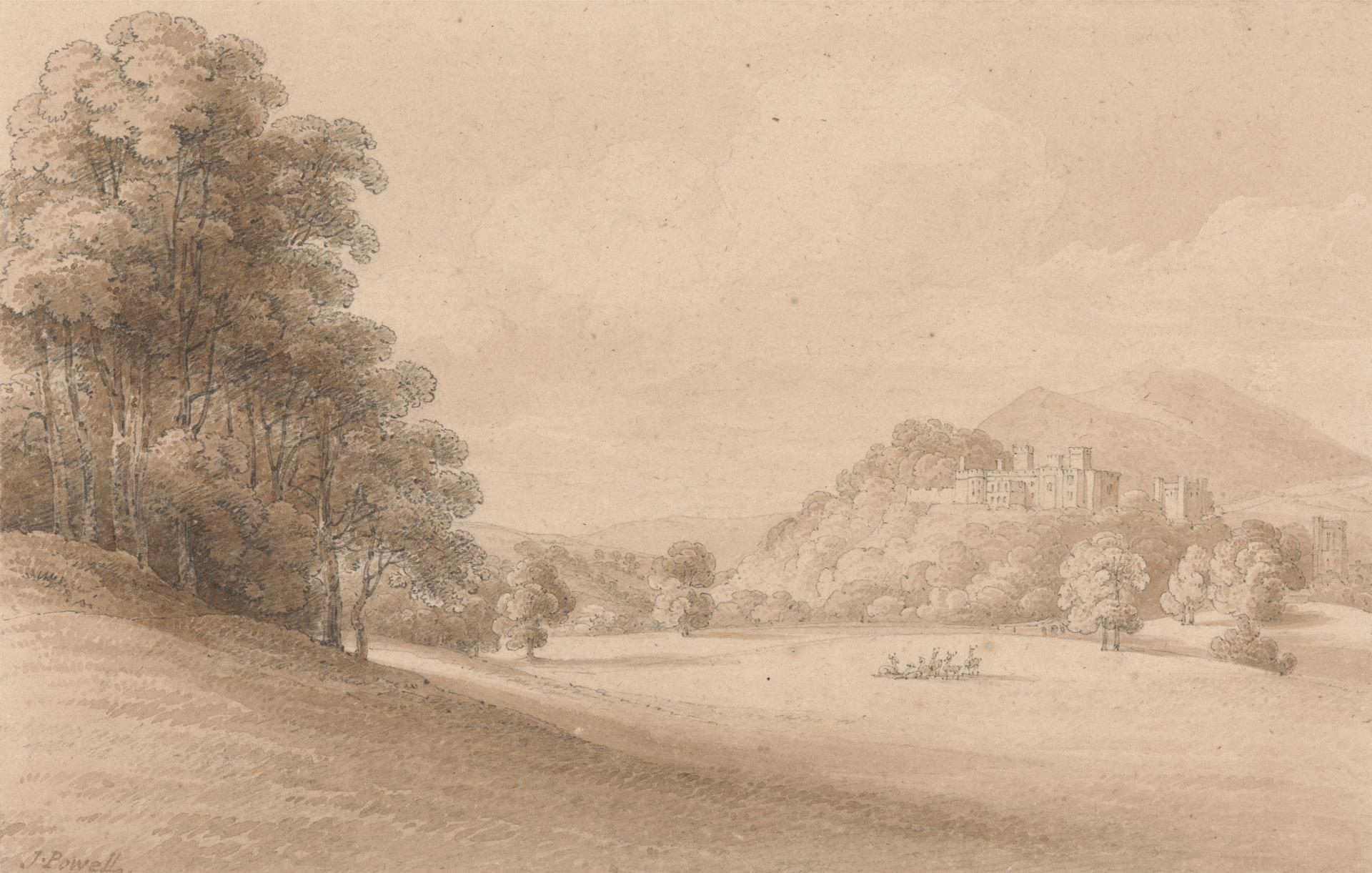
Dunster Castle, Somerset, Showing Castle in Distance

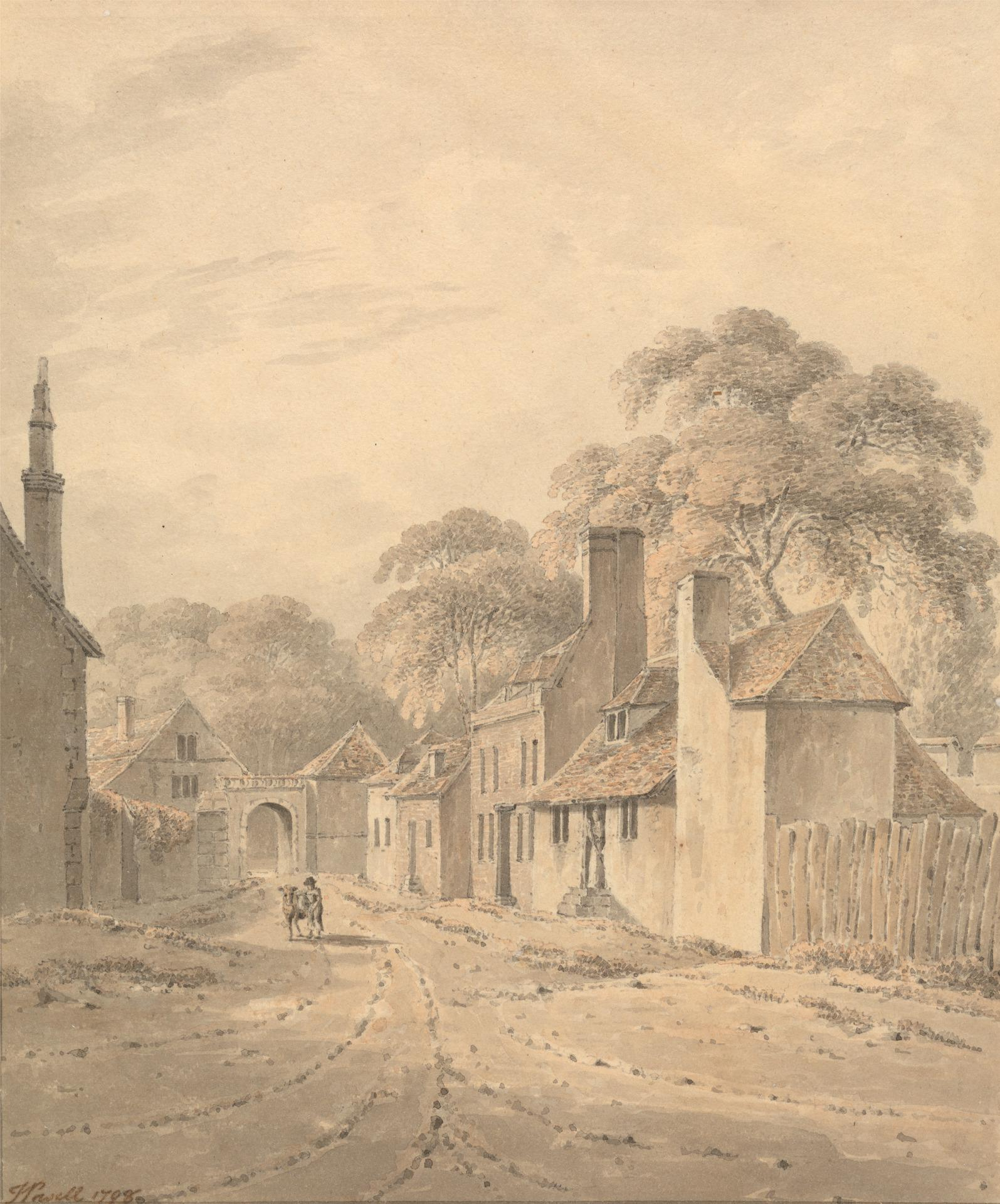
Exeter Gate, Harnham Road, Salisbury

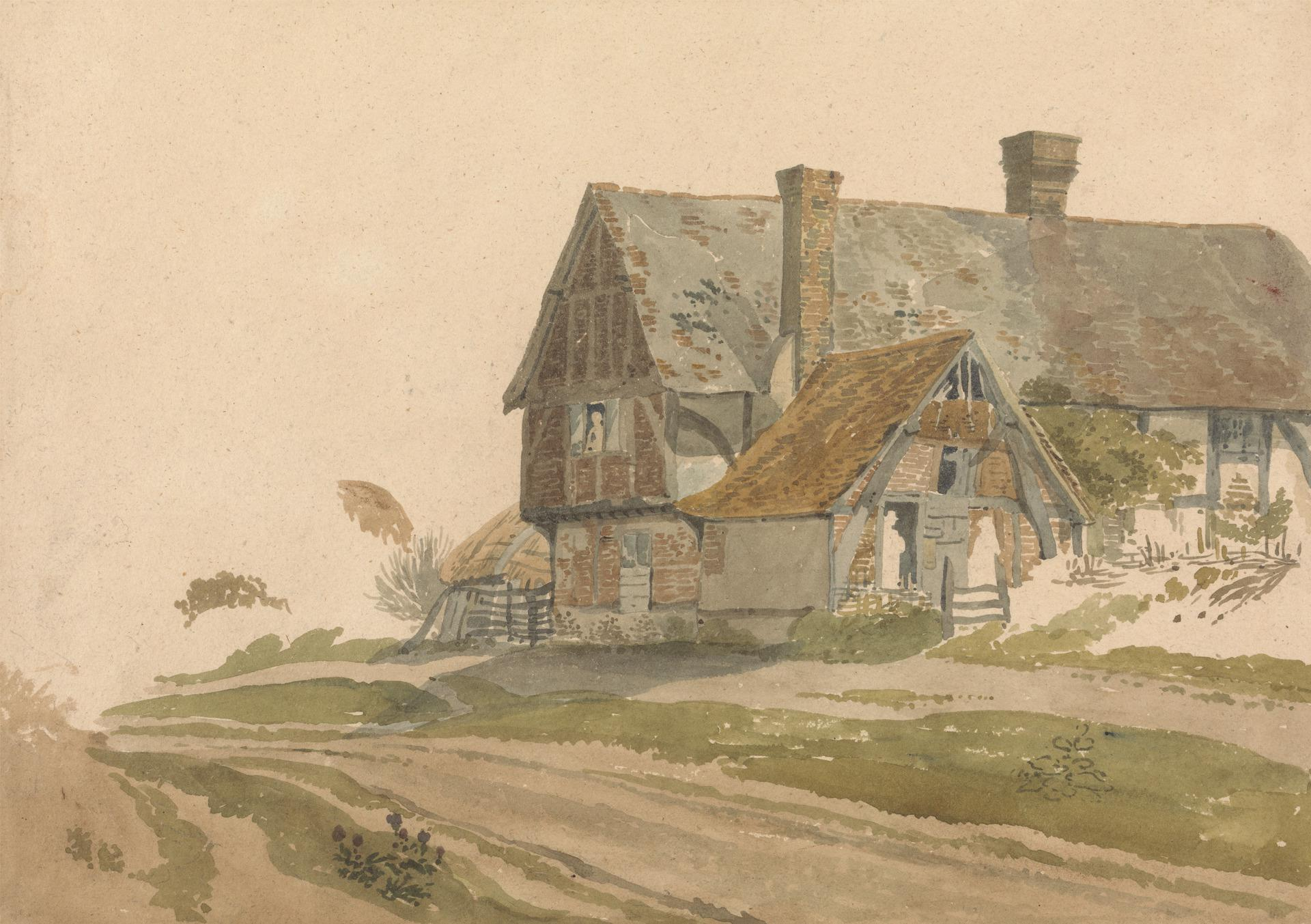
Farmhouse with Figures at Door and Window

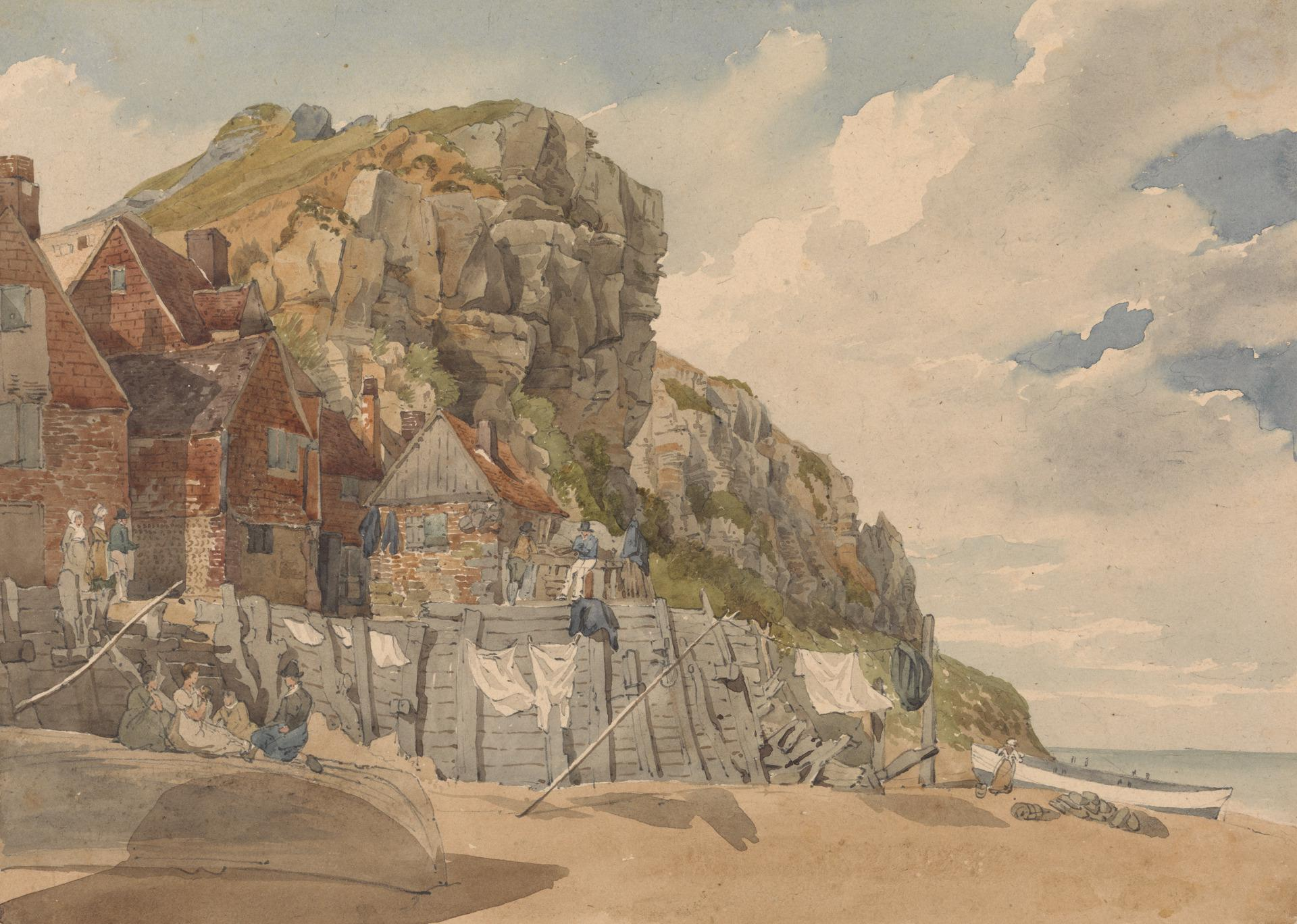
Fisherman's Quarters, Robin Hood's Bay

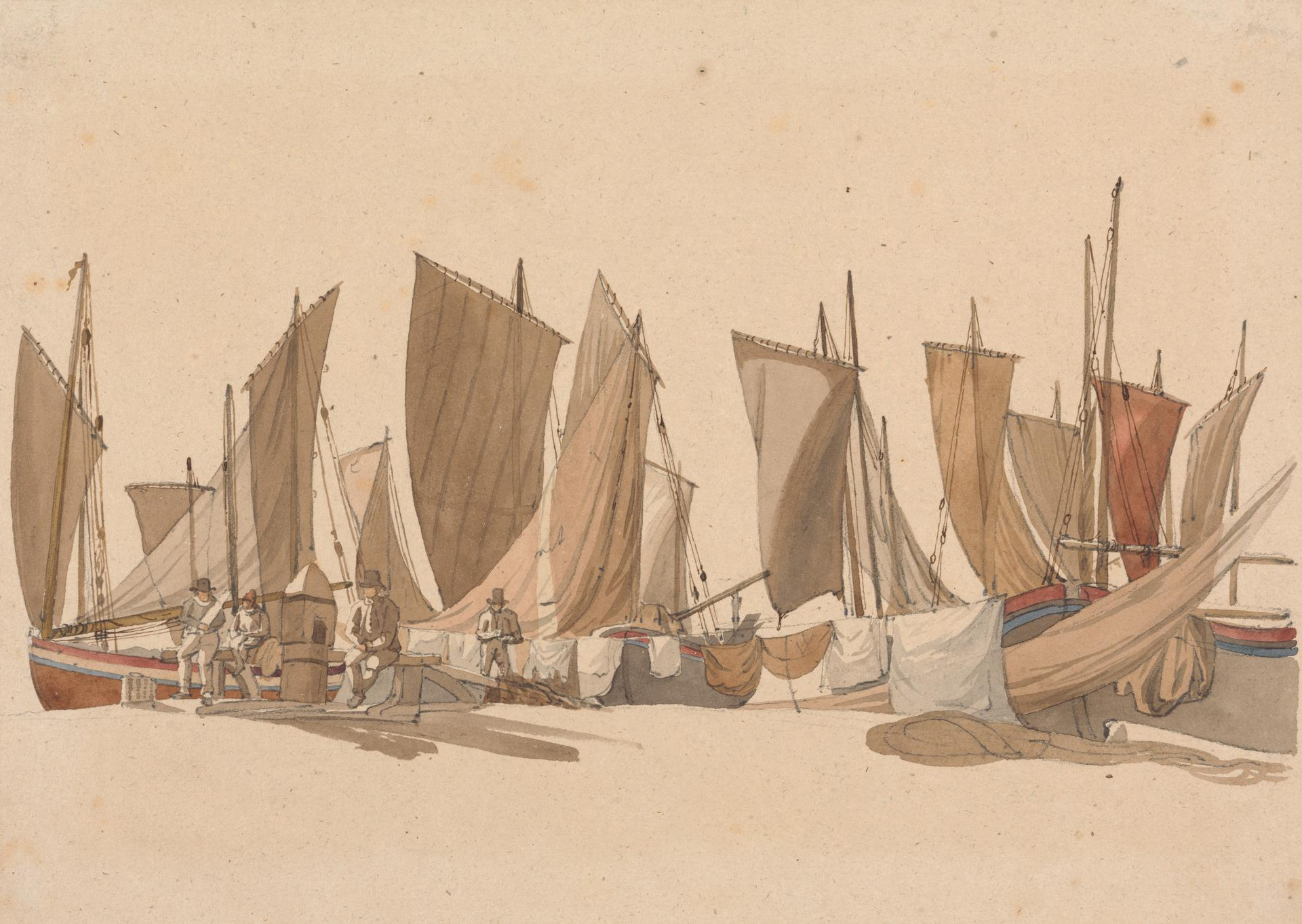
Fishing Smacks

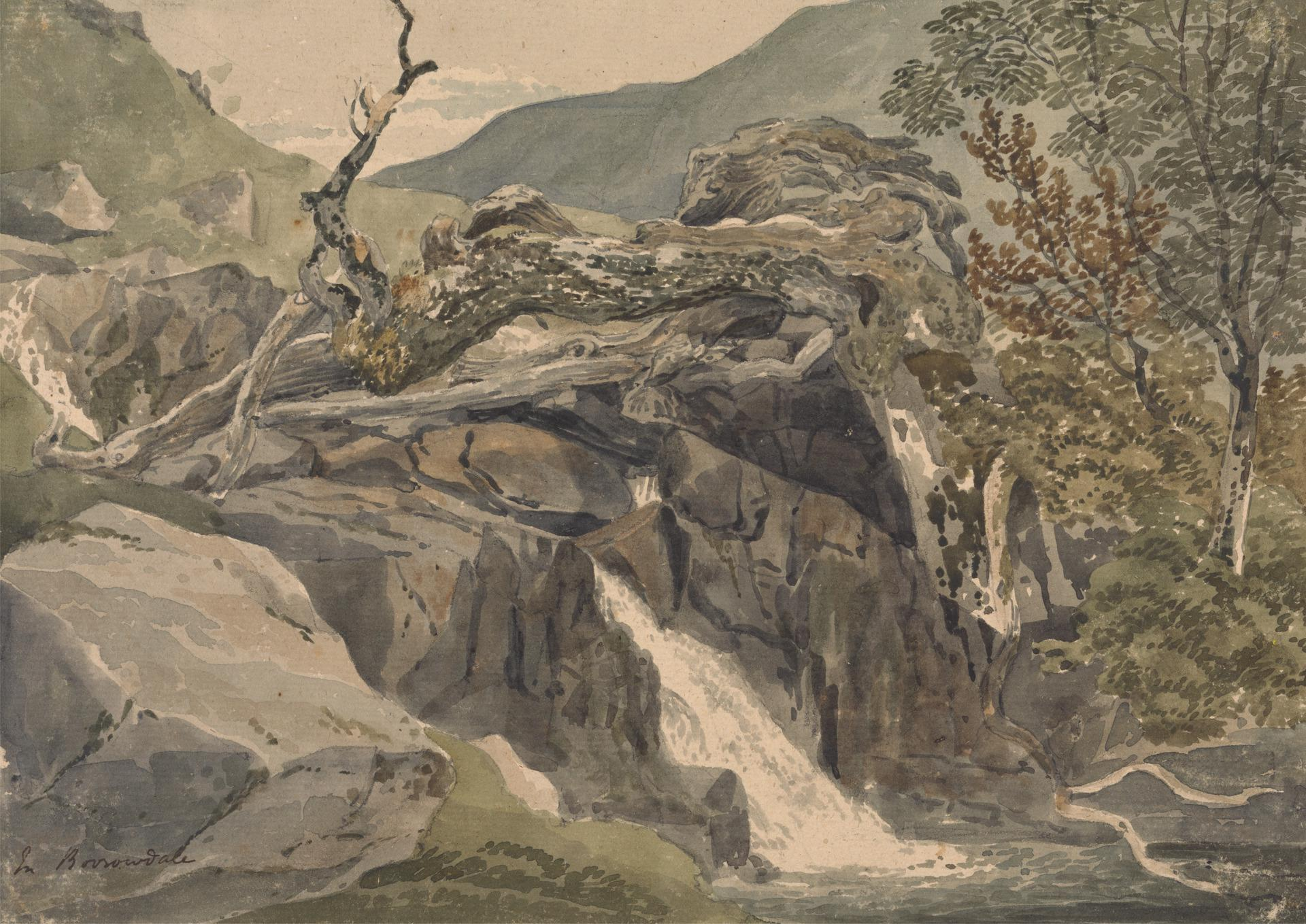
In Borrowdale

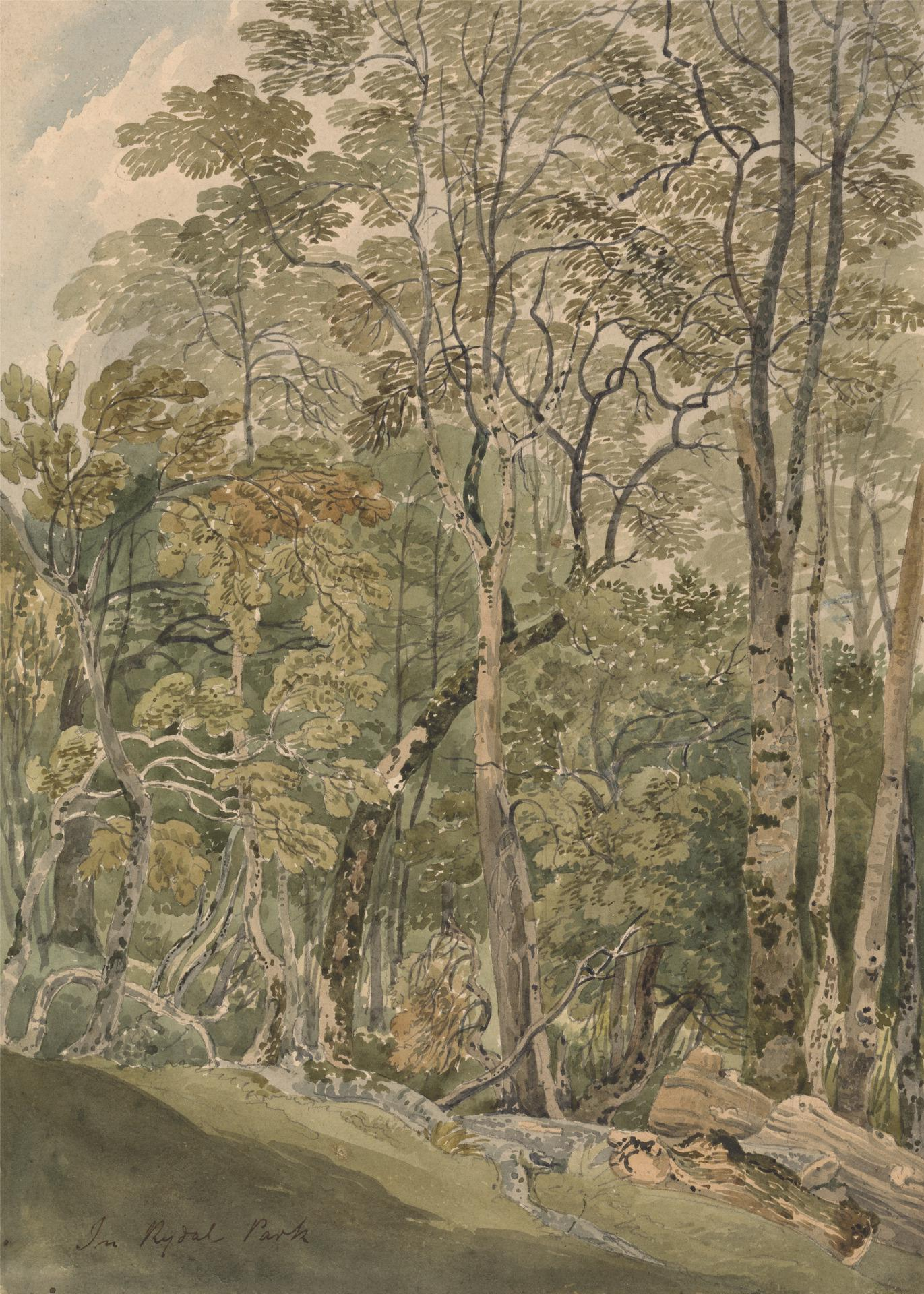
In Rydal Park

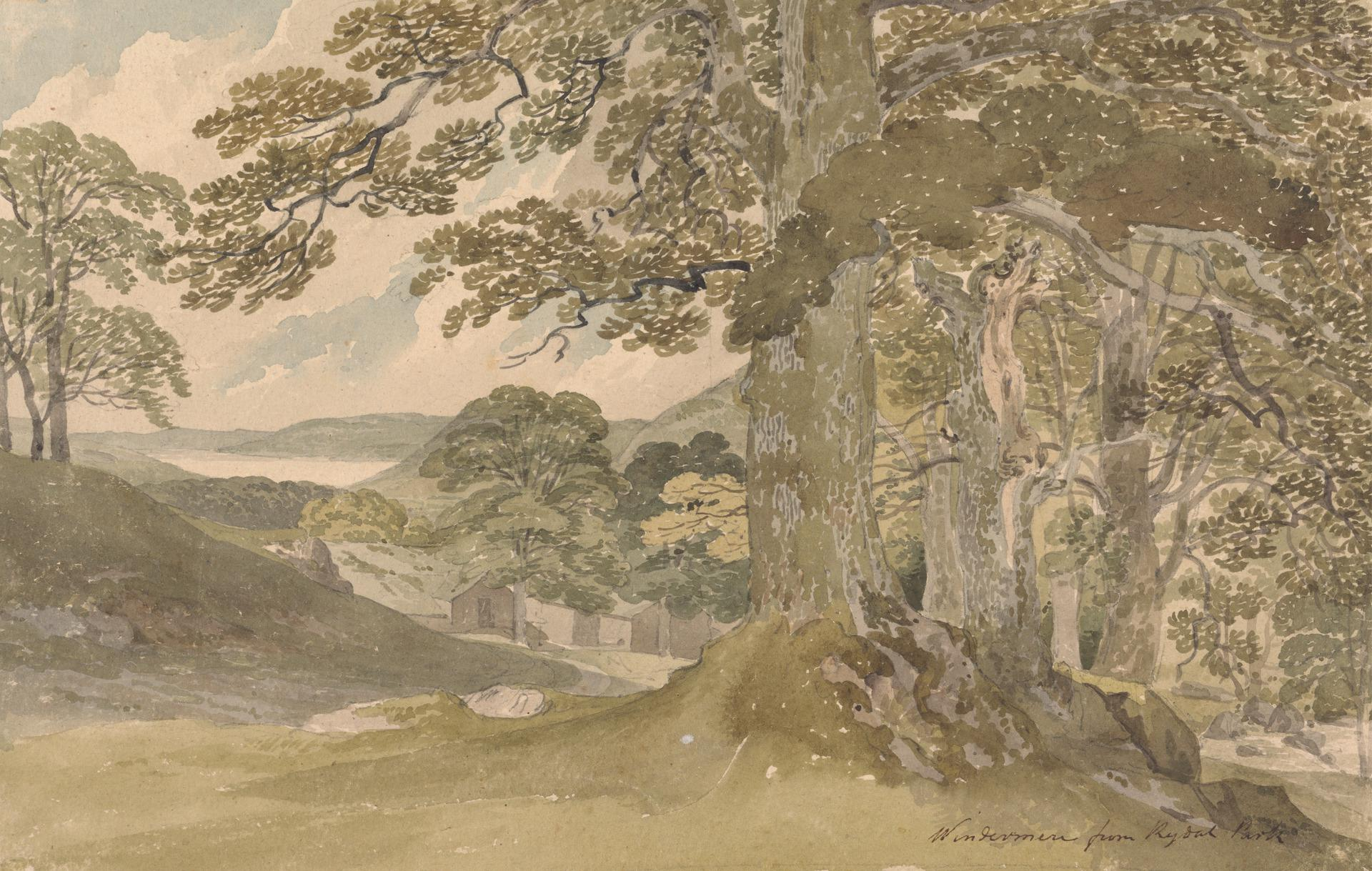
Windermere from Rydal Park

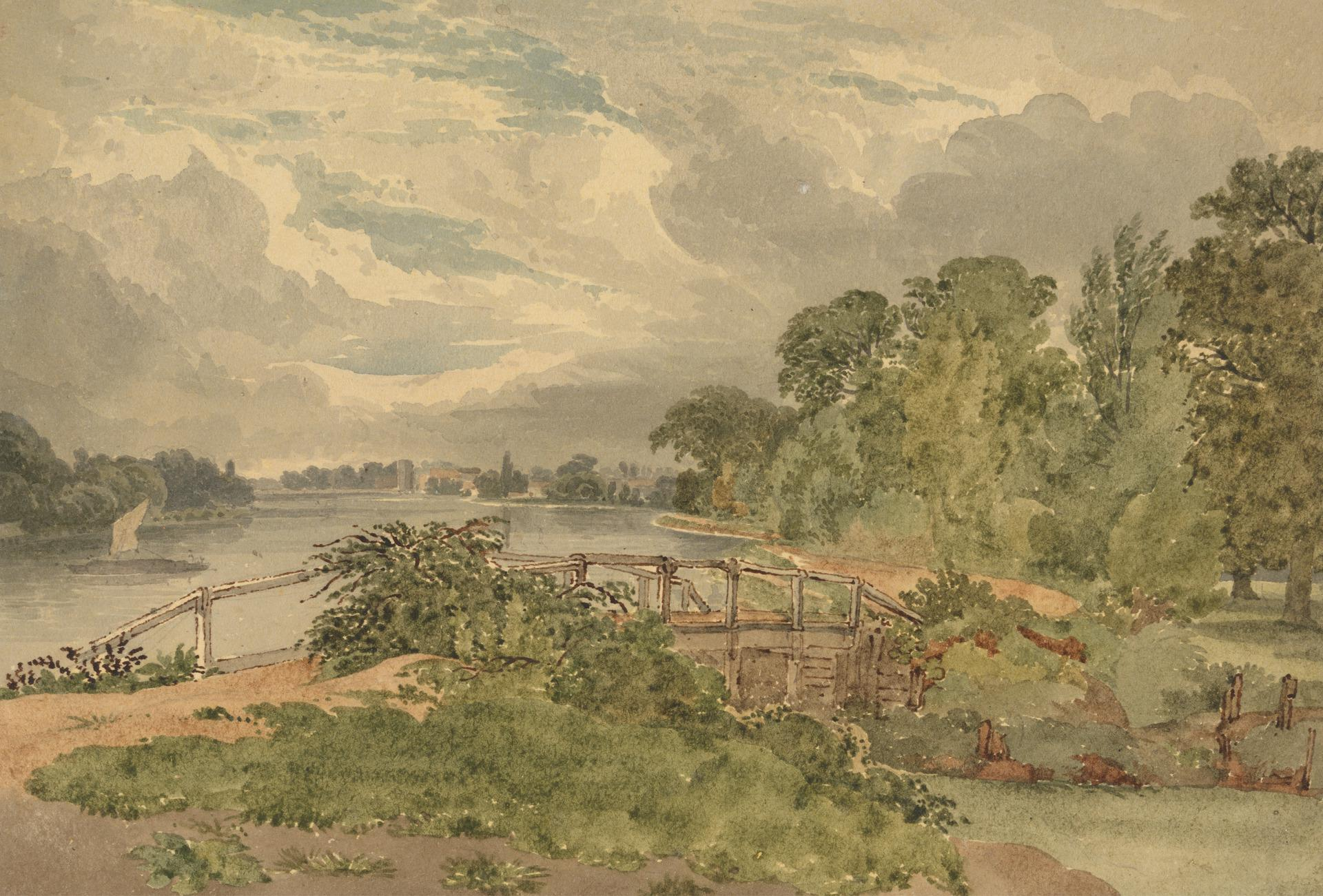
River Landscape with Lock in Foreground

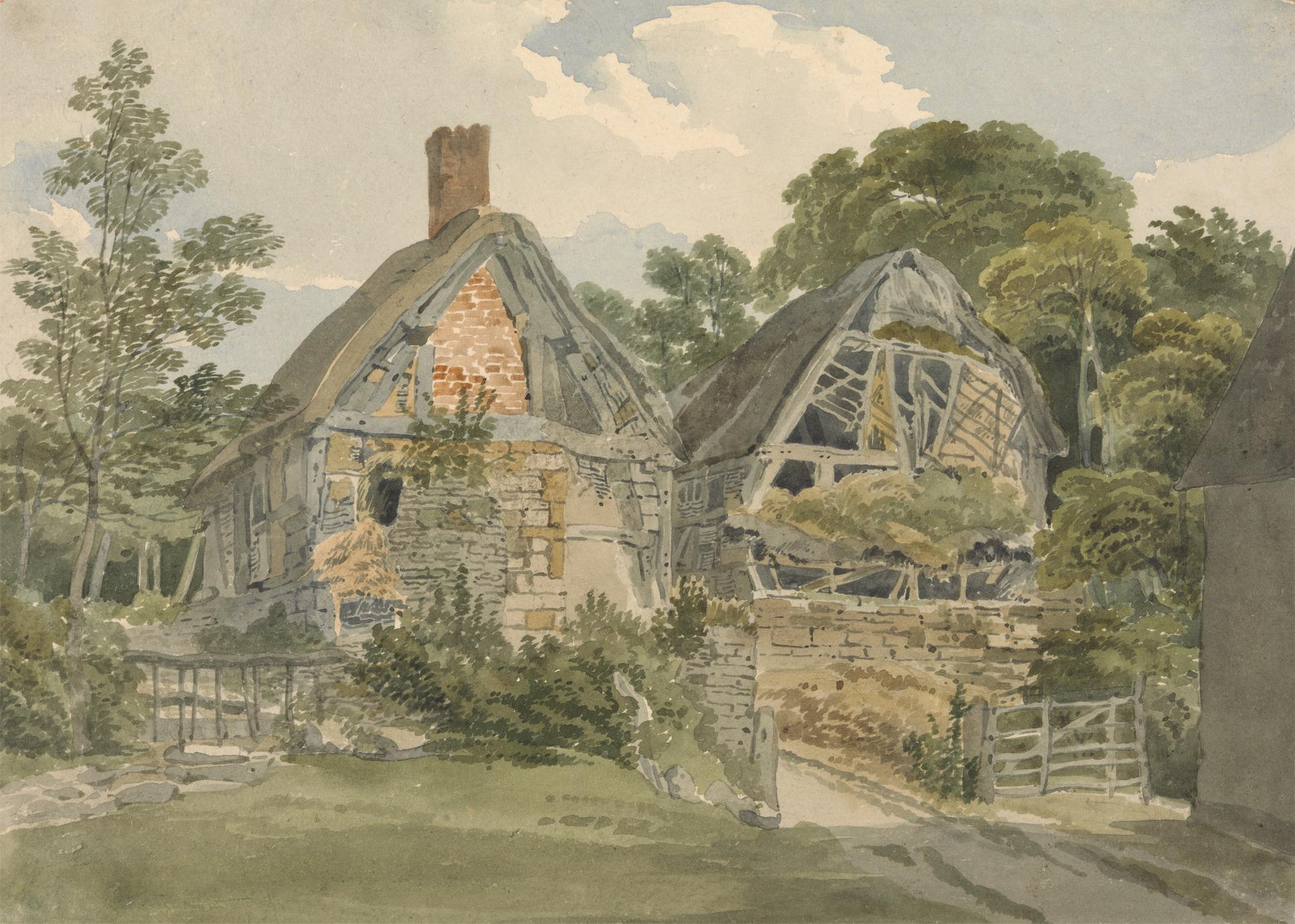
Thatched Cottage and Adjoining Barn

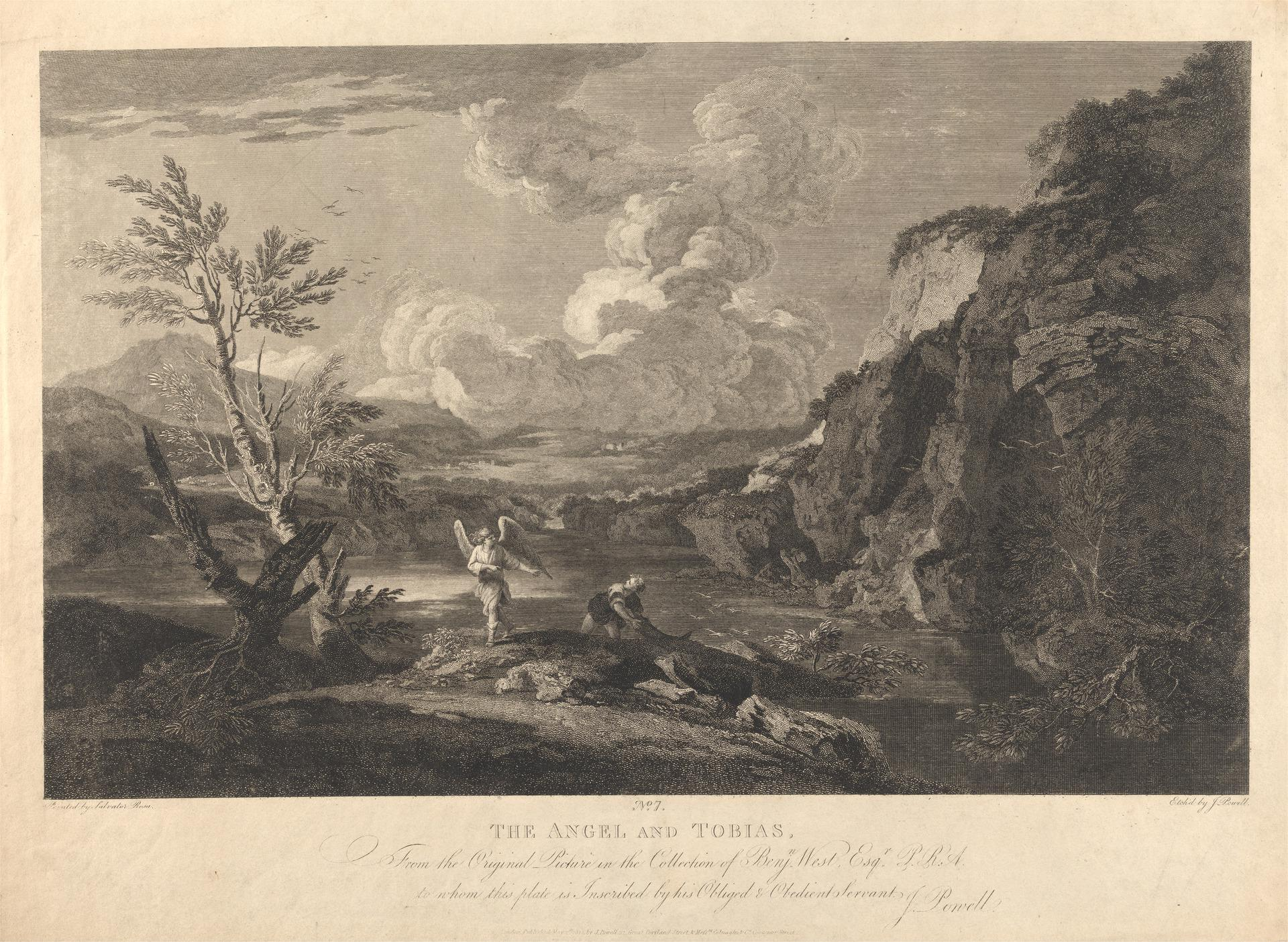
The Angel and Tobias

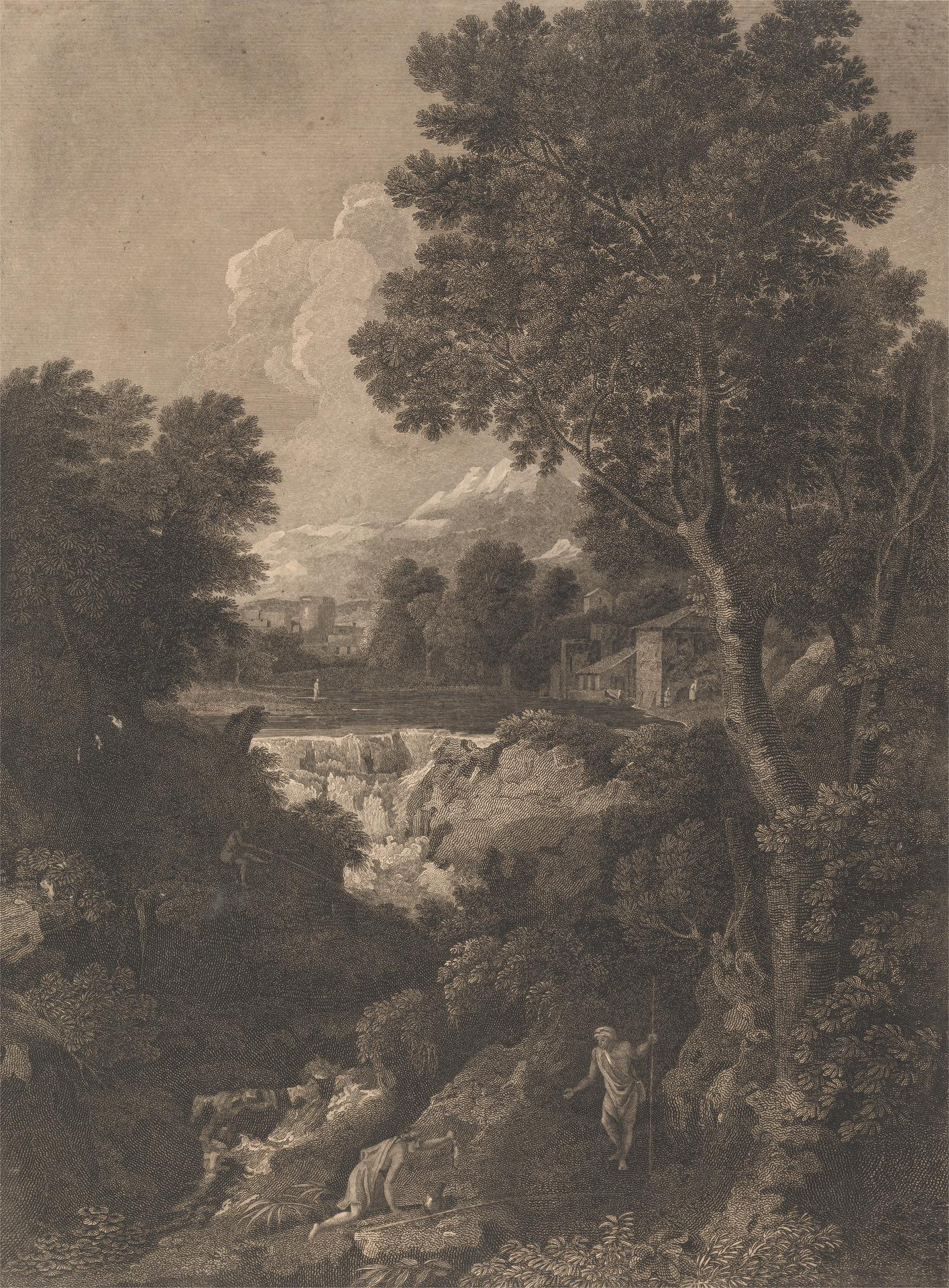
Untitled

== Sources ==
- Mallalieu, Huon (2004). "Powell, Joseph (1780–1834), watercolour painter and printmaker". Oxford Dictionary of National Biography (online ed.). Oxford University Press. doi:10.1093/ref:odnb/22654. (Subscription, Wikipedia Library access or UK public library membership required.)

Attribution:

- This article incorporates text from a publication now in the public domain: Cust, Lionel Henry (1896). "Powell, John (fl.1796-1829)". In Lee, Sidney (ed.). Dictionary of National Biography. Vol. 46. London: Smith, Elder & Co. p. 245.
