= Joseph Farington =

English painter and diarist (1747–1821)

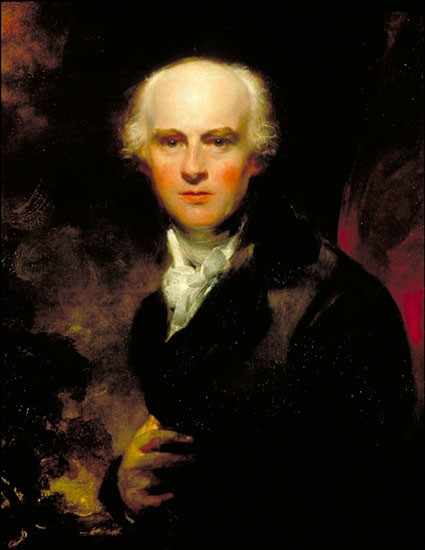
Joseph Farington (1794–95) by Thomas Lawrence

Joseph Farington RA (21 November 1747 – 30 December 1821) was an 18th-century English landscape painter and diarist.

== Family ==
Born in Leigh, Lancashire, Farington was the second of seven sons of William Farington and Esther Gilbody. His father was the rector of Warrington and vicar of Leigh. Three of his brothers—William, Henry, and Richard—were "employed in the naval service of the East India Company". Edward died of yellow fever when he was 32. Robert attended Brasenose College and became vicar of St George in the East, London (whose advowson was held by Brasenose). George Farington became a painter, like Joseph himself.

== Association with the Royal Academy and its exhibitions ==
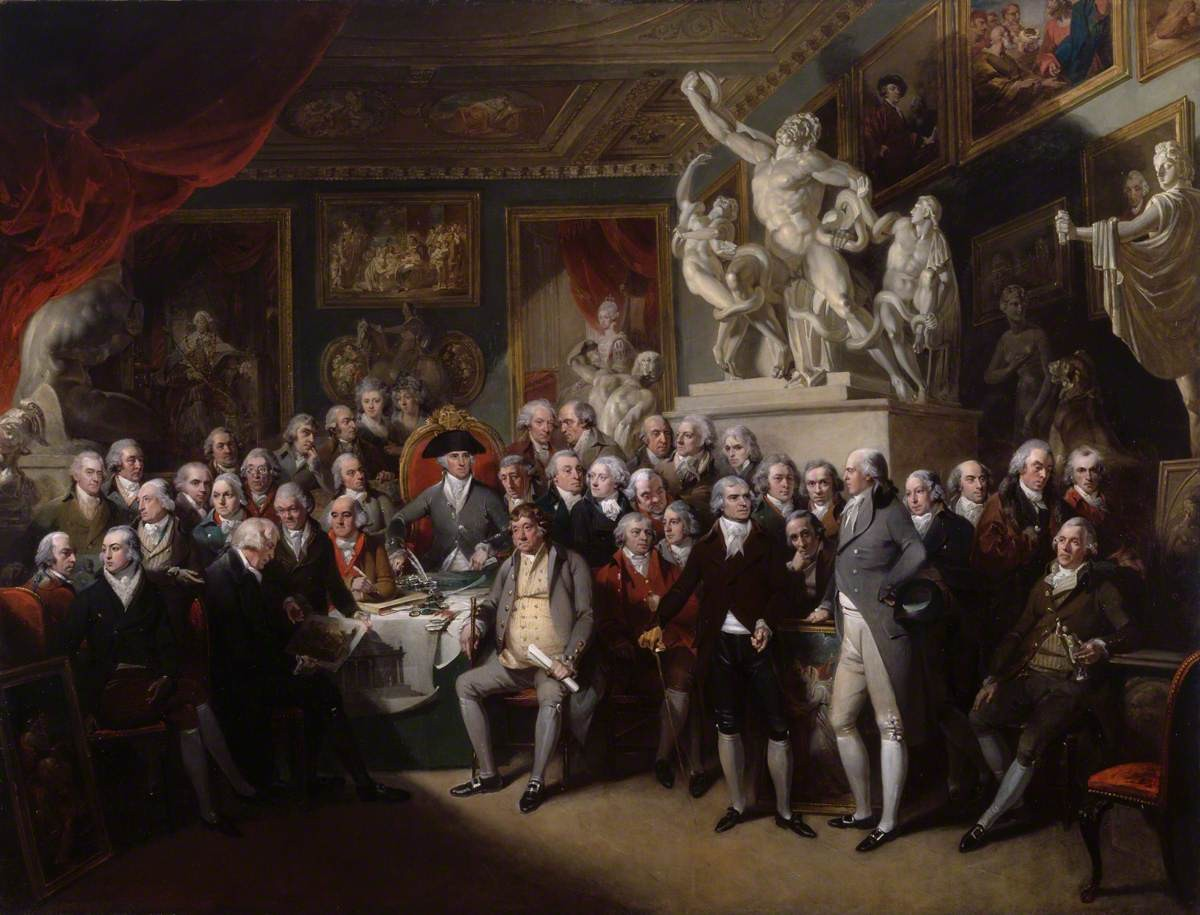
The Royal Academicians in General Assembly by Henry Singleton, 1795

After his early education in Maryland, Farington went to study with Richard Wilson in London in 1763. In 1764, 1765, and 1766 he won "premiums" from the Society of Artists for his landscape drawing; he became a member in 1765. He joined the Royal Academy when it was founded in 1769 and was elected an ARA in 1783 and an RA in 1785. Farington contributed works to the Academy's exhibitions every year until 1801, but only occasionally between 1801 and 1813. In 1802, two students attending the Royal Academy Schools, John Constable and Samuel Lane, came under his tutelage and remained close friends whom he championed at the Royal Academy for the rest of his life. He was an active member of the Academy and sat on several important committees, including the one which determined where artworks would be hung during the exhibitions. He also acted as executor for the estate of fellow Academician, John Webber. In 1793 he became a fellow of the Society of Antiquaries and helped establish the British Institution. He assisted in the Thomas Gainsborough, William Hogarth, and Richard Wilson exhibitions in 1806.

Farington resided for a time in the Lake District and between 1776 and 1780 he made numerous drawings of the landscapes of the region and maintained a list describing what he believed should be their intended order. He took two trips in Europe, one to the Netherlands in 1793 "to prepare illustrations for an official record of the siege of Valenciennes". During the Peace of Amiens in 1802, he travelled to Paris with the artists Benjamin West, John Hoppner, and Johann Fuseli, among others. There he saw antique sculpture and Italian art; he also visited the studios of Jacques-Louis David and François Gérard. After returning from this trip, he painted less and less.

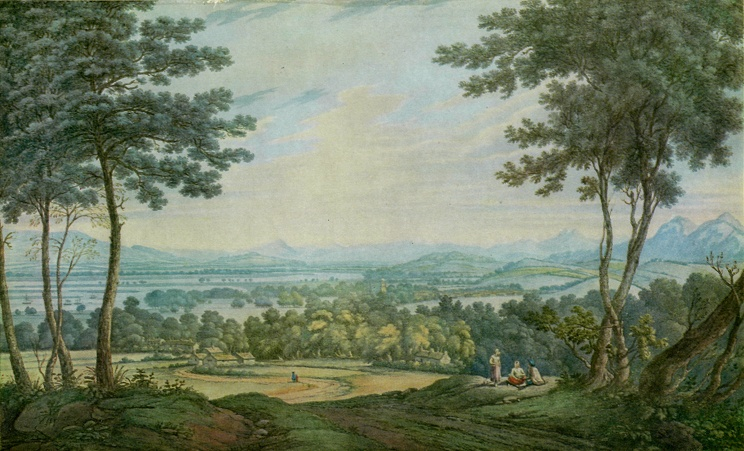
Scotch Landscape by Farington

According to Evelyn Newby's biographical article in the Oxford Dictionary of National Biography, "[i]t is difficult to make a real appraisal of his paintings as they are scattered in many private and public collections, and rarely appear in art sales." However, she writes that "Farington's real forte lay in the careful, accurate topographical drawings which he prepared for the folios of engravings of British views which found a ready market among tourists confined to Britain by unrest abroad."

== Published works ==
In 1785, he published Views of the Lakes of Cumberland and Westmorland and in 1794 he published a two-volume History of the River Thames with 76 aquatints. In the early 19th century, he participated in Cadell and Davies modernisation of the illustrated atlas Britannia depicta, which ran to six volumes of the projected whole; to it he contributed topographical Views in Cornwall (1814) and other views; for the unpublished seventh volume, depicting Devon, Farington's drawings were engraved but never published, and William Byrne's Magna Britannia., a project that became so costly that it was never completed. Farington edited the Memoirs of Sir Joshua Reynolds, in six volumes, 1819.

== Marriage ==
Farington and Susan Mary Hamond, a relative of the Walpole family, married on 19 March 1776; the couple had no children, but Farington was always interested in the lives of his brothers' children throughout his life. When his wife died in 1800, Farington collapsed and could neither draw nor paint. His family and friends, such as the painter Robert Smirke and his family, helped Farington recover.

== Diary ==
Farington kept a daily diary from 13 July 1793 until his death, missing only a few days. This diary has proved invaluable to historians, particularly its references to the London art world. As Newby explains, "[w]ith its emphasis on biography and anecdote it is an invaluable source of information on artists of the period and of the internal workings of the Royal Academy."

Farington knew the new industrialists in the Midlands, he understood the internal workings of the East India Company, his wife's family gave him access to information on government policy, he attended the major political trials of the day, such as Warren Hastings's failed impeachment, and he followed William Wilberforce's anti-slavery campaign.

The diary eventually constituted 16 volumes which were kept as a family heirloom until they were auctioned off in 1921 to the Morning Post. They were first published serially and then edited by James Greig and published in book form between 1922 and 1928. Another 16-volume edition was issued between 1978 and 1984.

== Accidental death ==
At Christmas 1821 Farington stayed with his brother Richard, at the latter's Parrs Wood House in Manchester. While attending a New Year's Eve service at St James' Church Didsbury, Farrington fell down the steps of the church and died shortly thereafter.

== Gallery ==
Old Ouse Bridge, York, 1784
