= Cadell & Davies =

Defunct British publisher

Cadell and Davies, also known as T. Cadell, jun. and W. Davies, was a publishing company established in London in 1793. The business was formed when bookseller and publisher Thomas Cadell the elder (1742–1802) bequeathed his business to his son Thomas Cadell the younger (1773–1836) and the elder Cadell's apprentice William Davies. Cadell & Davies shut down after Davies death in 1819. Cadell continued in business until his own death in 1836.

Cadell & Davies published the 4th to 8th editions of James Boswell's Life of Johnson.

== Work ==
The firm published various portraits from engravings based on earlier drawings made from paintings.

A book by Edward Daniel Clarke was published with engravings by R. Watts of London. It documented travels in various countries of Europe, Asia, and Africa in 1813 and was a follow-up to an earlier book on Russia Tartary and Turkey published in 1810. The second book covered Greece, Egypt, and the Holy Land (1813).

Cadell and Davies published work by Philip James de Loutherbourg in 1816 that was created for Thomas Macklin's folio bible, the Macklin Bible. De Loutherbourg's work for the bible project included vignettes for which de Loutherbourg did apocrypha drawings. Cadell and Davies published the drawings in 1816 after Macklin and De Loutherberg had died.

The firm also published Britannia Depicta, a series of 130 views of "the most interesting and picturesque objects in Bedfordshire, Berkshire, Buckinghamshire, Cambridgeshire, Cheshire, Cornwall, Cumberland, & Derbyshire". It included the work of many engravers who worked from artist's drawings. Descriptions in the book were written by Samuel Lysons. The book included Joseph Farington's work, such as General View from Matlock High Tor, in Part VI, Derbyshire published May 15, 1817. Britannia Depicta

== Archive ==
The Cadell and Davies papers are held the Cadbury Research Library, University of Birmingham. Yale University also has a collection of the firm's papers and correspondence.
