= List of Irish painters =

This is a list of notable painters from, or associated with, Ireland.

== A ==
- Henry Allan (1865–1912)
- William Ashford (1746–1824)

== B ==
- Francis Bacon (1909–1992)
- Robert Ballagh (born 1943)
- John James Barralet (1747–1815)
- George Barret, Sr. (1730–1784)
- William Gerard Barry (1864–1941)
- Rose Maynard Barton (1856–1929)
- Richard Brydges Beechey (1808–1859)
- Pauline Bewick (born 1935)
- Francis Bindon (c. 1690–1765)
- Brian Bourke (born 1936)
- Gretta Bowen (1880–1981)
- John Boyne (c. 1750–1810)
- Charles Brady (1926–1997)
- Muriel Brandt (1909–1981)
- James Brenan (1837–1907)
- Henry Brocas (1762–1837)
- Louis le Brocquy (1916–2012)
- Henry Brooke (1738–1806)
- Christy Brown (1932–1981)
- Adam Buck (1759–1833)
- Augustus Nicholas Burke (1838–1891)
- Thomas Burke (1749–1815)
- Frederick William Burton (1816–1900)
- Mildred Anne Butler (1858–1941)
- John Butts (died 1764)

== C ==
- George Campbell (1917–1979)
- Niccolo d'Ardia Caracciolo (1941–1989)
- Robert Carver (c. 1730–1791)
- John Cassidy (1860–1939)
- Egerton Coghill (1853–1921)
- Charles Collins (c. 1680–1744)
- Patrick Collins (1911–1994)
- John Comerford (1773–1832)
- Barrie Cooke (1931–2014)
- Nigel Cox (born 1959)
- James Humbert Craig (1877–1944)
- Martin Cregan (1788–1870)
- Robert Crone (c. 1740–1779)
- Nicholas Joseph Crowley (1819–1857)
- William Crozier (1930–2011)
- William Cuming (1769–1852)
- Amelia Curran (1775–1847)

== D ==
- Elinor Darwin (1871–1954)
- Gerald Davis (1938–2005)
- William Davis (1812–1873)
- Kate Dobbin (1868–c. 1948)
- Andrew Hastings Doyle (c. 1774–1841)
- Henry Edward Doyle (1827–1893)
- John Doyle (1797–1868)
- Susanna Drury (c. 1698–c. 1770)
- Patrick Vincent Duffy (1832–1909)
- Ronald Ossory Dunlop (1894–1973)
- George Victor Du Noyer (1817–1869)
- Edward Plunkett, 20th Baron of Dunsany (1939–2011)

== E ==
- Felim Egan (1952–2020)
- Alfred Elmore (1815–1881)
- Beatrice Elvery (1881–1970)
- Jacob Ennis (1728–1770)
- Charles Exshaw (died 1771)

== F ==
- Gary Farrelly (born 1983)
- Fergus Feehily (born 1968)
- Sean Fingleton (born 1950)
- Jonathan Fisher (c. 1740–1809)
- Jim Fitzpatrick
- Bridget Flannery (born 1959)
- Stanhope Forbes (1857–1947)
- Samuel Forde (1805–1828)
- Thomas Foster (1798–1826)
- Hugh Frazer (1795–1865)
- Percy French (1854–1920)
- Thomas Frye (1710–1762)

== G ==
- Gaspare Gabrielli (1770–1828)
- Norman Garstin (1847–1926)
- Edmund Garvey (1740–1813)
- Robert Gibbings (1889–1958)
- Grace Gifford (1888–1955)
- William St. John Glenn (1904–1974)
- Robert Charles Goff (1837–1922)
- William Crampton Gore (1871–1946)
- Reginald Gray (1930–2013)
- Nathaniel Grogan (1740–1807)
- Beatrice Gubbins (1878–1944)

== H ==
- Gustavus Hamilton (1739–1775)
- Hugh Douglas Hamilton (c. 1740–1808)
- Letitia Marion Hamilton (1878–1964)
- James Hanley (born 1965)
- Alice Hanratty (born 1939)
- Sarah Cecilia Harrison (1863–1941)
- Henry Albert Hartland (1840–1893)
- Edwin Hayes (1819–1904)
- Joseph Patrick Haverty (1794–1864)
- Patrick Hennessy (1915–1980)
- William John Hennessy (1839–1917)
- Mary Balfour Herbert (1817–1893)
- Paul Henry (1877–1958)
- Patrick Hickey (1927–1998)
- Thomas Hickey (1741–1824)
- Nathaniel Hill (1861–1934)
- Evie Hone (1894–1955)
- Nathaniel Hone the Elder (1718–1784)
- Nathaniel Hone the Younger (1831–1917)
- Thomas Hovenden (1840–1895)
- Hugh Howard (1675–1737)
- Robert Hunter (fl. 1748–1780)
- Philip Hussey (died 1783)

== I ==
- Charles C. Ingham (c. 1796–1863)

== J ==
- Mainie Jellett (1897–1944)
- Charles Jervas (c. 1675–1739)
- James Le Jeune (1910–1983)
- George W. Joy (1844–1925)

== K ==
- Paul Kane (1810–1871)
- Joseph Malachy Kavanagh (1856–1918)
- Seán Keating (1889–1977)
- Frances Kelly (1908–2002)
- Phil Kelly (1850–2010)
- Harry Kernoff (1900–1974)
- Cecil King (1921–1986)
- John Kingerlee (born 1936)
- William Burke Kirwan (1814–1880?)

== L ==
- James Latham (c. 1696–1747)
- John Lavery (1856–1941)
- Thomas Lawranson (fl. 1760–1777)
- Edward Daniel Leahy (1797–1875)
- William John Leech (1881–1968)
- Samuel Lover (1797–1868)

== M ==
- Gladys Maccabe (1918–2018)
- Daniel Maclise (1806–1870)
- Henry MacManus (c. 1810–1870)
- Anne Madden (born 1932)
- James Malton (1761–1803)
- Padraig Marrinan (1906–1975)
- Fergus Martin (born 1955)
- Charles McAuley (1910–1999)
- Sheila McClean
- Samuel McCloy (1831–1904)
- Niall McCormack (born 1960)
- Siobhan McDonald
- Norah McGuinness (1901–1980)
- Edward McGuire (1932–1986)
- Frank McKelvey (1895–1974)
- Nick Miller (born 1962)
- Flora Mitchell (1890–1973)
- Jack Morrow (1872–1926)
- Richard Moynan (1856–1906)
- Michael Mulcahy (born 1952)
- George Mullins (fl. 1763–1765)
- William Mulready (1786–1863)
- Bernard Mulrenin (1803–1868)
- George Francis Mulvany (1809–1869)
- Garret Murphy (c. 1650–1716)

== N ==
- Andrew Nicholl (1804–1886)
- Charles Wynne Nicholls (1831–1903)
- Evin Nolan (1930–2016)

== O ==
- Dermod O'Brien (1865–1945)
- Diarmuid O'Ceallacháin (1915–1993)
- James Arthur O'Connor (1792–1841)
- John O'Connor (1830–1889)
- Roderic O'Conor (1860–1940)
- Mick O'Dea (born 1958)
- John O'Keeffe (c. 1797–1838)
- Aloysius O'Kelly (1853–1936)
- Tony O'Malley (1913–2003)
- Frank O'Meara (1853–1888)
- Daniel O'Neill (1920–1974)
- George Bernard O'Neill (1828–1917)
- William Orpen (1878–1931)
- Walter Osborne (1859–1903)
- Seán O'Sullivan (1906–1964)

== P ==
- James Pearson (died 1837)
- Stanley Pettigrew (born 1927)
- George Petrie (1790–1866)
- Alexander Pope (1763–1835)
- Sarah Purser (1848–1943)

== R ==
- John Ramage (1748–1802)
- Nano Reid (1900–1981)
- Anne Rigney (born 1957)
- Thomas Roberts (1748–1778)
- Markey Robinson (1918–1999)
- Sampson Towgood Roch (1757–1847)
- Richard Rothwell (1800–1868)
- Thomas Charles Leeson Rowbotham (1823–1875)
- George William Russell (1867–1935)
- John Ryan (1925–1992)

== S ==
- William Sadler (c. 1782–1839)
- Robert Richard Scanlan (1801–1876)
- Patrick Scott (1921–2014)
- Sean Scully (born 1945)
- Kevin Sharkey (born 1961)
- Martin Archer Shee (1769–1850)
- James Sleator (1886–1950)
- Hamilton Sloan (born 1945)
- Stephen Catterson Smith (1806–1872)
- Brian Smyth (born 1967)
- Estella Solomons (1882–1968)
- Edith Somerville (1858–1949)
- Camille Souter (born 1929)
- Edyth Starkie (1867–1941)
- Stella Steyn (1907–1987)
- Patrick Swift (1927–1983)

== T ==
- Henry Jones Thaddeus (1859–1929)
- Sydney Mary Thompson (1847–1923)
- Phoebe Anna Traquair (1852–1936)
- Cesca Chenevix Trench (1881–1918)
- Henry Tresham (c. 1751–1814)
- Patrick Tuohy (1894–1930)

== W ==
- Francis S. Walker (1848–1916)
- Thomas Bond Walker (1861–1933)
- Owen Walsh (1933–2002)
- Robert West (died 1770)
- Leo Whelan (1892–1956)
- Maurice Canning Wilks (1910–1984)
- Alexander Williams (1846–1930)
- W. G. Wills (1828–1891)
- Patrick Wybrant (1816–1894)
- Gladys Wynne (1876–1968)

== Y ==
- Anne Yeats (1919–2001)
- Jack Butler Yeats (1871–1957)
- John Butler Yeats (1839–1922)

== See also ==
- Irish art
- List of Irish artists
- List of Northern Irish artists
