= Feehily =

Feehily is an Irish surname. Notable people with the surname include:

- Fergus Feehily (born 1968), Irish artist
- Mark Feehily (born 1980), Irish singer
- Stella Feehily (born 1969), Irish playwright and actor
