= Patrick Hickey =

Patrick Hickey may refer to:

- Patrick Hickey (artist) (1927–1998), Irish visual artist
- Pat Hickey (ice hockey) (born 1953), Canadian ice hockey player
- Pat Hickey (footballer) (1871–1946), Australian rules footballer
- Pat Hickey (politician) (1882–1930), New Zealand trade unionist
- Patrick Hickey (politician) (born 1950), American politician
- Pat Hickey (sports administrator) (born 1945), Irish IOC member since 1995
- Patrick Hickey (soccer) (born 1998), American soccer player
