= Henry Allan (painter) =

Irish painter (1865–1912)

- Born: 18 June 1865; County Louth, Ireland
- Died: 2 September 1912 (aged 47)
- Known for: Painting

Henry Allan (18 June 1865 – 2 September 1912) was an Irish painter.

He was born at Retreat House, Dundalk, County Louth, Ireland, the youngest son of William and Anne Allan. He studied art in Belfast and Dublin, and continued his art education in Antwerp, alongside contemporary Richard Moynan. He won multiple prizes at the Antwerp Academy as well as the Taylor Prize at the Royal Dublin Society. The style of his work shows the influence of his training in Antwerp with influences from the Hague School.

== Early life and family ==
=== Early life in Ireland ===
Henry Allan was born 18 June 1865 at Retreat House, Dundalk, County Louth. He was the youngest son of William and Anne Allan. William Allan was a distiller in Bachelor’s Walk in Dundalk, while Anne Allan was the daughter of Rev. Solomon Browne, who was a Presbyterian minister in Castledawson in County Londonderry. Allan began his training as an artist in Belfast and Dublin. Between 1882 and 1883, he studied at the Dublin Metropolitan School of Art alongside the artist Roderic O’Conor. O’Conor is considered as one of the best Irish artists and his work is on display across various museums worldwide.

=== Years in Antwerp (1884–1888) ===
At eighteen years of age, in May 1884, Allan enrolled in a summer course at the Académie Royale in Antwerp, Belgium. He was joined by O’Conor and Richard T. Moynan who also studied at the Dublin Metropolitan School of Art; however' he studied there in 1879 prior to Allan. While in Antwerp, Allan shared lodgings with other Irish students such as Moynan and Edwin Hill near the college at no.15 Mutsaerstraat, later moving to no.19. There was a large presence of young Irish artists at the academy in the 1880s, which enabled Allan to work alongside other artists such as Dermod O’Brien. Vincent van Gogh was briefly a student at the Académie Royale between 1885 and early 1886. Van Gogh wrote a letter in English while in Paris in 1886 to English painter H. M. Livens which was incorrectly dated as 1887, and refers to Livens as 'Levens'. In this letter, he asked to be remembered to 'Allan', and the index to The Complete Letters of Vincent van Gogh states 'H. Allan.', likely referring to Henry Allan. Allan returned to Ireland in 1888 as opposed to many of his Irish colleagues in Antwerp who went on to pursue painting in France.

== Career and role in the Royal Hibernian Academy ==
At the Académie, Allan initiated his studies in the antiquity course. He was soon after given the fifth prize for drawing from a figure in May of 1885. Following that, he studied under Karel Verlat in the life class, where in 1887 he came in fourth for a painting based on a model. While many of the Irish artists in Antwerp later settled in France to paint, Allan travelled back to his home country, Ireland, in 1888. Allan was inspired by the work of artists affiliated with the Hague school, like Jozef Israels, as was the case with many Irish students at Antwerp, and this element of nostalgia may be detected in Allan's painting A Dutch interior. He began to display his paintings at the Royal Hibernian Academy in 1889, and kept sending artwork to the Gallery's yearly exhibition until 1912, having a grand total of 113 works displayed. In 1893, his painting Little Matchseller earned him the Albert prize, leading, eventually, to his being elected as an associate member of the Royal Hibernian Academy on the 18 of April 1895. His notably most expensive painting at £250 was exhibited in 1898, called Martial Law - An Episode of the Irish Rebellion in 1798, after which the Royal Hibernian Academy saw The Holy Women and St John with the Body of our Lord, resulting in him becoming a full member of the Royal Hibernian Academy on the 18th January 1901. He went on to serve as treasurer from 1909 to 1911. His works were also displayed at the Cork International Exhibition in 1902 and the Irish International Exhibition in Dublin in 1907, intertwining with his feature in two exhibitions of Irish art in London: The Guildhall exhibition of Irish paintings in 1904, and the Whitechapel exhibition of Irish art in 1913.

== Death and legacy ==
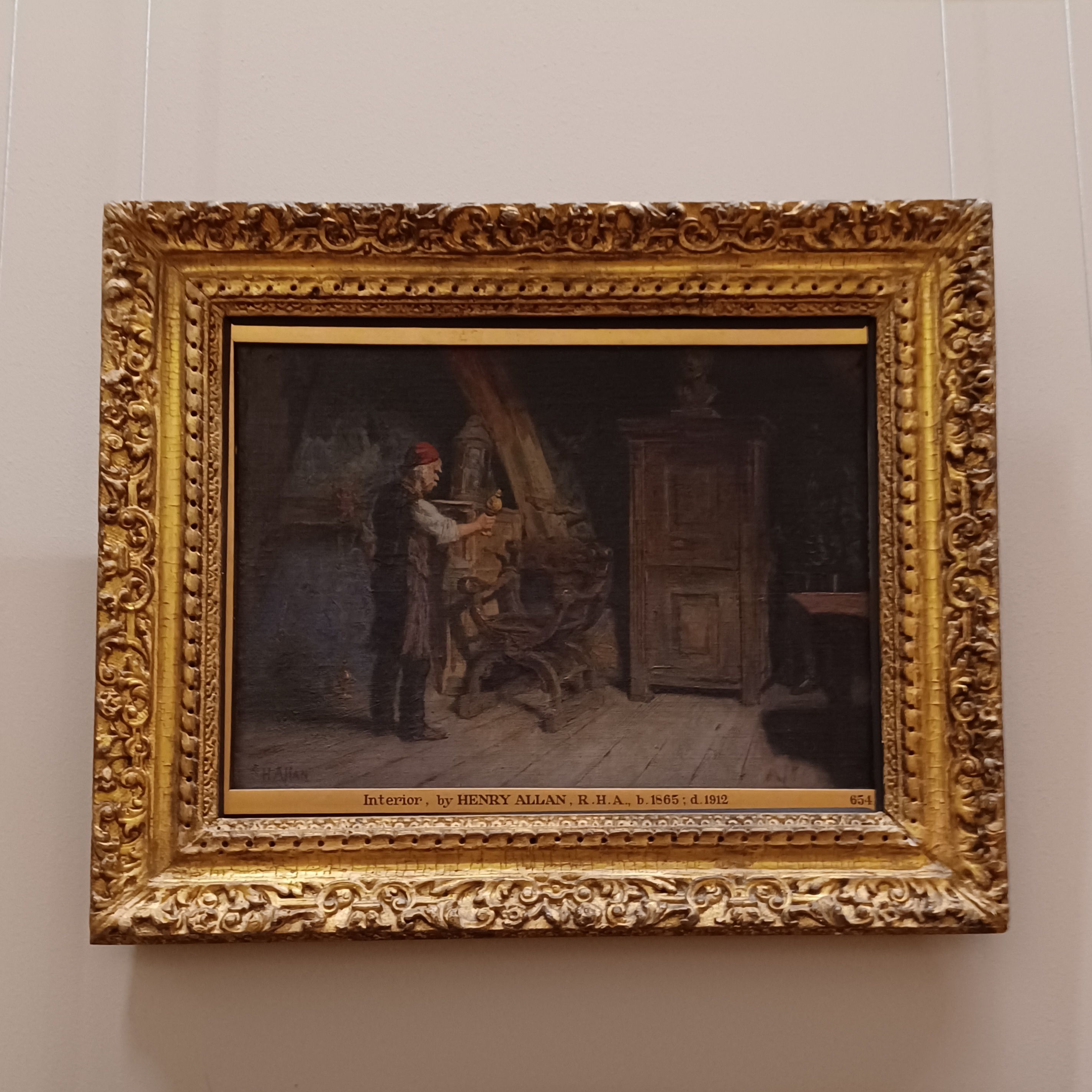
A Dutch Interior hanging in the National Gallery of Ireland, November 2022.

After a prolonged illness, Allan passed away on the 2 September 1912, aged 47, in Rathmines, Dublin and was buried in the Mount Jerome Cemetery, not too far from the Royal Hibernian Academy itself.

Allan's legacy as an artist has been relatively unknown, which can be accredited to the lack of paintings by Allan which can be found today, which may be due to much of his work being destroyed. One painting that is known is called A Dutch Interior (1888), which depicts an old man studying a silver goblet in an antique shop. This painting provides proof of Allan's training at the Académie Royale des Beaux Arts. The second known painting is The Rag Pickers (1884–85) which has been described as a "striking work". It shows two witchlike women wearing black clothes, one of whom is pointing at a group of figures at a beach behind her. He reportedly won a prize for his painting, The Little Match-seller in 1893, however its whereabouts are unknown today.

Other known paintings by Allan include:

- Lagan brook, County Louth (1880)
- "Dawn", Dublin Hills (1904)
- Old Trees, Herbert Park (1907)
- Banna Villa, Ranelagh (n.d.)
- Chickens by a Cottage (n.d.)
- Martial Law - An Episode of the Irish Rebellion in 1798 (n.d.)
- The Holy Women and St John with the Body of our Lord (n.d.)
- Berchem-near Antwerp (n.d.)
- The Rue de Steen, Antwerp (n.d.)
- Mrs Kidney and Maureen (n.d.)
- The Yellow Blouse (n.d.)
- Dublin Ragpickers (n.d.)

A Dutch Interior was donated to the National Gallery of Ireland by Joseph Malachy Kavanagh in 1912 following Allan's death. A Dutch Interior is currently still on display in the National Gallery of Ireland while The Rag Pickers is part of a private collection. The whereabouts of other previously mentioned paintings remain unknown, however they have been likely auctioned off to private collectors or have been destroyed.
