= Irish art =

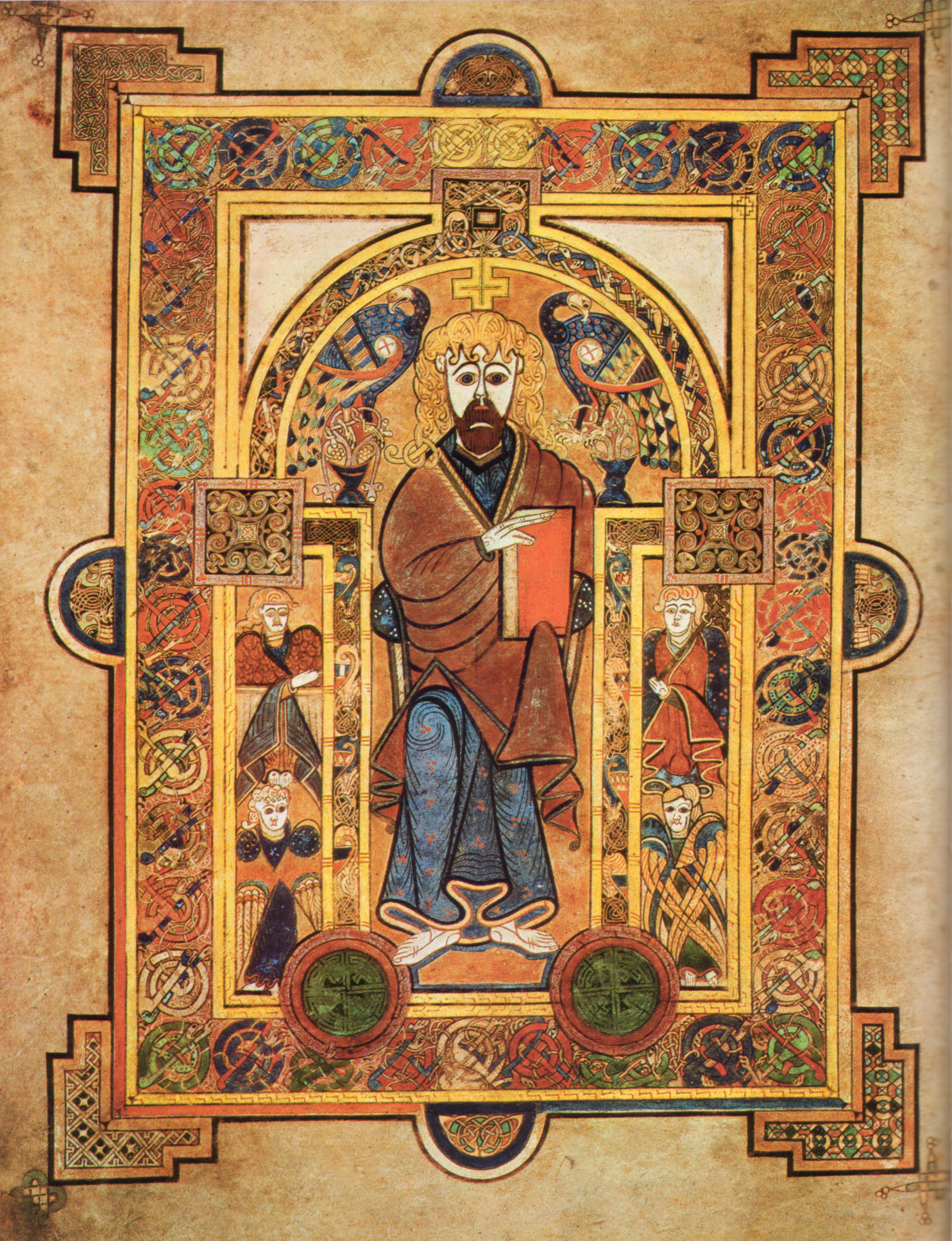
Christ Enthroned from the Book of Kells (9th century)

Irish art is art produced in the island of Ireland, and by artists from Ireland. The term normally includes Irish-born artists as well as expatriates settled in Ireland. Its history starts around 3200 BC with Neolithic stone carvings at the Newgrange megalithic tomb, part of the Brú na Bóinne complex which still stands today, County Meath. In early-Bronze Age Ireland there is evidence of Beaker culture and widespread metalworking. Trade-links with Britain and Northern Europe introduced La Tène culture and Celtic art to Ireland by about 300 BC, but while these styles later changed or disappeared elsewhere under Roman subjugation, Ireland was left alone to develop Celtic designs: notably Celtic crosses, spiral designs, and the intricate interlaced patterns of Celtic knotwork.

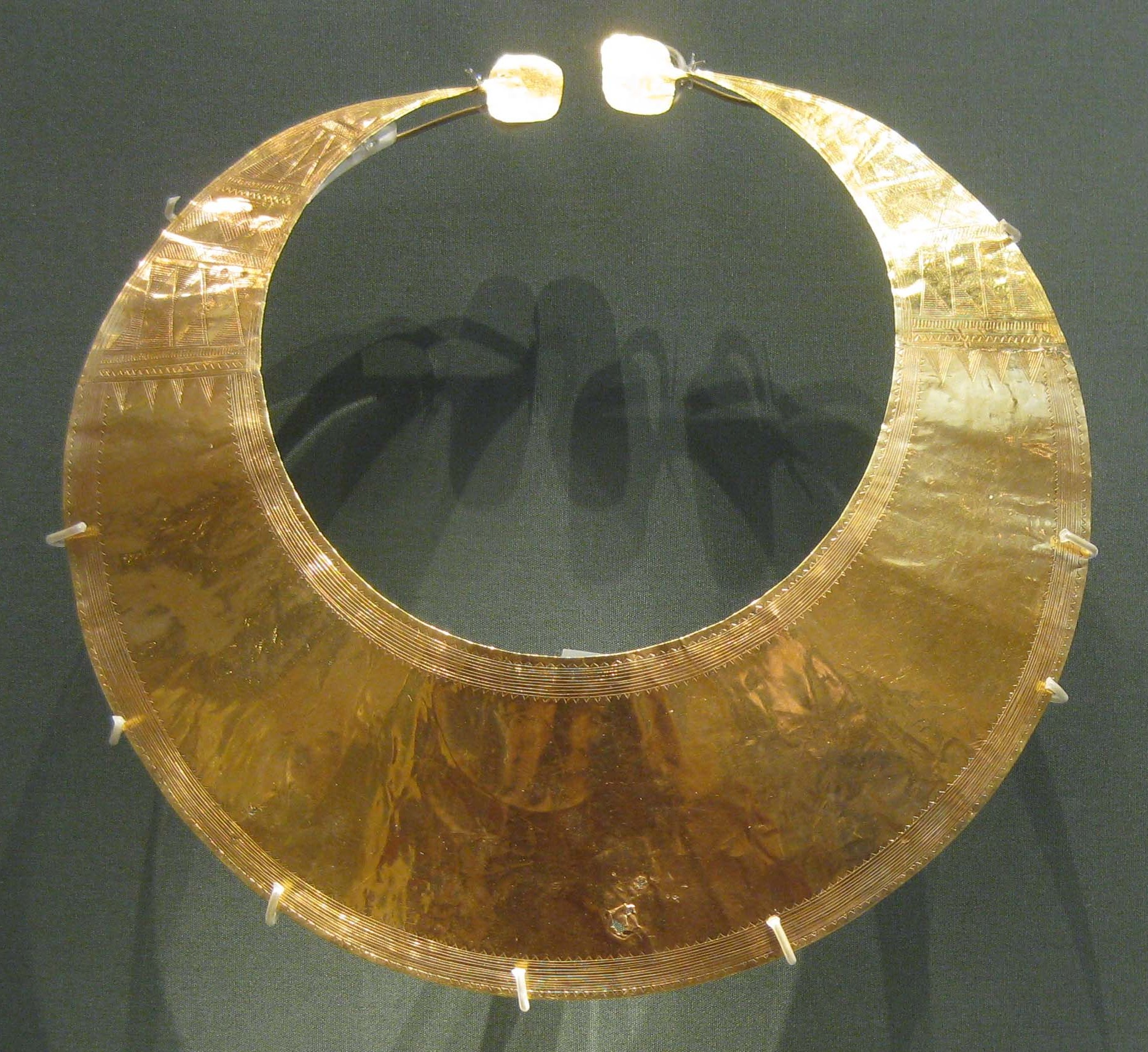
Gold lunula from Blessington, Ireland, Late Neolithic/Early Bronze Age, c. 2400 BC – 2000 BC, Classical group

The Christianization of Ireland in the fifth century AD saw the establishment of monasteries, which acted as centres of scholarship and artistic production, and led to the flowering of the Insular art style with its highly decorative illuminated manuscripts, metalwork and stonework (High crosses). From around 1200 to 1700, however, Irish art was relatively stagnant, and Irish culture was left comparatively untouched by the influence of Renaissance art.

From the late 17th century, artists in the general contemporary styles of European fine art began to emerge, particularly the painting of portraiture and landscapes. The early 18th century saw increased prosperity and establishment of new cultural institutions including the Royal Dublin Society (1731) and Royal Irish Academy (1785). With a small pool of patrons and better opportunities to be found abroad, many Irish artists emigrated, especially to London (portraitists) or Paris (landscapists), which stifled the nascent indigenous scene.

By the start of the 20th century, things began to improve. Opportunities began to spring up at home; the Celtic Revival movement saw a renewed interest in aspects of Celtic culture, Hugh Lane established the Municipal Gallery of Modern Art, the first public gallery of its kind in the world, and with increased patronage a new generation of homegrown talent and returning emigres gradually formed a solid basis for the regrowth of art in Ireland. The foundation of an independent Irish State in the early 1920s did not significantly alter the state of Ireland's visual arts; in the years following Independence, the arts establishment (exemplified by the committee of the Royal Hibernian Academy) was dominated by traditionalists who steadfastly opposed attempts to bring Irish art into line with contemporary European styles.

== Early Irish art ==
=== Up to 200 AD ===
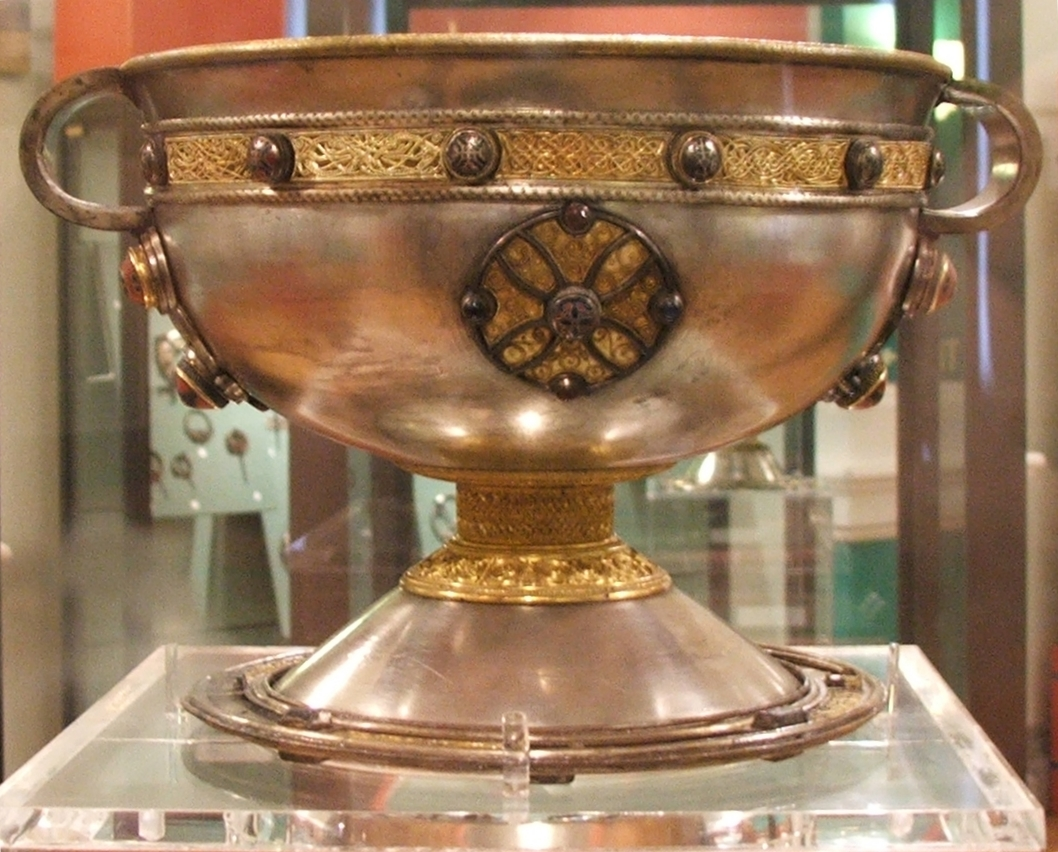
The Ardagh Chalice, c.? 750

Irish gold personal ornaments began to be produced within about 200 years either side of 2000 BC, especially in the thin crescent-shaped gold disks known as lunulae, which were probably first made in Ireland, where over eighty of the around one hundred known examples were found. A range of thin decorated gold discs, bands and plaques, often with pin-holes, were probably attached to clothing, and objects that appear to be earrings have also been found. By around 1400–1000 BC, heavier thin torcs and bangles have been found.

The Late Bronze Age of 900–600 BC saw the peak of the surviving Irish prehistoric goldsmithing, with superbly worked pieces in simple but very sophisticated designs, notably in a type of dress-fastener that looks like a double-ended trumpet curved round so that the two bell mouths are roughly pointing in the same direction. There are also a series of grand gold collars, representing a development of the lunula, with round plates at either end, and a broad corrugated U-shaped body, decorated geometrically along the ridges and troughs of the corrugations. Goldwork all but disappears in the Iron Age, except for the late and enigmatic Broighter Hoard of the 1st century BC, which appears to mix local and Roman pieces.

Although Ireland tends to be strongly associated in the popular mind with Celtic art, the early Continental style of Hallstatt style never reached Ireland, and the succeeding La Tène style reached Ireland very late, perhaps from about 300 BC, and has left relatively few remains, which are often described by art historians together with their British contemporaries as "Insular Celtic". Buried ironwork does not last long in Irish conditions, and gold is very rare, so the survivals are normally in bronze. The Petrie Crown, Loughnashade Trumpet and a series of discs whose function is mysterious are among the most striking pieces. The decoration on a number of bronze scabbards, many found in the River Bann, have inspired much discussion, as they seem close to other pieces from as far away as Hungary, and the possibility of an immigrant master has been raised. The National Museum of Ireland in Dublin holds the majority of major finds from the whole prehistoric period, with others in the Ulster Museum in Belfast and the British Museum in London.

=== 200 to 1150 ===
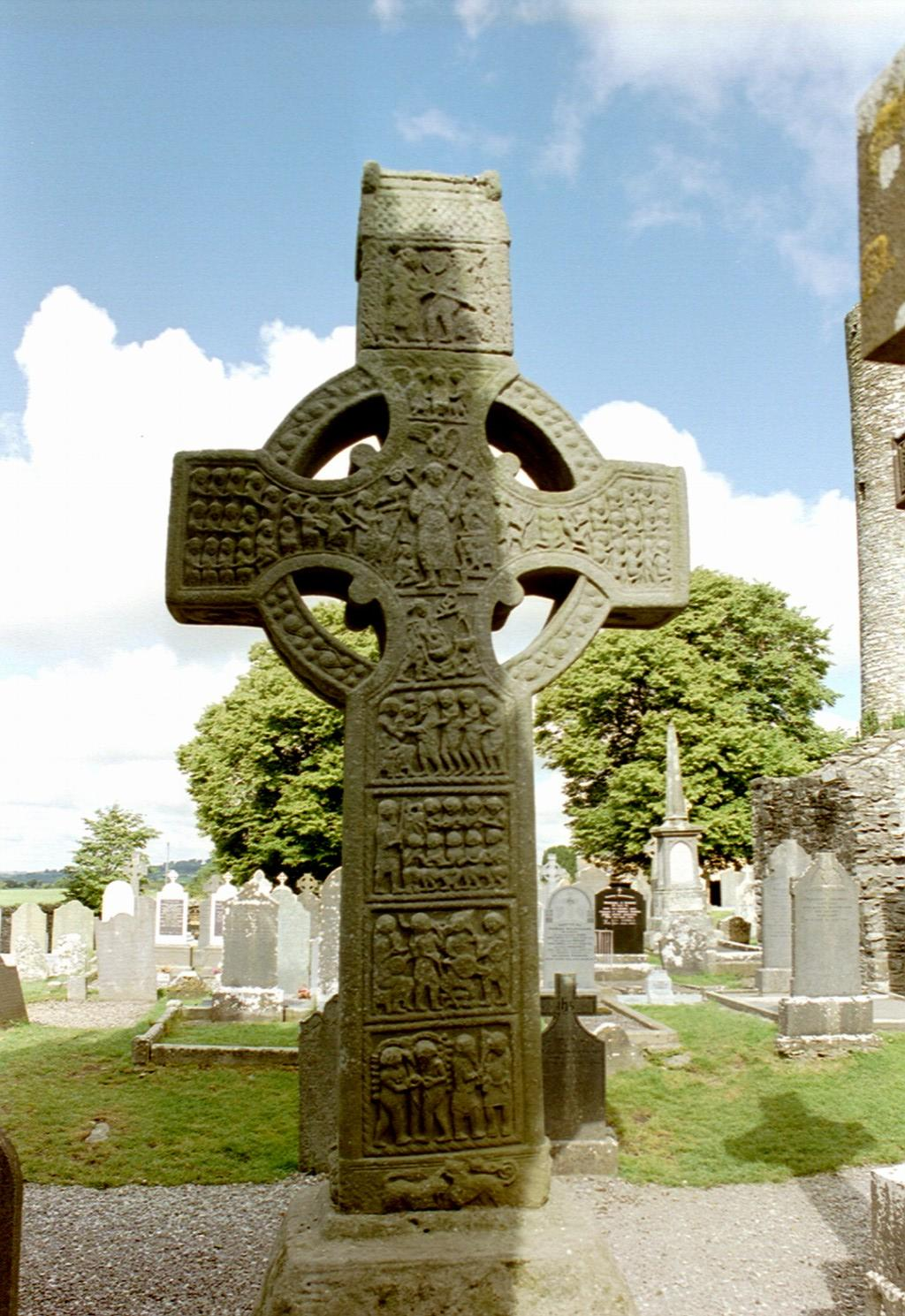
Muiredach's High Cross at Monasterboice, 10th century

Material from Ireland with La Tène style ornament from the third to fifth centuries AD is difficult to demonstrate. In the 6th to 8th centuries the art of the newly Christianised Irish mixed with Mediterranean and Germanic traditions through Irish missionary contacts with the Anglo-Saxons, creating what is called Insular art (or the Hiberno-Saxon style) and the second and best known great period of Irish art. This is exemplified in such masterpieces as the Book of Kells, the Ardagh Chalice and the Tara Brooch, the most spectacular of about fifty elaborate Celtic brooches in precious metal that have been found.

The form of the illuminated manuscript book, new to Ireland, was taken up with enthusiam for luxury books, created in the monasteries, that were kept in the monastery church rather than the library, and were displayed to visitors who would appreciate the decorative styles that were close to those of the personal jewellery of the elite. Most were gospel books, with the most elaborate illumination often restricted to a relatively small number of pages with the evangelist portraits, their symbols, and abstract carpet pages. Narrative images were very few.

The stone high cross, originally painted, was a distinctive insular type of monument, of which many examples survive. Later in the period, Scandinavian influences were added through the Vikings.

=== 1150 to 1550 ===
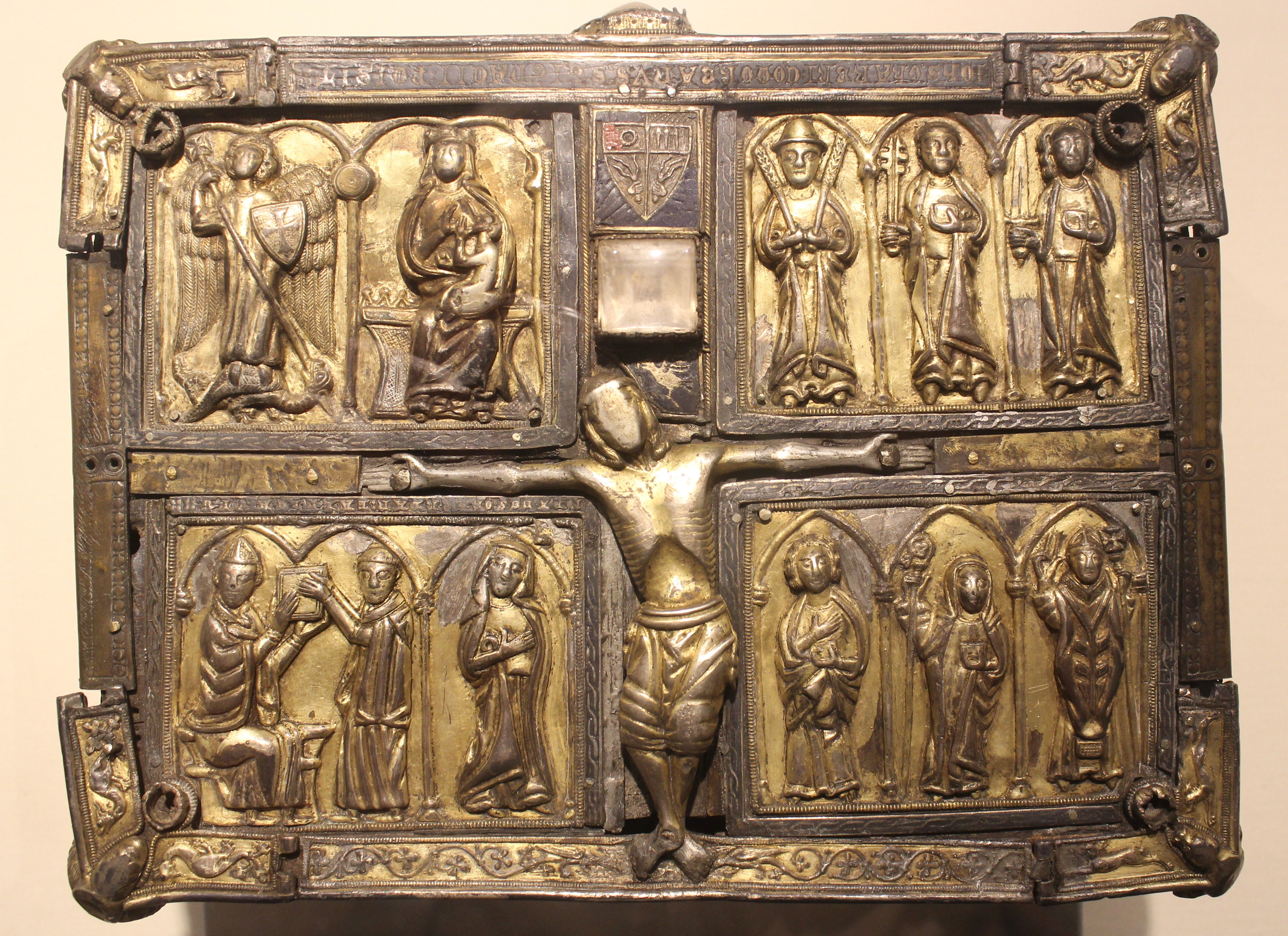
Front of the Domnach Airgid, a late 8–9th century book shrine heavily reworked after 1350

These earlier styles largely came to an end with the Norman invasion of 1169–1170 and the subsequent wide adoption of Romanesque art. Through the Gothic and Renaissance periods Irish art was essentially a regional variation of wider European styles, with many works imported from England or further afield, and some English artists and craftsmen active in Ireland. Many objects of a distinctively Irish form from the first millennium, such as bell or book shrine reliquaries, were renovated or repaired in the contemporary style.

The superlative standard of the best Early Medieval works is not seen, but craftsmen such as metalworkers retained a relatively high social status. Many more signed their work than was usual in other countries in this period, but the rate of losses has been such that there is only a single metalworker whose signature is on two surviving pieces. They seem very often to have been attached to the court of a lord, as were poets.

A number of important literary or historical manuscripts from the period have survived, many now entirely in the Irish language; examples include the Book of Leinster, which is one of several with a text of the Lebor Gabála Érenn or "Book of Invasions". But there are no surviving manuscripts with significant illumination beyond a few decorated initials. In contrast, the period saw a considerable development in the architecture of Ireland with several surviving churches and castles in English-influenced styles.

== 1550 to 1700 ==
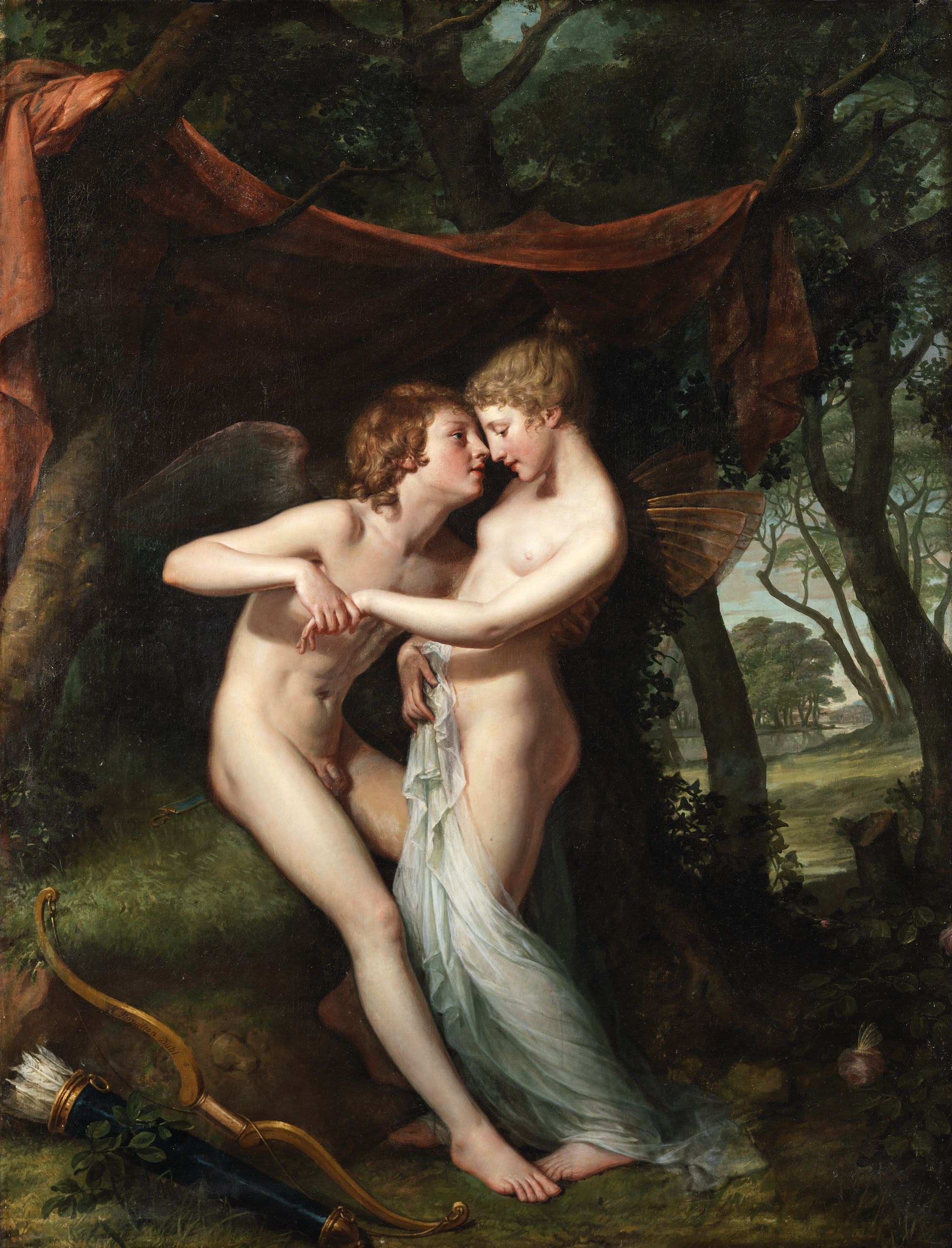
Cupid and Psyche in the nuptial bower by Hugh Douglas Hamilton, who trained in Dublin under Robert West. Oil, 1792–93.

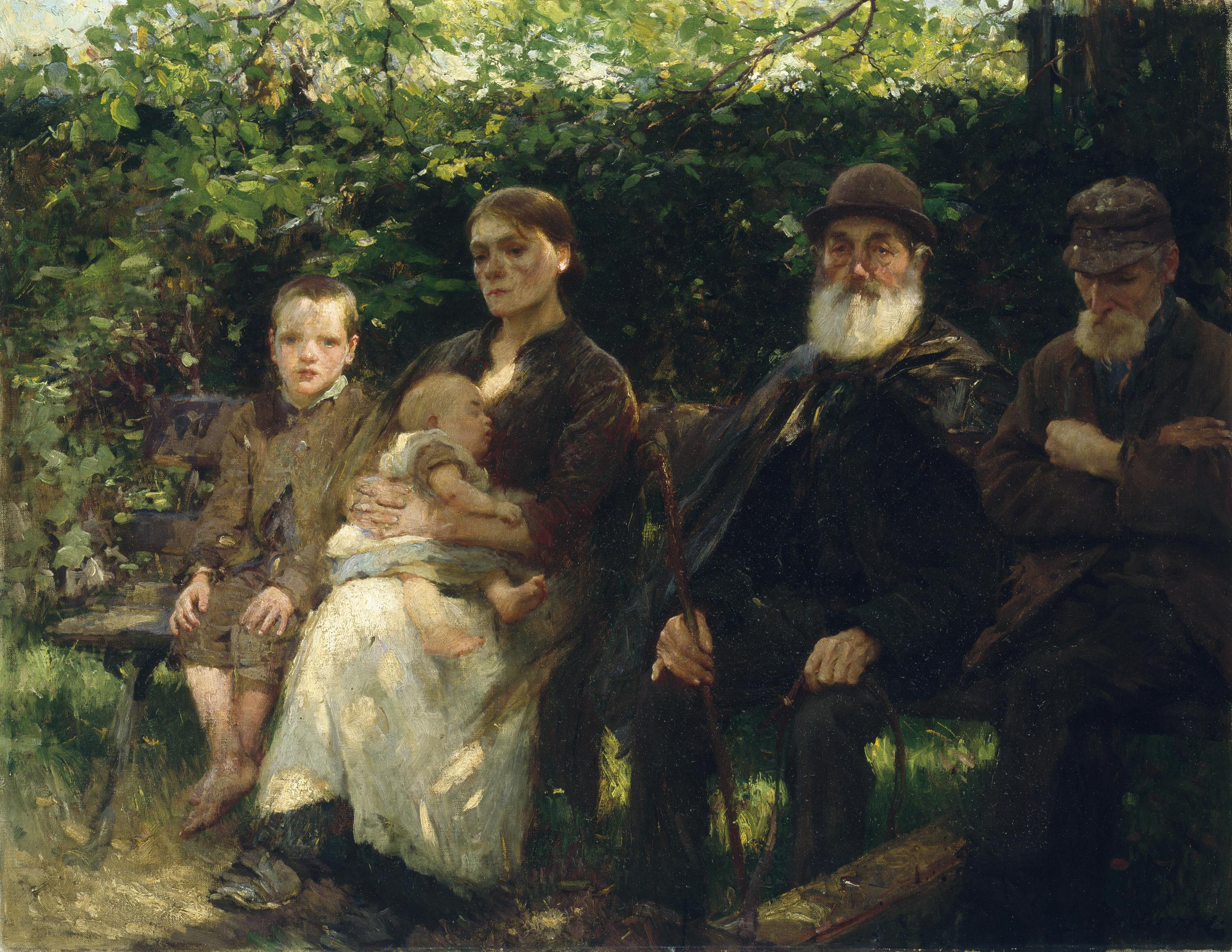
Walter Osborne, In a Dublin Park, Light and Shade, 1895

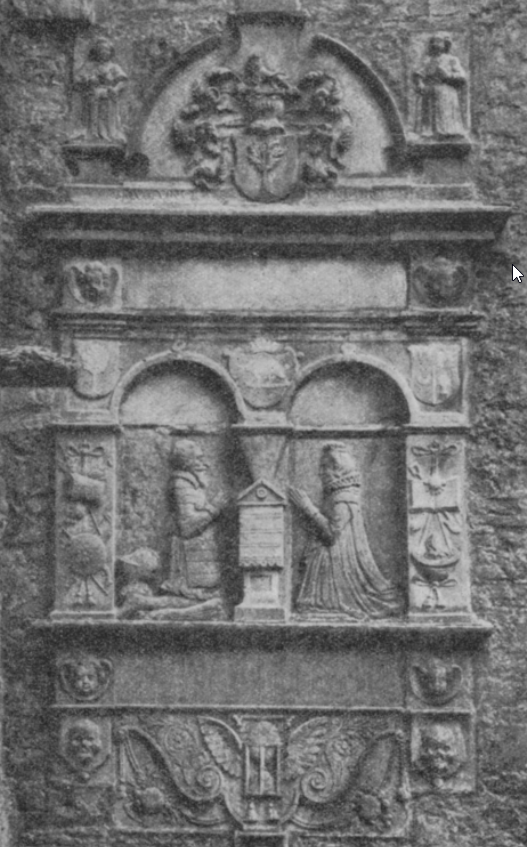
Monument for Sir O'Connor Sligo and his wife Eleanor Butler in Sligo Abbey. (1624)

Wars, rebellions, and unrest, concentrated in the late 16th century, from 1641 to the 1650s, and after 1688, greatly hindered the developments of the arts, and the processes exemplified by the Flight of the Earls in 1607 largely brought to an end the position of the old elites of Gaelic Ireland, who had been a mainstay of patronage for artists.

The visual arts were slow to develop in Early Modern Ireland, due to political disruption, and the lack of patrons in either government, the church, and wealthy resident landowners or business class interested in art. Yet beginning in the late 17th century, Irish painting began to develop, especially in portraiture and landscape painting.

The English portraitist James Gandy was brought to Ireland after his patron James Butler, 1st Duke of Ormond became Lord Deputy in 1661, and remained until his death in 1689. By the 1680s the Dutch Golden Age painter Ludowyk Smits was able to base himself in Ireland, mainly painting portraits. Irish painters typically looked outside Ireland for influence, training and clients who were wealthy enough to afford the purchase of art.

== After 1700 ==
By the 18th century an increasingly stable and prosperous Ireland was able to support a growing range of artists in various media, mostly based in Dublin. Edward Smyth (1749–1812), followed by his son John, got the main commissions for architectural sculpture. What became Belleek Pottery started around 1860, the first Irish manufacturer of fine ceramics, much for export.

What is now the National College of Art and Design in Dublin has existed since founded as the Dublin Art School in 1746, training a high proportion of the artists mentioned below. Its founder Robert West had studied drawing and painting at the French Academy under François Boucher and Jean-Baptiste van Loo. A sculpture school followed later, with Edward Smyth the first principal.

As in other areas of work, many artists based themselves in the much larger market offered by England for most of their careers, including the 18th-century landscapist George Barrett, Sr., the portraitist Nathaniel Hone the Younger, James Barry, Daniel Maclise, John Lavery and Sir William Orpen. Sir Martin Archer Shee, another portraitist, completed his training in London and stayed, becoming President of the Royal Academy in 1831. The portrait sculptor Christopher Hewetson (c.1737–1798) moved to Italy in his twenties, and never left, catching English aristocrats on the Grand Tour, and producing many busts of Pope Clement XIV. Thomas Hickey went as far as China, as the official artist of the Macartney Embassy in 1793, but is best known for his works produced during his several years in Bengal in India.

Despite great success in London and Florence, the portraitist Hugh Douglas Hamilton eventually returned to Dublin for the last years of his career. Philip Hussey from Cork, began as a sailor, being shipwrecked three times. He moved to painting ships' figureheards and exteriors, before starting a successful portrait practice in Dublin. Later, Walter Frederick Osborne developed his open air painting in France whereas Sir William Orpen studied in London.

In the second half of the 19th century a climate of cultural resurgence and nationalist ideals contributed to the development of an Irish style. A revived interest in the Irish language and Celtic history prompted a revival in the Irish visual arts as well. Belfast born Sir John Lavery may be the most internationally known painter of this generation. He trained in Glasgow and France, but unlike Orpen, maintained close ties to his native land. In 1928 he was commissioned to paint the symbol of Éire which would be used as the central image on the bank note of the new Irish Free State. Other paintings embodied the call for independence, such as Beatrice Elvery's Éire of 1907 which depicts the history of Irish Catholicism with the still-nascent Irish Republic.

== Artists ==
Early Irish masters include: Garret Morphey, Robert Carver, George Barrett, Sr., James Barry, Hugh Douglas Hamilton. The Irish impressionists included Roderic O'Conor and Walter Osborne, with other landscape artists: Augustus Nicholas Burke, Susanna Drury, Paul Henry, Nick Miller, Nathaniel Hone the Younger and Pat Harris.

Notable Irish sculptors have included Jerome Connor, John Henry Foley, Augustus Saint-Gaudens (born in Dublin, but emigrated to America at six months old), Mary Redmond, John Behan and Oliver Sheppard. Edward Delaney, Rachel Joynt, Patrick MacDowell and Rowan Gillespie are contemporary sculptors. Harry Clarke, Sarah Purser and Evie Hone worked in stained glass.

Portraitists have included Daniel Maclise, John Lavery, William Orpen (both these War Artists in WWI), John Butler Yeats (father of Jack and William Butler), Henry Jones Thaddeus and Nathaniel Hone the Elder.

Apart from Francis Bacon, who left Ireland as a young man, the best-known 20th-century Irish artist was Jack Yeats, brother of the poet, also with an individual style that is hard to classify. The art of Seán Keating was poised between Social Realism and Romanticism, and addressed public and political themes in an emerging nation.

Irish Modernism began with Mainie Jellett, with later participants being The White Stag group, The Exhibition of Living Art, Norah McGuinness, Louis le Brocquy, Patrick Scott, Patrick Swift, and John Kingerlee. Abstract expressionists included Tony O'Malley, Nano Reid and Patrick Collins.

In Northern Ireland notable artists have included John Luke, Colin Middleton, William Scott, Neil Shawcross, Gladys Maccabe (artist), Basil Blackshaw and Frank McKelvey.

== Contemporary art ==
Ireland's best known living artists include Brian O'Doherty an art historian, sculptor, and conceptual artist who is based in New York City, Sean Scully an abstract painter who lives and works in New York City, Dorothy Cross, a sculptor and filmmaker and James Coleman, an installation and video artist. Robert Ballagh, Willie Doherty, and Sean Hillen also work in modern media. The Irish Independent Artists exhibited at the David Hendrik's Gallery, Dublin during the 1970s and early 1980s. Joe O'Connor, figurative/dynamic painter of iconic sports heroes was one of its original members.

Interest in collecting Irish art has expanded rapidly with the economic expansion of the country, primarily focussing on investment in early twentieth century painters. Support for young Irish artists is still relatively minor compared to their European counterparts, as the Arts Council's focus has been on improving infrastructure and professionalism in venues.

An exhibition called 'The Art of a Nation: Irish Works from the Allied Irish Bank and Crawford Art Gallery Collection' was held between 13 and 31 May 2015 at the Mall Galleries, The Mall, London. It celebrated the story of Irish art from 1890s to the present day and included important works by Aloysius O'Kelly, Sir William Orpen, Jack B Yeats, William Scott, Sean Scully and Hughie O'Donoghue.

- Kevin Abosch, Gerard Byrne, Dorothy Cross, James Coleman, Amanda Coogan, Colin Davidson, Joe Dunne, Ross Eccles, Fergus Feehily, Gary Farrelly, Ronan Goti, James Hanley, Gottfried Helnwein, Sean Hillen, Mary Fitzgerald, Vera Klute, Stephen Lawlor, John Long, Paul McCloskey, Mick O'Dea, Nick Miller, Michael Mulcahy, Rasher, Peter Richards, Anne Rigney, Victor Sloan, Paul Seawright, Samuel Walsh, Conor Walton, Dana Winder

=== Mural painting ===
Northern Ireland has a significant tradition of political mural painting, from both the loyalist and republican standpoints.

== See also ==
- List of Irish artists
- Art galleries, centres and collections in Ireland
- Celtic art
