= Edward Leahy =

Edward Leahy may refer to:

- Edward L. Leahy (1886–1953), United States Senator and federal judge from Rhode Island
- Edward Daniel Leahy (1797–1875), Irish portrait and subject painter
