= Art galleries, centres and collections in Ireland =

This is a list of private and public art galleries, centres and collections on the island of Ireland arranged by county and city/town.

== Island of Ireland ==
=== County Antrim ===
==== Belfast ====
- Catalyst Arts
- Crescent Arts Centre
- Ormeau Baths Gallery
- Ulster Museum

=== County Cork ===
==== Cork City ====
- Crawford Municipal Art Gallery
- Lewis Glucksman Gallery

=== County Donegal ===
==== Letterkenny ====
- Glebe Gallery
- Letterkenny Regional Cultural Centre

=== County Dublin ===
==== Dublin City ====
- Chester Beatty Library
- City Arts Centre
- Douglas Hyde Gallery
- Hugh Lane Municipal Gallery
- Irish Museum of Modern Art (IMMA)
- Kerlin Gallery
- Molesworth Gallery
- National Gallery of Ireland
- Olivier Cornet Gallery
- Oriel Gallery
- Pallas Projects/Studios
- Project Arts Centre
- Royal Hibernian Academy (RHA)
- Taylor Galleries
- Temple Bar Gallery and Studios

=== County Galway ===
==== Galway City ====
- 126 Artist-run Gallery

=== County Kildare ===
==== Newbridge ====
- Riverbank Arts Centre

=== County Kilkenny ===
==== Kilkenny City ====
- Butler Gallery

=== County Limerick ===
==== Limerick City ====
- Limerick City Gallery of Art
- Hunt Museum
- National Self-Portrait Collection of Ireland / Kneafsey Gallery
- Ormston House

=== County Louth ===
==== Drogheda ====
- Highlanes Gallery

=== County Monaghan ===
==== Monaghan ====
- Market House, Monaghan

=== County Sligo ===
==== Sligo ====
- The Model, formerly the Model Arts and Niland Gallery

=== County Waterford ===
==== Lismore ====
- Lismore Castle

==== Waterford City ====
- Waterford Gallery of Art

=== County Westmeath ===
==== Athlone ====
- Luan Gallery

=== County Wexford ===
==== Wexford ====
- Wexford Arts Centre

=== County Wicklow ===
- Russborough House

== International ==
- Irish Arts Centre, New York
- Centre Culturel Irlandais, Paris

== Major collections ==
- Arts Council of Ireland
- Arts Council of Northern Ireland
- Office of Public Works
