= Diarmuid Ó Ceallacháin =

Diarmuid Ó Ceallacháin (1915-1993) was an Irish painter known for his landscape and figurative work. He won a number of awards including the Taylor Prize and a diploma and medal (Prix Thorlet) from the Academie Francaise. He was teacher of painting at the Crawford School of Art and Design in Cork city from 1940 to 1970.

== Early life ==
Diarmuid Ó Ceallacháin (Jeremiah/Jerome O´Callaghan) was born on 31 October 1915 near Drimoleague, County Cork. He grew up in Cork City and was educated at the North Monastery Secondary School. At the age of 15 he became a draper's apprentice and during this time he also attended evening classes in painting and drawing at the Crawford School of Art and in 1937 he enrolled as a full-time day student. In 1938 he won the Taylor Scholarship at the Royal Dublin Society with his painting "The Struggle" depicting a violent encounter between police and Irish Travellers. This enabled him to study at the National College of Art and Design in Dublin where his teachers were Maurice MacGonigal and Séan Keating. In 1939 he won the Taylor Prize with the painting entitled "No Peace on Earth" inspired by the bombing of London that year and the start of World War II.

== Career ==
On his return to Cork in 1940 he took up the position of full-time teacher of painting at the Crawford School of Art, a position he held until his retirement in 1970. In 1943 he and Joan O´Sullivan married. Over many years she was the subject for some of his most intense portraits and a model for many of the female figures in his work.

His interest in landscape painting and the Irish language led him to the west of Ireland where, as a student, he attended Charles Lambe's summer schools. Later he returned and stayed with Muiris Ó Súilleabháin perfecting his Irish and painting out of doors "developing his own palette and subtle tonal responses".

He exhibited twenty works in the Royal Hibernian Academy between 1938 and 1961 and an exhibition of his work was held at the Dublin Painter's Gallery in 1948. He also exhibited regularly at the Munster Fine Art Exhibition. In 1958 he was awarded a diploma and medal by the Academie Francais (Prix Thorlet) for drawings exhibited in Paris.

He travelled widely and painted in many countries. In the 1950s he toured Spain with his friend Cecil Galbally. He spent time in New York in 1962 where he visited the Art Students League of New York and also worked in France, Germany, Greece and the Middle East. In 1977, Eoghan Harris produced a programme for RTÉ (Irish national broadcaster) about his work, in which he was interviewed in Irish by Patrick Gallagher.

A major retrospective exhibition of paintings from 1937 to 1990 took place in 1991 at the Crawford Municipal Art Gallery, Cork. In the catalogue essay Nuala Fenton remarked that the different styles which evolved over that time period were "developments which relate very much to the changes in the artist's life, concerns and environment"

=== Legacy ===
After his death on 20 April 1993, an exhibition was held in Sligo Art Gallery and in Siamsa Tíre, Tralee in 1994.His work is in many private and corporate collections in Ireland, the U.K. and U.S.A.and the Crawford Municipal Art Gallery holds six of his paintings in its permanent collection. One of these paintings "The Fiddler" has been the inspiration for two musical compositions; Serendipity by Philip Martin, and Colourvision by John Gibson (Commissioned by Tableaux Networks, Cork Institute of Technology), and poem of the same title by Aidan Murphy published in the collection "Stark Naked Blues".

In the 1996 James Adam's "Important Irish Art" auction, a special section of the catalogue featured his work describing him as "Cork's finest Twentieth Century painter". His work has also been auctioned in De Veres, Whytes and Sothebys.

His daughter, Noel O'Callaghan, is also an artist and in 2018 a joint exhibition of works by father and daughter was shown in the Uillinn Centre in Skibbereen.

== Work in collections ==
- Crawford Municipal Art Gallery, Cork.
