= John Long (artist) =

Irish artist (1964–2016)

- Born: John Long; 30 August 1964; Portadown, Northern Ireland
- Died: 25 April 2016 (aged 51)
- Education: Byam Shaw School of Art, Slade School of Fine Art
- Known for: Portrait painting, Still life, Oil painting
- Movement: Irish Art
- Awards: Taylor de Vere, Dublin; Arts Council of Northern Ireland Award; Year of the Artist Award, South East Arts; Elizabeth Greenshields Foundation Award, Canada; Elected Member Royal Hibernian Academy
- Website: http://www.johnlongartist.co.uk

John Long (born 1964, Portadown, County Armagh, Northern Ireland, died 2016, Northern Ireland) was an artist whose work was exhibited in Dublin and London, as well as in the United States. He was a member of the Royal Hibernian Academy, and a widely-sought lecturer and teacher. His work has been compared to Velázquez, Peiraikos, Chardin, and Cézanne.

== Biography ==
=== Early years ===
Born in Portadown 30 August 1964, Long studied at the Belfast College of Art and Design before pursuing a Higher Diploma in Painting at Slade School of Fine Art, where he studied under Euan Uglow. Upon its completion, he took up the position of Artist in Residence at the Byam Shaw School of Art.

=== Work and awards ===
In London, Long exhibited with Theo Waddington Fine Art in 1998 and in Dublin his first solo exhibition was with European Fine Art in 1993. He subsequently had four solo exhibitions with Jorgensen Fine Art in Dublin in 1999, 2003, 2009 and 2013. He also exhibited at the Royal Hibernian Academy Banquet Exhibition, Dublin and at the RHA's annual exhibitions. Consequently, he was awarded the Taylor de Vere award in 1993, and in 1995 was made an associate member of the Academy. The Arts Council of Northern Ireland recognised his work with awards in 1993 and 1994. Among the major group exhibitions at which Long's work was shown are "The Importance of Drawing" exhibition at The Royal Museum, Canterbury; the "Spring Contemporary Exhibition" at the Albany Gallery, London; the "British Art Fair" at the Royal College of Art London and at the "Vital Presence" exhibition at the Belltable Arts Centre, Limerick. Waddington Tribby Fine Art, Boca Raton, Florida exhibited his work in 2002. Long's work in oil on canvas has been described as unafraid "to shy from depicting the mundane and the trivial" and has been noted for its "passion for little things and inclination to save them from dismissal".

=== Teaching ===
John taught in various colleges including the National College of Art and Design, Dublin. He taught for fifteen years at Canterbury Christ Church University in Kent, becoming Senior Lecturer in Painting. In 2010 he was invited to give a masterclass and lecture at the RHA. He also taught at the Taichung Academy of Fine Art in Taiwan, and Dun Laoghaire College of Art And Design. In 2010 he was made a full member of the RHA.

=== Final years ===
In 2014, after being diagnosed with cancer, John ceased teaching. In 2015 he returned to Northern Ireland to be with his family, and died there on 25 April 2016 aged 51.

== Bibliography ==
- Who's Who in Art, 33rd ed. Hillmarton Manor Press, 2007, ISBN 978-0-904722-42-0
- British Art by Julian Freeman, South Bank Publishing, 2006, ISBN 1-904915-05-1
- A Dictionary of Artists in Britain since 1945 by David Buckman, ISBN 0-9532609-0-9
- Who's Who in Art, 30th ed. Hillmarton Manor Press, 2001, ISBN 0-900083-19-0
