= Edward Daniel Leahy =

Irish artist (1797–1875)

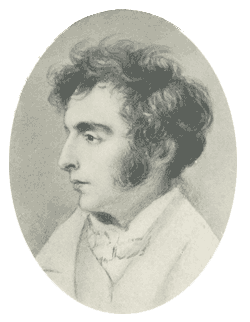
- Edward Daniel Leahy by J. P. Davis, 1830.
- Born: 29 June 1797; Cork
- Died: 9 February 1875 (aged 77); Brighton
- Other name: E. D. Leahy
- Occupation: Painter

Edward Daniel Leahy (29 June 1797 – 9 February 1875) was an Irish portrait and subject painter. He was trained in Dublin, where he began his career before establishing himself in London.

== Biography ==
According to Walter Strickland's Dictionary of Irish Artists (1913), Leahy was born in London, son of Daniel Leahy of Dublin, whose family were originally from Cork. His gravestone, however, bears an inscription saying that he was born in Cork on 29th June 1797.An article published in the Cork Examiner in the mid-1840s, describes him as a "Cork man", adding that "we hope he will remain sufficiently long amongst us to enable his fellow-citizens to take advantage of this, his first visit for many years to his native city".

He studied at the Dublin Society's School, where he won several prizes between 1811 and 1814. He exhibited two portraits at the Hibernian Society of Artists in 1815, as well as a self-portrait and a "Portrait of a Gentleman" in the Dublin Society's premises in Hawkins Street. He was then living at No. 2 Fleet Street, Dublin. In 1816, having moved to Anglesea Street, he submitted four portraits, including one of himself, to the exhibition in Hawkins Street and was awarded a premium by the Irish Institute. He exhibited three works in 1817, and shortly afterwards moved to London, where he established himself as a portrait and subject painter.

He first showed at the Royal Academy in London in 1820, making his debut with a portrait of Mrs. Yates in the role of Meg Merrilies. He became a frequent exhibitor of portraits and historical subjects, both at the Academy and at the British Institution. Prince Augustus Frederick, Duke of Sussex and the Marquess of Bristol sat to him, as did various prominent Irishmen including the Earl of Rosse, Richard Lalor Sheil MP, Sir Matthew Tierney M.D. and William Cuming, president of the Royal Hibernian Academy, whose portrait Leahy later presented to the R.H.A. . His subject pictures included The Battle of the Nile and The Battle of Trafalgar (1825); Mary Stuart's Farewell to France, (1826, engraved); Jacques and the Wounded Stag (1830); Escape of Mary Queen of Scots from Loch Leven Castle, (1837, painted for Lord Egremont) and Lady Jane Grey summoned to Execution (1844). His Catching the Expression, shown in 1824, depicted, according to one review, Leahy and Edwin Landseer together in a studio.

Following the death of the Royal Academician William Owen in 1825, Leahy completed many of his unfinished portraits.

Despite his move to England, Leahy continued to exhibit in Dublin occasionally until 1846, sometimes showing works that had been seen in London some years earlier. When his Mary Queen of Scots' Farewell to France was shown there in 1842 it was purchased by the Royal Irish Art Union. During a visit to Cork in 1846, Leahy painted a portrait of Father Mathew, the "Apostle of Temperance", in connection with a commission from Dwarkanath Tagore. It is now in the National Portrait Gallery, London.

Between 1837 and 1843 Leahy lived in Italy, and while in Rome painted a portrait of the sculptor John Gibson, RA. After his return to England he exhibited a few Italian subjects, showing at the Royal Academy for the last time in 1863. He died at Brighton on 9 February 1875.

== Gallery ==
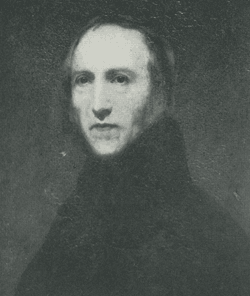
William Cuming

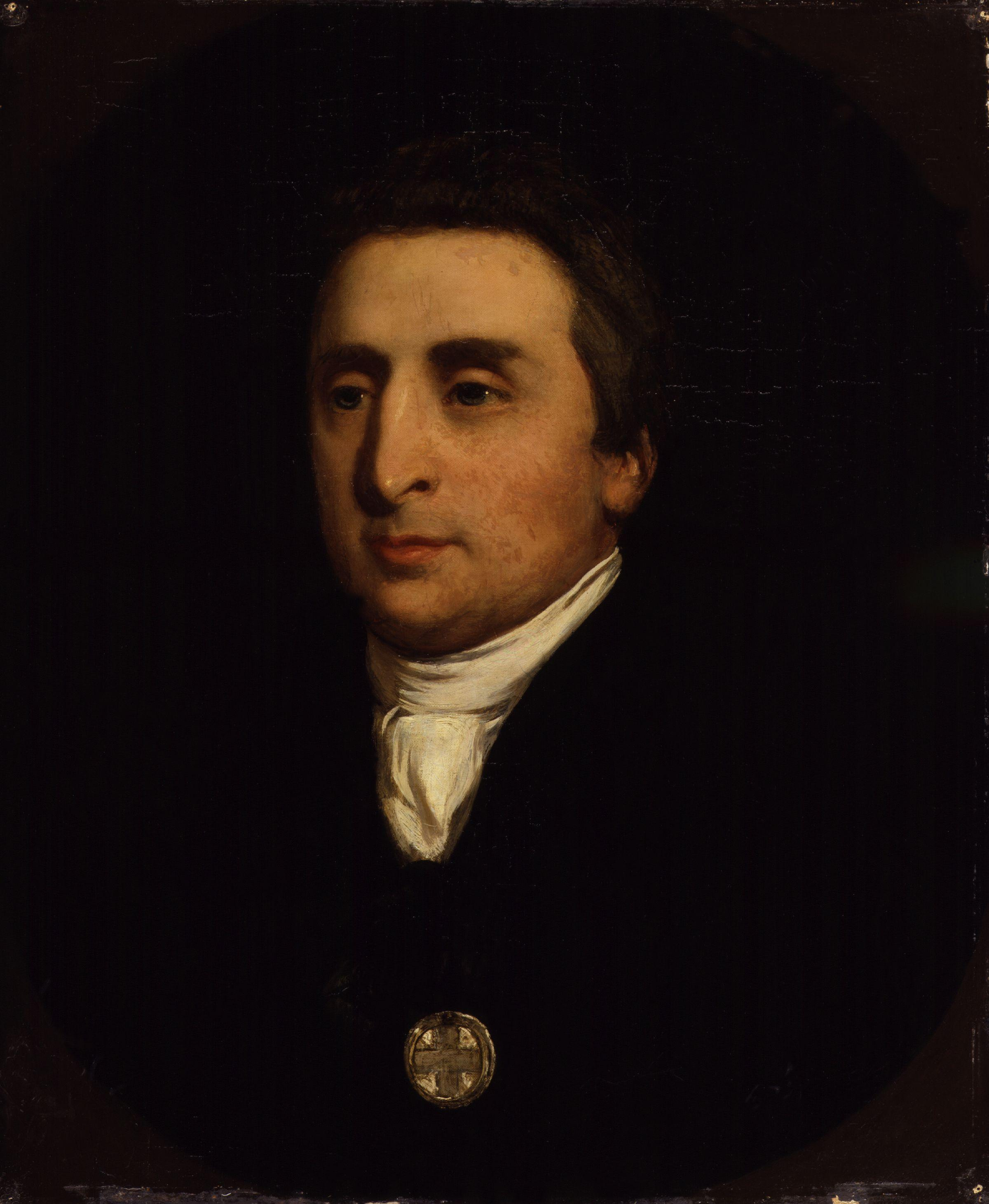
Theobald Mathew

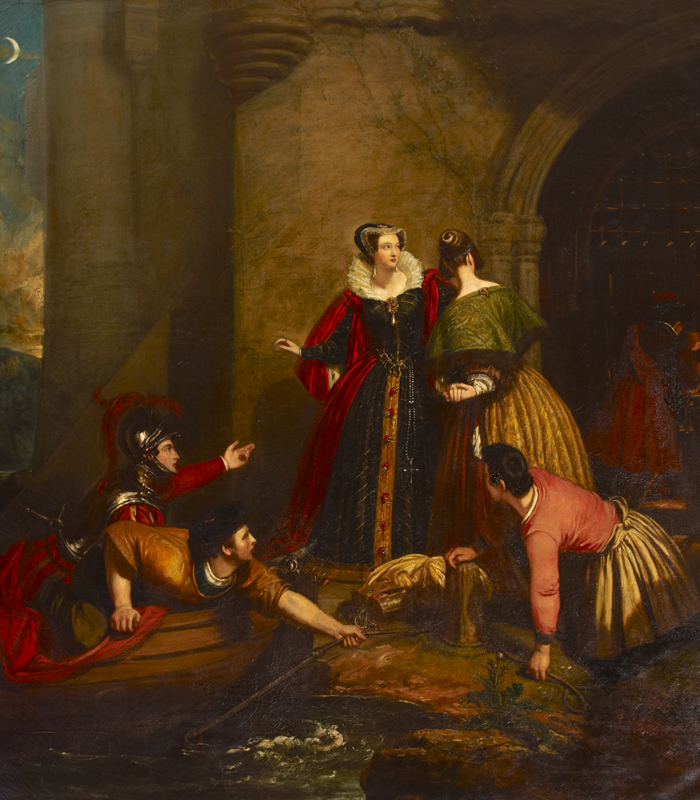
Mary, Queen of Scots

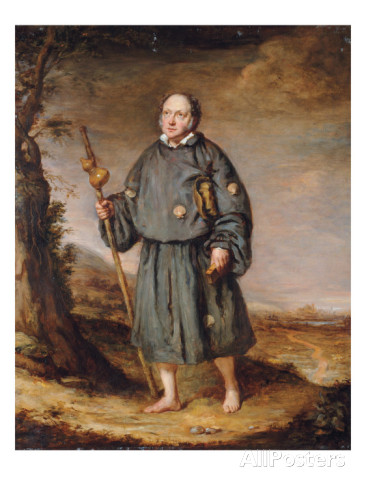
Portrait of a Gentleman as a Pilgrim, 1836

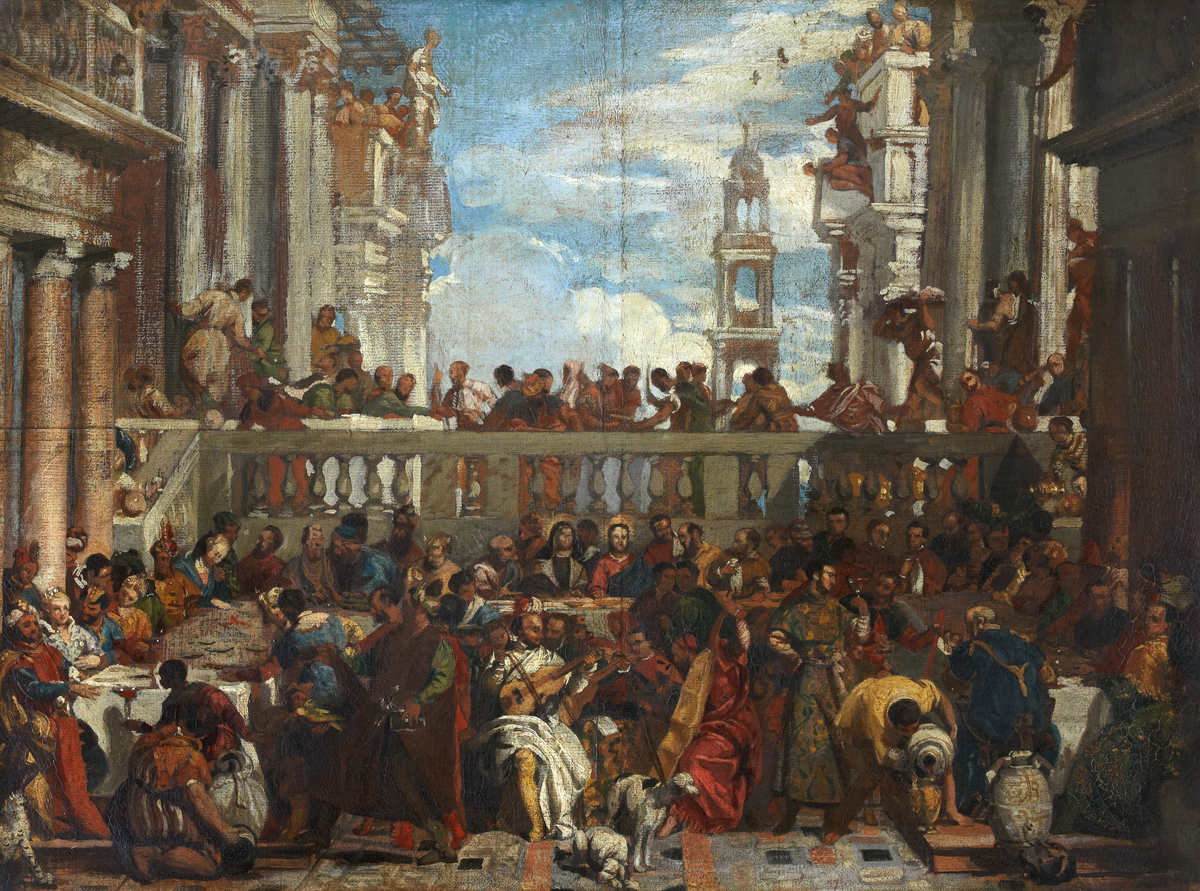
The Marriage at Cana (after Paolo Veronese)

== Sources ==
Attribution

This article incorporates text from a publication now in the public domain: O'Donoghue, Freeman Marius (1892). "Leahy, Edward Daniel". In Lee, Sidney (ed.). Dictionary of National Biography. Vol. 32. London: Smith, Elder & Co.
