= Richard Moynan =

Irish painter (1856–1906)

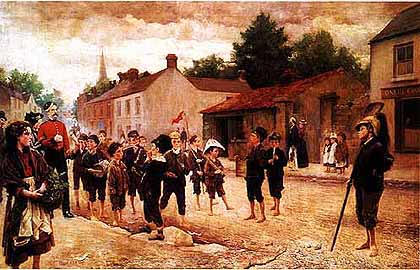
Military Maneuvers, oil on canvas, 148 x 240 cm, National Gallery of Ireland, Dublin

Richard Thomas Moynan (27 April 1856 – 10 April 1906) was an Irish painter. Moynan was born in Dublin and studied there at the Metropolitan School.

== Early life ==
Moynan originally set out to study medicine, but opted for a career in the arts shortly before his final examinations. He enrolled at the Dublin Metropolitan School of Art (now National College of Art and Design) in the autumn of 1879 and found quick success by winning both the Taylor and Cowper (awarded to the best drawing from life) competitions. In 1883 Moynan attended the Academy in Antwerp along with Roderic O'Conor and Henry Allen. He studied there until moving to Paris in 1885. By the late 1880s Moynan had returned to his native Dublin to exhibit his paintings, becoming a member of the Royal Hibernian Academy in 1890.

== Later life and death ==
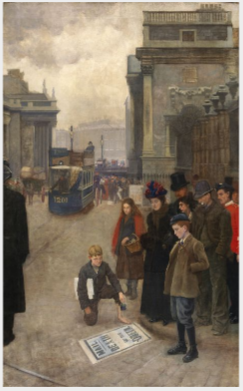
'The Death Of The Queen' 1902

In 1884, he married his cousin Suzanna Mary Moynan in her home on 9 April in Thurles, County Tipperary. He had two children, Eileen Nora and Francis Henry, aged 13 and 9 when the census was recorded in 1901. His family resided in No.15 Garville Avenue, Rathgar, Co. Dublin along with a domestic servant.

In 1887, he was employed by a Dublin newspaper, The Union, as a political cartoonist. During his time as a cartoonist, he used the pseudonym "Lex". He was a leading exhibitor at the Royal Hibernian Academy with works such as "bleak house", "a travelling show" and "military manoeuvres" being some of the pieces displayed here. Moynan had issues with intemperance and tuberculosis, which ultimately led to his career and health decline. In the final years of his life, there was little work created by him, only a final painting which was submitted to the academy in 1902 titled "The Death Of The Queen" which depicted the death of Queen Victoria and the reaction of people from Dublin who were standing around a newspaper boy. He was absent in 1903 and 1904 but submitted an unimportant work in 1905. On 10 April 1906, he died at his residence at 15 Garville Avenue, Rathgar and was buried in Mount Jerome on 12 April aged 50 years.

Following his death, his work has been featured across different exhibitions such as "The French Connection" in 2010 and "Ireland: Her people and landscape" in 2012. His work had consistent themes of street children and unionism.
