= Nick Miller (artist) =

Irish artist (born 1962)

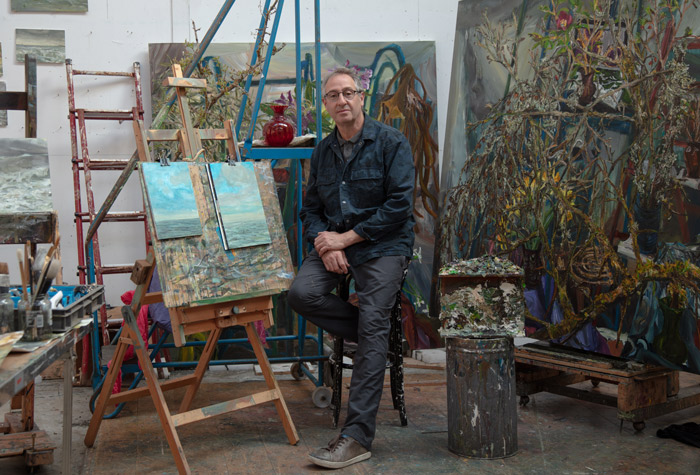
- Nick Miller, Sligo studio
- Born: 2 August 1962 (age 64); London, England
- Occupations: Visual artist, painter
- Website: nickmiller.ie

Nick Miller (born 1962 in London) is an Irish contemporary artist who has become known for reinvigorating painting and drawing in the traditional genres of portraiture, landscape and still-life. He has developed an intense and individual approach to the practice of working directly from life, that has been described as a form of encounter painting.

== Biography ==
In 1984, after graduating in Development Studies at the University of East Anglia he moved to Ireland to pursue his interest in painting. He has lived and worked in County Clare, Dublin, and apart from periods working in the US, he has largely been based in County Sligo since 1992. In 2018, after 34 years, he became an Irish citizen. He has become one of Ireland's leading contemporary painters. In recognition of his significant contribution to Irish Art, he was elected to Aosdána in 2001.

== Exhibitions ==
Significant solo museum exhibitions of his work have taken place at the Irish Museum of Modern Art (South African Works in 1994, and Nick Miller and the Studio of Edward McGuire in 2015-16) and, The Royal Hibernian Academy, Dublin in 2003(Figure To Ground); The Butler Gallery, Kilkenny Castle in 2004(Genre); Limerick City Gallery of Art and Centre Culturel Irlandais, Paris in 2007(Truckscapes: Drawings). In 2008 he exhibited Truckscapes: Paintings at the gallery of the historic New York Studio School.

== Career ==
In 1997 he converted a truck, a mobile British Telecom workshop, into a mobile studio, facilitating work on large-scale paintings and drawings in the landscape, yet protected from the elements. He began to gain critical recognition in the early 2000s exhibiting work that tackled the traditionally conservative tradition of Irish Landscape painting through his particular approach of encounter painting to portray land and nature in the rural West of Ireland. The Mobile Studio enabled a highly productive 15-year period work that explored Landscape through the interface of the artist with both culture and nature. The "Truckscapes" were distinguished by the inclusion of the doorway of the truck, itself covered in splattered paint, as a painted meeting with nature defined by the artist and the reality of the 'truck-view'. Examples such as "From Cogan's Shed" (2004) can be found in collections of the National Gallery of Ireland, "From Cogan's Shed" (2007) Limerick City Gallery of Art, and "Whitethorn, truck-view" (2000-2001) The Irish Museum of Modern Art.

Portraiture, and the formal meeting with his subject is a central tenet of Miller's practice influencing his approach to all genres of painting. For the artist, the artwork is the remains of a lived and painted encounter. In a seminal series of large-scale CLOSER drawings made from 1996-2000 and shown in Dublin and London Miller drew his subjects, mostly close family and friends to make unconventional portraits including Corban (1996), Collection of IMMA, of the Irish artist Corban Walker. These drawings were made at very close quarters, exploring a single-point perspective, face-to-face and straddling the subjects on the paper they were being drawn on the floor.

Amongst subjects, both well-known and unknown, Miller has painted the author John McGahern (1998) The Niland Collection Sligo, and a full seated figure Portrait of John Hogan (2004), a farmer and neighbour of the artist for 16 years, during a period living on Lough Arrow, County Sligo. The painting is now in the collection of the Hugh Lane Gallery, Dublin City Gallery, Dublin City Gallery. In 2014 he received the inaugural Hennessy Portrait Prize, held at the National Gallery of Ireland. The award included a commission to paint the Irish musician Donal Lunny for the National Portrait Collection, and was given for his 2013 painting "Last sitting: Portrait of Barrie Cooke", a fellow artist, and friend of Miller's who died in 2014. Both paintings are in the collection of the National Gallery of Ireland.

In 2014 he was invited by the Irish Museum of Modern Art to respond to the donated studio contents of the renowned Irish portrait and still life painter Edward McGuire (1932–1986), now in the museum's collection. Miller took up residency in the museum, spending time with McGuire's work studio contents and personal belongings. During the residency, he made a series of still-life paintings of objects and the many stuffed birds that McGuire was renowned for painting. McGuire had died not long after Miller settled in Dublin, in 1986. As a way to connect to the man, he had not met, but whose work Miller admired, he invited a number of McGuire's sitters to come and sit for him in IMMA and talk about Edward, often over 30 years later. These included Theresa Browne, Garech Browne, Wanda Ryan, and the poets Anthony Cronin and Paul Durcan. The resulting exhibition at the museum: Nick Miller and the Studio of Edward McGuire (November 2016 -May 2016) featured both artists' works on similar subjects, and an installation of McGuire's studio belongings with a film made by Miller about McGuire's renowned "Colour Dictionary"

In the same way that Miller attempts to reinvigorate traditions around landscape and portraiture, he continues to evolve the genre of the 'still life', often merging still life with portraiture. In more recent years, since 2011 he began to return to painting elements of nature, flowers, weeds, branches and even seaweed, placed in a variety of vases. Initially painted on a domestic scale, this series of works are known as Vessels: Nature Morte. Jackie Wullschläger describes the paintings: "Still life is always about holding time, but Miller's swiftly executed paintings also convey growth to decay, almost surreally speeded up: flowers bloom, glisten, wilt within each rapid painterly performance." They were painted over a number of years as a way to hold a connection to his dying mother. In the more recent Rootless paintings Miller works with experiences of disintegration and order, as he takes the still lives to a monumental scale, affirming the primacy of 'Nature' as a true and vital reality.
