= Patrick Wybrant =

Irish painter (1816–1894)

- Born: 1816; County Wicklow, Ireland
- Died: 1894 (aged 77–78); Knaresborough, West Riding of Yorkshire
- Known for: watercolour portraiture

Patrick Wybrant (1816 – 1894) was an Irish born artist who worked in Great Britain and the United States, who often signed his paintings as "Wybrant Artist".

== Life ==
Example of Wybrant's work, a watercolor portrait in profile.

Detail: artist's signature.

Patrick Wybrant was born in Rathdrum, County Wicklow in 1816. He painted in Great Britain from 1849 to 1852, spent approximately three years in the United States, and returned to work in Yorkshire around 1855. He may have continued to work until his death, in Knaresborough, West Riding of Yorkshire in 1894.

Several American art dealers and commentators have incorrectly identified him as having been a Native American. A typical Wybrant painting is a portrait, a profile view done in watercolour, signed "Wybrant Artist" and dated in numerals. Little information has been published about Wybrant on the internet; what exists tends to be spurious copy devised to promote sales of the portraits. His paintings have value for those interested in 19th century fashion.
