= Rasher (artist) =

Irish figurative artist (born 1977)

Rasher (real name Mark Kavanagh; born 1977) is an Irish figurative artist, best known for his detailed and colourful work on the human figure, and still lifes.

== Early life ==
Rasher was born in the seaside town of Bray, County Wicklow. As a boy he attended St Killian's School and later St Thomas VEC. The nickname Rasher has stuck with him since he was a child. Apart from a yearlong plc course at his local college in Bray, Rasher is a self-taught artist who has achieved commerciality.

When he first thought of painting, Rasher says his father thought he was crazy and that he would never make a living out of it. "I mopped floors in supermarkets so I could paint during the day." Eventually his parents allowed him use his bedroom as a studio. When he first got accepted into a gallery, he sold his paintings to it for £50 and was just left with enough money to buy more paint. At this stage, he was producing a painting at a rate of one every two weeks.

After several self-mounted shows which attracted the interest of admirers far and wide, he held a one-man exhibition in Dublin. He was profiled in several respected newspapers and made an appearance on The Late Late Show which brought him to national attention.

== Influences ==
He is influenced by the works of Caravaggio, Dalí, Bacon and Hopper. His still lives are influenced by a trip to Italy and the Old Masters works which he saw on this trip. In Los Angeles he was heavily influenced by the bold and harsh light of his surroundings.

== Recent career ==
In 2004, Rasher was asked by Jameson to do a commercial commission. He has since completed many paintings for the brand. On the commission, Rasher had the following to say, "I had never done anything else like this before and I will try anything once. It's a 200 year old brand and I am a 28 year-old man so I liked the contrast between old and new."

While his principal work has always been the human figure, his recent work has included a number of flowerscapes. In his newer paintings, Rasher continues to probe deeply into the hallucinatory world of love and loss that has marked his work from the beginning. The bold bright eye-catching colours are inspired by a trip to the Mediterranean.

His exhibition, 'Into the Blue' took place in the Chateau Marmont in Los Angeles in early 2006.

One of his paintings has fetched more than €16,000 at an auction. Among his patrons have been the late King Hussein of Jordan. Owners of his work include Tom Cruise, Colin Farrell and Princess Haya of Jordan.

Rasher still lives and works in Wicklow. He made an appearance on Irish television channel TV3's breakfast show Ireland AM on January 31, 2007.

== His name ==
Rasher was asked by Hot Press's Peter Murphy where he got his nickname. "I grew up on a council estate in Bray, and everybody had a nickname, same as anywhere. One summer, I must have been about five or six, I was sunburned on my back, I’d really blonde hair and I was really skinny, and my brother’s friend said, "Jesus, he looks like a streaky rasher."

== Quotes ==
- "It's a long way from [selling paintings for] 50 quid in the first gallery."
- "Paint because you love it, not because of the money."
