= Freeman Marius O'Donoghue =

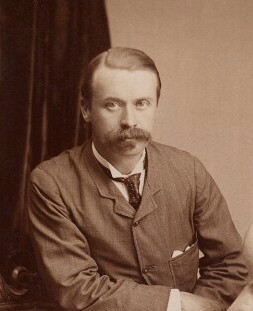
1886 photograph of O'Donoghue.

Freeman Marius O'Donoghue (1849 – 9 December 1929) was an art historian and biographer of Irish descent.

Born in London, where he also died, he joined the British Museum's Department of Prints and Drawings in the post of junior assistant aged around 17, rising to Assistant Keeper under Sidney Colvin by the time of his retirement (delayed to complete a special catalogue) aged 57. He was a Fellow of the Society of Antiquaries of London and a member of the Reform Club, along with being noted for several contributions to the Dictionary of National Biography.
