= Riverbank Arts Centre =

Facility in Newbridge, County Kildare, Ireland

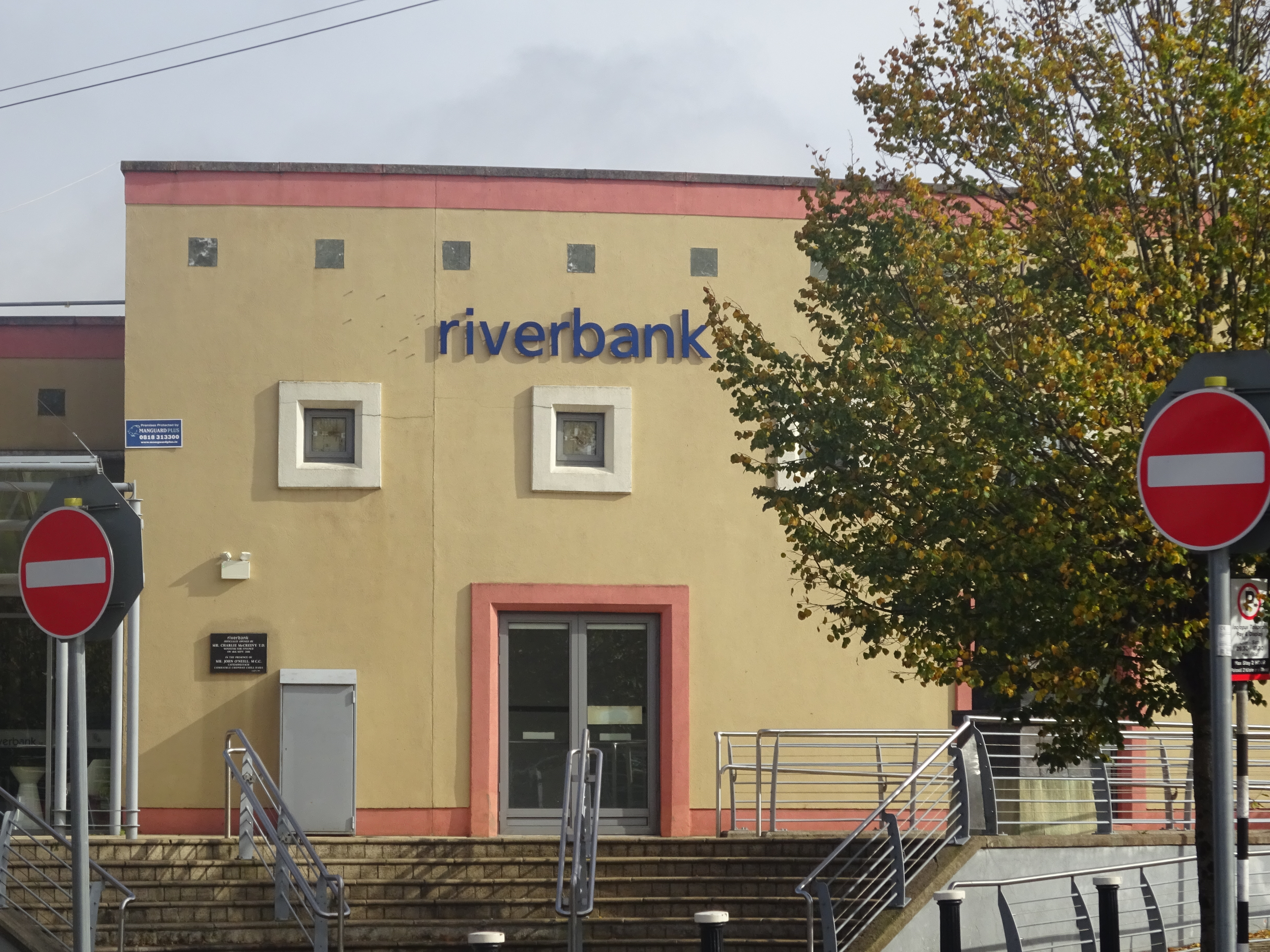

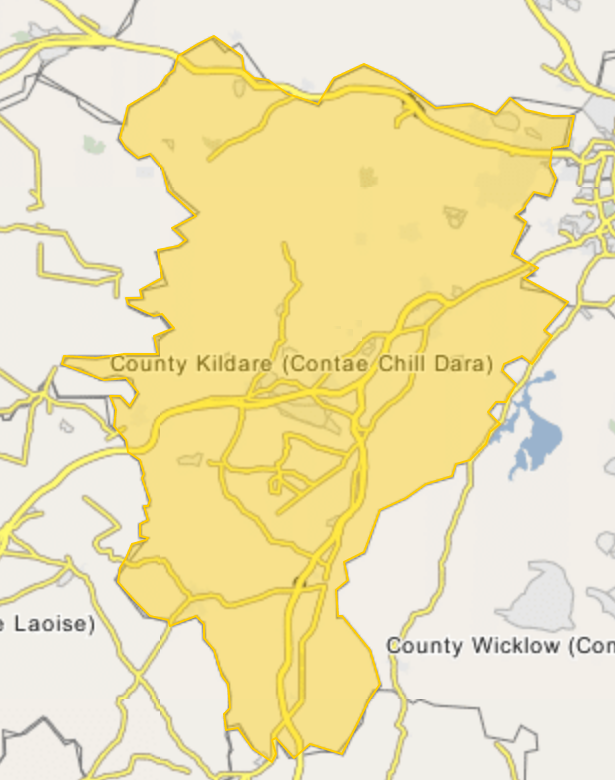
- Location within County Kildare
- Address: Main Street
- Location: Newbridge, County Kildare, Ireland
- Coordinates: 53°10′55″N 6°47′40″W
- Capacity: 180
- Public transit: Newbridge; Newbridge bus stop

Website
- riverbank.ie

Riverbank Arts Centre (Irish: Ionad Ealaíon Bhruach na hAbhann) is a multi-disciplinary (theatre, comedy, music, and visual arts) arts centre in Newbridge, County Kildare, Ireland.

Located close to the M7 motorway, the Riverbank Arts Centre also has a café.
