= William Cuming =

Irish artist (1769–1852)

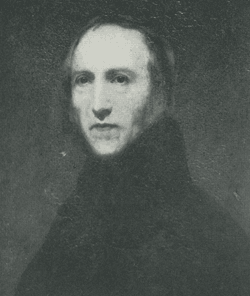
- William Cuming by E. D. Leahy
- Born: 1769; Tymon, County Dublin
- Died: 5 April 1852 (aged 82–83)
- Occupations: Painter, art dealer, and engraver

William Cuming (1769 – 5 April 1852) was an Irish portrait painter, a president of the Royal Hibernian Academy.

== Life ==
Cuming was born in 1769 the youngest of the four sons of William Cuming. He became a pupil in the Dublin Society's Schools in 1785, where he won a silver medal in 1790 for figure-drawing. Having completed his training he established himself as a historical and portrait painter in Crow Street, Dublin. In 1793 he was commissioned by the Corporation of Dublin to paint the portrait of Alderman Henry Gore Sankey, a former Lord Mayor.

In 1795 Cuming moved into his brother Hugh's house in Anglesea Street, where he remained until 1808, when he moved to 15 Clare Street. In 1800, he made his first contributions to the exhibitions held by the artists of Dublin in Dame Street. He showed eleven portraits in the exhibition that year, and his work featured at most of the exhibitions until 1813. He was particularly noted for his portraits of female sitters. He was, however, financially secure enough not to need to be a prolific artist, and spent a lot of time travelling around Europe.

In 1811 he was President of the Society of Artists in Dublin, and in 1823 he was chosen to be one of the original members of the newly founded of the Royal Hibernian Academy. He exhibited in the academy from its first exhibition in 1826 until 1831, contributing fifteen pictures in all. In April 1829 he was elected president of the academy, a position he held until October 1832, when he resigned and retired from his painting. In that year he visited his brother Josias, the owner of a sugar-plantation, in the West Indies. On his return he did, however, continue his involvement with the academy, becoming treasurer in 1835. He finally resigned his membership in January 1837, and was made an honorary member. In 1827, he was elected into the National Academy of Design as an Honorary Academician.

He died at his home in Lower Abbey Street, Dublin, on 5 April 1852.

Charles C. Ingham was his pupil. According to William Dunbar, writing in 1834, Ingham always spoke of Cuming as "an excellent artist, a liberal man, and a finished gentleman."
