= Patrick Hickey (artist) =

Irish artist (1927–1998)

- Born: 27 April 1927; Bannu, British India
- Died: 16 October 1998 (aged 71)

Patrick Hickey (Bannu, British India 27 April 1927 – Dublin 16 October 1998) was an Irish printmaker, painter, artist and architect who founded the Graphic Studio Dublin in 1961.

== Early life, family, and education ==
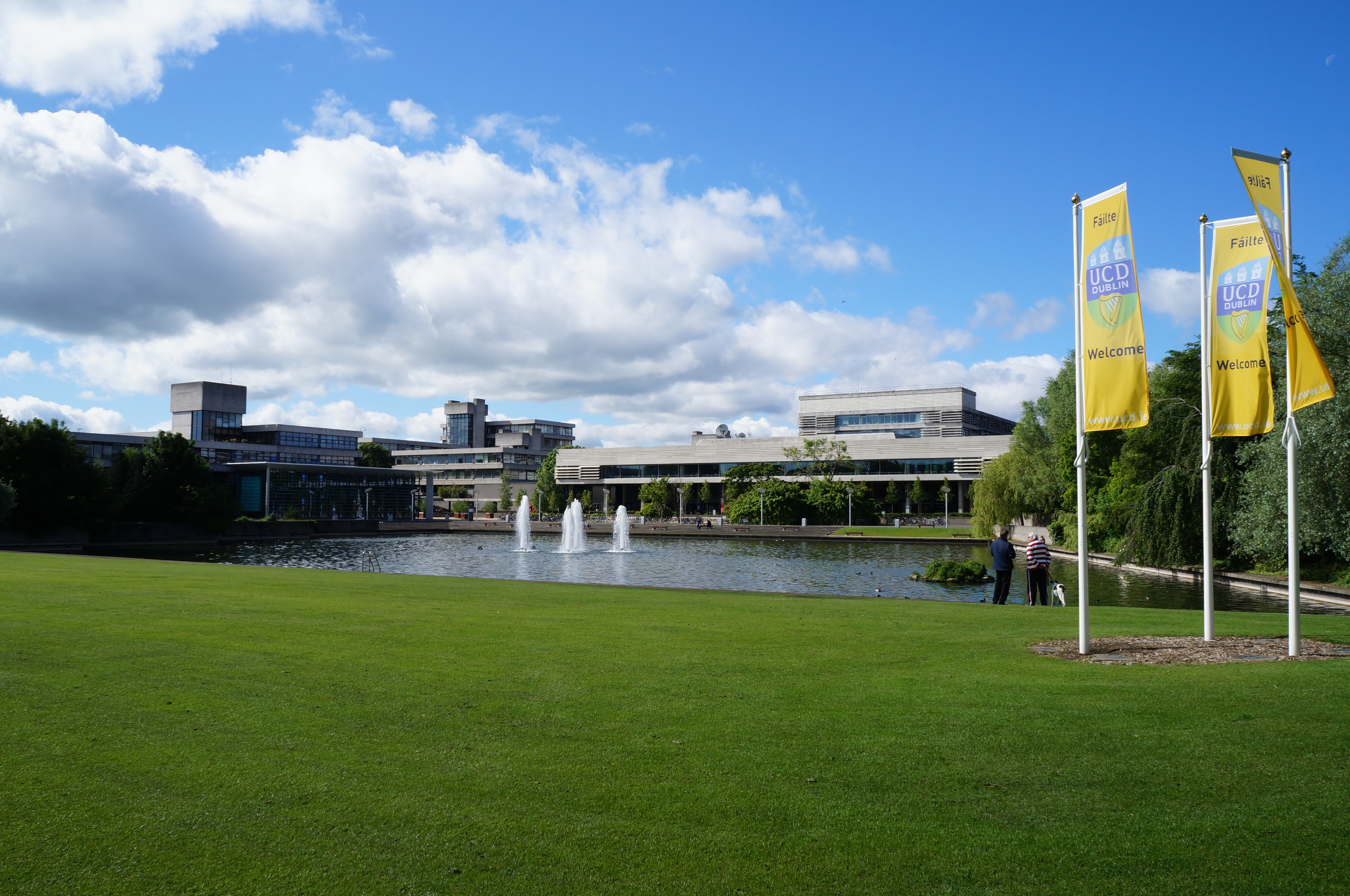
University College Dublin.

Patrick Hickey was born 27 April 1927 in Bannu, British India, which is now a part of Pakistan. His father served as a colonel in the Indian Army's 1st Punjab Regiment. Hickey discovered early on that he had a passion for art, although his family had no particular artistic background. His family returned to England, settling in Bedford. Hickey was educated at Ampleforth College between 1939 and 1945. Despite his passion for art, Hickey chose to postpone painting professionally until he had completed a thorough academic education, reflecting the financial risks of an artistic career and the limited availability of art training and resources in post-war Ireland. Hickey moved to Ireland in 1948 to study Italian, architecture, and history of art in University College Dublin (UCD).

He graduated from UCD's School of Architecture in 1954. He then went to Wicklow to work with Irish architect Micheal Scott, before starting to paint landscapes

Hickey won an Italian government scholarship to study etching and lithography at the Scuola del Libro, Urbino. As a result of the course, Hickey was able to pass on the skills he learnt in Urbino to other aspiring Irish artists like Anne Yeats or Liam Miller, who eventually supported his artistic career.

== Early career ==
Throughout the 1950s, 1960s and 1970s, Hickey gained renown as an artist, but he was better known for etching and lithography.[1]. He first exhibited his Wicklow landscapes in 1955 at the Irish Exhibition of Living Art.

Hickey co-founded the Graphic Studio in Dublin in 1960 with Anne Yeats, Elizabeth Rivers, Leslie MacWeeney and Liam Miller to address the lack of art education in Ireland. The studio was located at 18 Upper Mount St., Dublin. Although it was small, the studio contributed significantly to the growth of modern graphic art at the time in Ireland. Hickey remained a leading figure in the Graphic Studio up to 1970. Mary Farl Powers, an American print artist succeeded him.

During the 1960s, some of Hickey's most renowned prints included the "Stations of the Cross" (1965) and a collection of eighteen Inferno etchings that illustrate Dante's 'Divine Comedy' (1965). Hickey won second place in an Italian government competition held in honour of Dante's 700th birthday, for his collection of Divine Comedy etchings.

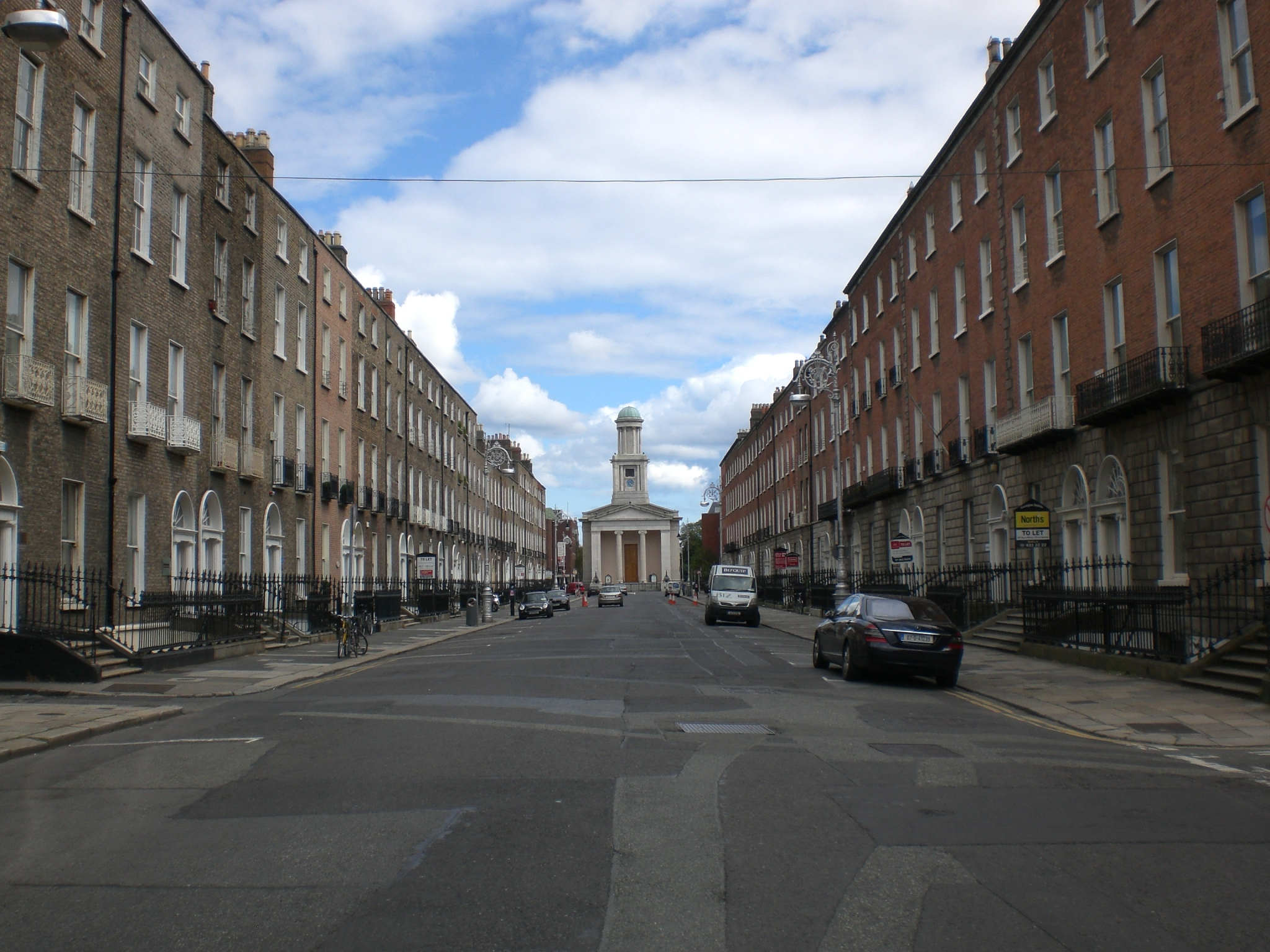
Mount Street, where the Graphic Studio founded by Hickey was located

In 1967 Hickey received a scholarship from the Norwegian government, where he paintedwatercolours. In this same year, he also designed a collection of postage stamps for the Irish government.

== Late career ==
=== Inspirations ===
Hickey's career took a turn after stepping down from his position as head of the Graphic Studio Gallery in Dublin. After visiting Corfu in 1975 he returned to Ireland to focus on new forms of work. He went on to create some of his most successful etching prints known as the "Months", which represented each month of the year in the form of a calendar. These works have often been compared to traditional Japanese artwork. Hickey wrote about his admiration of the Japanese spirit in his review of "Japanese Minor Arts of Netsuke and Inro", saying that he "painted like the Japanese even before he saw Japanese work." Additionally, Hickey's "Alphabet" (1988) and 'Aesop's Fables' (1990) series show the influence of Japanese works.

=== Achievements ===
In 1971, Hickey took part in the national Rosc exhibitions. He organised and exhibited eighteenth-century Irish delftware in Castletown House, County Kildare. Hickey believed that art education needed reform, so he joined the National College of Art and Design (NCAD);s board in May 1972. That same year, Hickey's first exhibit of "Bogland, Wicklow" was shown at the Royal Hibernian Academy (RHA) in Dublin. Hickey, alongside consulting engineer Sean Mulcahy and sculptor Michael Biggs, were selected by the Irish Central Bank to design a set of Irish banknotes for the treasury in 1972. In 1974, Hickey exhibited some of his etching works abroad for the first time at the Purdhoe Gallery in London.

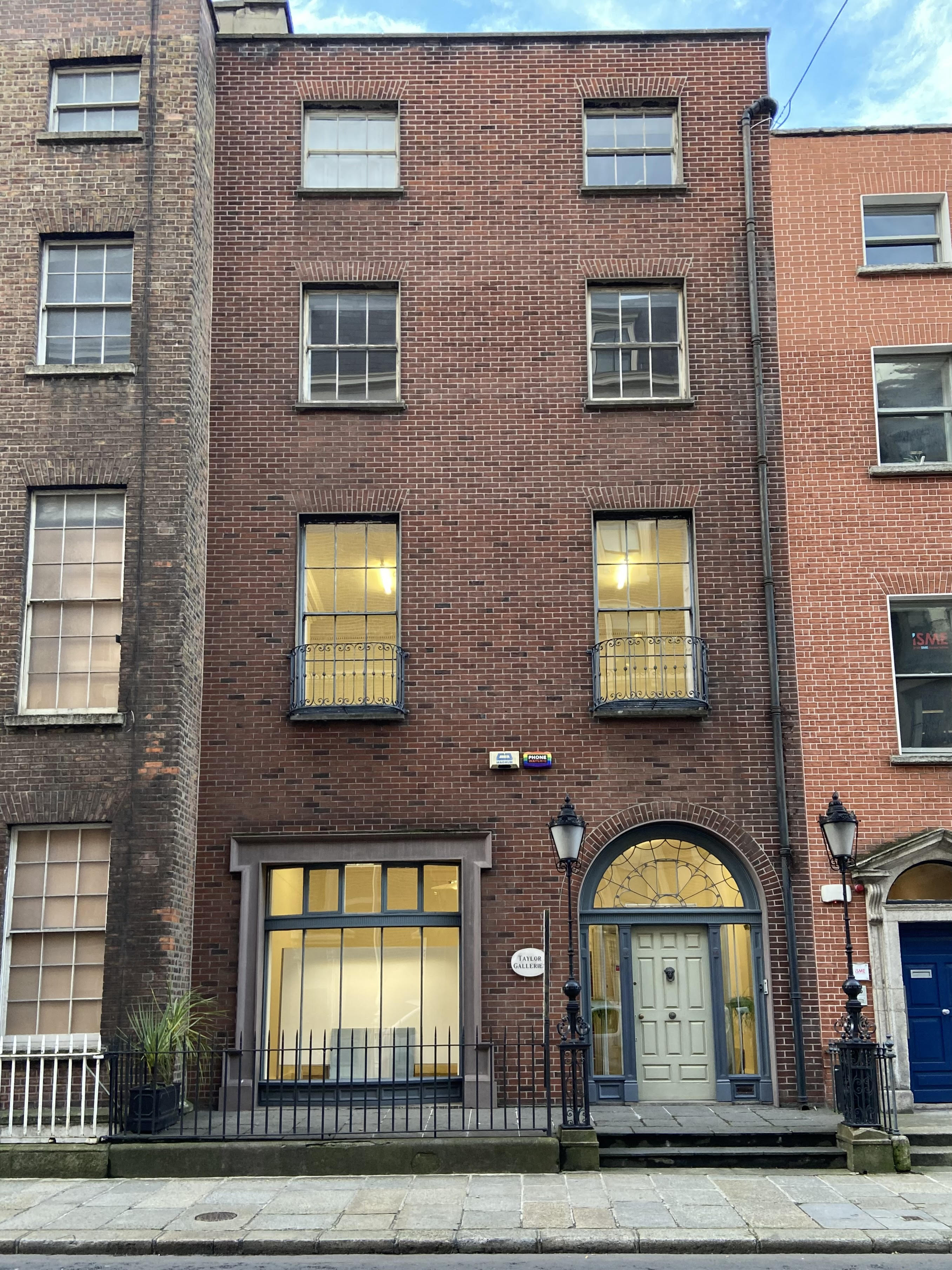
Front view of the Taylor Galleries located at number 17 Kildare Street in Dublin City, Ireland.

In 1980, RTÉ News reported Hickey's attendance at the National Gallery in Dublin to teach children about art. He wanted young people to visit the gallery and to see it as "a living place". He then exhibited his "Garden with Sago Palms Oil" on canvas in 1988 at the Taylor Galleries in Dublin. This would be one of the last exhibitions of his career. Hickey returned to teaching part-time in UCD at the School of Architecture, then later went on to be a professor at the NCAD in the late 1980s.

== Later life ==
In 1973 Hickey was diagnosed with Parkinson's disease. The Royal Institute of Architects of Ireland made him an honorary member in 1989. In 1986 Hickey also became Head of Painting at the National College of Art and Design's fine art faculty until 1990. His oil works, "Virginia Creeper" and "Garden Wall: Morning Wicklow Hillside" were exhibited. His work in the 1990s included two etchings, "Still Life with Pears and Apples" (1992) and 'The Fourth Tree (1993).' The Royal Institute of the Architects of Ireland held a retrospective exhibition of his work in 1994 which was followed by a show held in the Graphic Studio Gallery in 1995 of Hickeys etchings. Hickey had completed 27 pieces over the two and a half years prior.

There was a television documentary on RTE on 28 November 1996 called "Patrick Hickey Artist". Due to deteriorating health, he had to retire from teaching in the 1990s. In May 1997 he held his last exhibition at the Taylor Galleries in Kildare street in Dublin. This exhibition consisted of seventeen oil paintings, all of them landscapes or still lifes. The works included "Huguenot Cemetery" and 'Cat with Aubergines.' In 1997 Hickey moved from Mulgrave Terrace in Dun Laoghaire to nearby Clearwater Cove. The house in Mulgrave Terrace sold for €2 million. He gave the new owners of the house a painting of Japanese cherry trees.

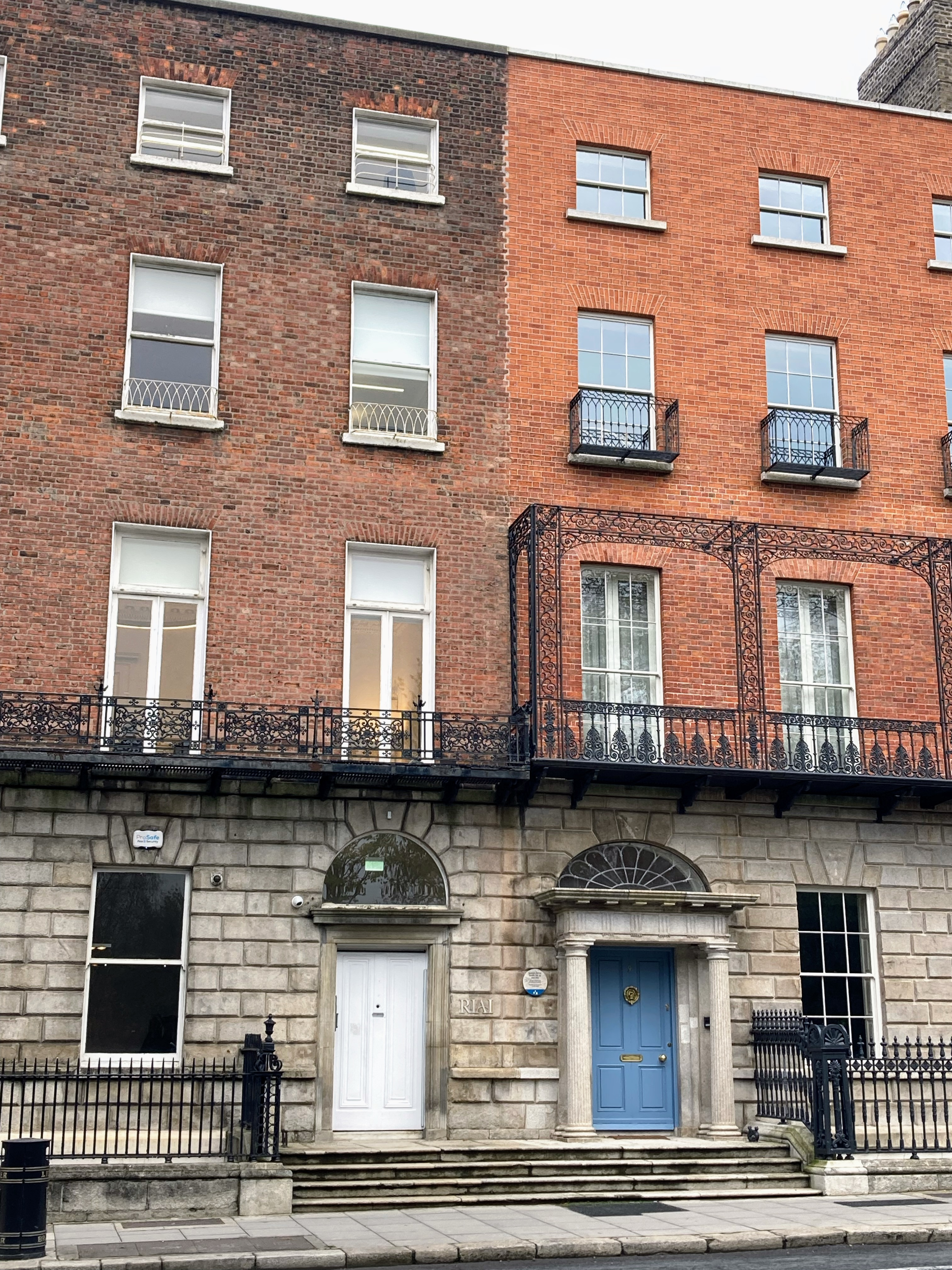
This is the Royal Institute of the Architects of Ireland where Hickey became an honorary member in 1989.

=== Death ===
Hickey died from Parkinson's disease on 16 October 1998 at home in Clearwater Cove, Monkstown with his wife Elizabeth ('Bizzie') Hickey, (née Hallinan) by his side. He was 71 years old. Hickey was cremated in Glasnevin Cemetery. In 2000, the Graphic studio gallery held an exhibition of Hickey's work, and a posthumous exhibition of his work was held in 2007 by the Dalkey Arts Centre.

== Legacy ==
According to his obituary in The Irish Times, Patrick Hickey "achieved so much with his life", including marriage, family, becoming a successful artist, architect and lecturer. Hickey's ideas about art and architecture have influenced the future of art in Ireland and elsewhere. According to an obituary in the Irish Independent, he was "a founder of modern art graphics in Ireland". Hickey had wanted to be a musician and he put musical notes in all the bank notes that he created. Following his death, Hickey's "techniques of etching and lithography and other graphic media" continued to be carried out in the Graphic Studio Dublin. The Graphic Studio Dublin held an exhibition in 2000 with Hickey's landscape prints from the 1970s. Hickey's art has been on sale at auction on invaluable.com since 2015. He left behind an extensive art collection. His art is portrayed in several galleries around Ireland, including the Arts Council of Ireland, Crawford Municipal Gallery, Cork; Hugh Lane Gallery, Dublin, Limerick City gallery of art; national self-portrait collection and University of Limerick. The UK Independent said after Hickey's death in 1998, that he had the most influence on art and design In Ireland compared to other artists.

Hickey left behind his wife and three children. One of his sons, Joby Hickey, also became an artist. As a child, Joby had appeared on the old 50 pound note that Hickey designed. Joby studied fine art in the Dun Laoghaire School of Art & Design, intending to study independently from his father. He later discovered that many of the teaching staff had previously been taught by his father, which underlined Patrick Hickey's influence on both the school and the broader Irish art scene.
