= Roderic O'Conor =

Irish painter

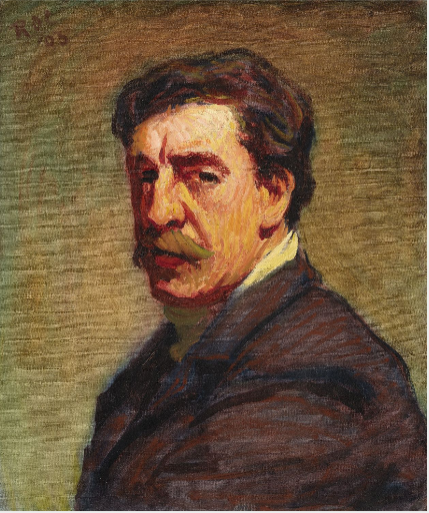
- Self-portrait (c. 1903)
- Born: 17 October 1860; Castleplunket, County Roscommon, Ireland
- Died: 18 March 1940 (aged 79); Nueil-sur-Layon, France
- Education: Metropolitan School of Art (Dublin), Royal Hibernian Academy (Dublin), Ampleforth College (Yorkshire), Académie Royale des Beaux-Arts (Antwerp)
- Known for: Painter, etcher

Roderic O'Conor (17 October 1860 – 18 March 1940) was an Irish painter who spent much of his later career in Paris and as part of the Pont-Aven movement. O'Conor's work demonstrates Impressionist and Post-Impressionist influence.

== Early life and training ==
Born in Milltown, Castleplunket, County Roscommon in Ireland, O'Conor attended the Metropolitan School and Royal Hibernian Academy early in his career. His father, Roderic Joseph O'Conor, acted as a justice of the peace and was appointed high sheriff of the county in 1863. His mother, Eleanor Mary, was brought up in a landowning family from County Meath. The family relocated to Dublin when O'Conor was still a child. He studied at Ampleforth College, and like his classmate, Richard Moynan, travelled to Antwerp before moving to Paris to gain further experience. While in France, he was influenced by the Impressionists.

== Works ==
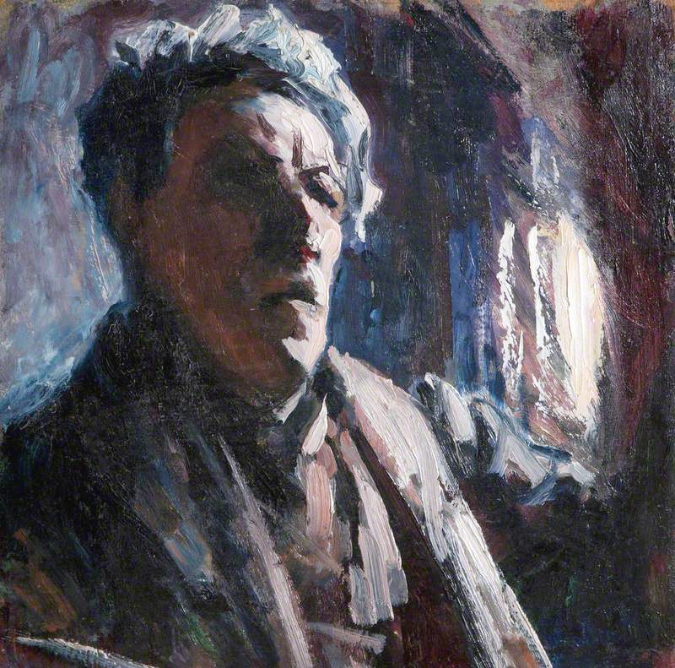
Self-portrait c. 1923–1926

In 1892, O'Conor went to Pont-Aven in Brittany where he worked closely with a group of artists around the Post-Impressionist Paul Gauguin, whom he befriended. His method of painting with textured strokes of contrasting colours also owed much to Van Gogh.

== Relationship with Somerset Maugham ==
In the early twentieth century, O'Conor was one of a group of painters, writers and intellectuals who frequented the Chat Blanc, a restaurant in the rue d'Odessa near the Gare Montparnasse in Paris, a group that included Gerald Kelly, Aleister Crowley and the young Somerset Maugham. O'Conor "took an immediate dislike to Maugham, who later recalled that his presence at the table seemed to irritate the Irishman and he had only to venture a remark to have O'Conor attack it." Maugham had his revenge on O'Conor by using him as the basis for two fictional characters, O'Brien in The Magician and Clutton in Of Human Bondage. Both portraits are unflattering: O'Brien is "a failure whose bitterness has warped his soul so that, unforgiving of the success of others, he lashes out at any artist of talent", while Clutton is "a sardonic painter who is most cheerful when he can find a victim for his sarcasm". However, it was through O'Conor that Maugham first became interested in Gauguin (Maugham travelled to Tahiti and based his novel The Moon and Sixpence on the life of Gauguin).

== Personal life and legacy ==
In 1933, O'Conor married his partner Henrietta (Renée) Honta, who had sometimes modelled for him. The couple lived in France and Spain, until O'Conor's death at their home in France. He died in Nueil-sur-Layon, France on 18 March 1940.

In March 2011, a work by O'Conor sold for £337,250 (€383,993). Landscape, Cassis, an oil-on-canvas, was painted by O'Conor in the south of France in 1913 and sold at Sotheby's for significantly higher than the estimated price.

== Works in collections ==
- Auckland Art Gallery
- Ulster Museum, Belfast
- Art Institute of Chicago
- Hugh Lane Gallery of Modern Art, Dublin
- National Gallery of Ireland, Dublin
- Scottish National Gallery of Modern Art, Edinburgh
- Indianapolis Museum of Art
- Hunt Museum, Limerick
- Tate Britain, London
- Museum of Modern Art, New York
- Musée d’Orsay, Paris
- Musée des Beaux-Arts de Pont-Aven
- Art Gallery of New South Wales, Sydney
- Te Papa, Wellington

== Gallery ==
Works by Roderic O'Connor

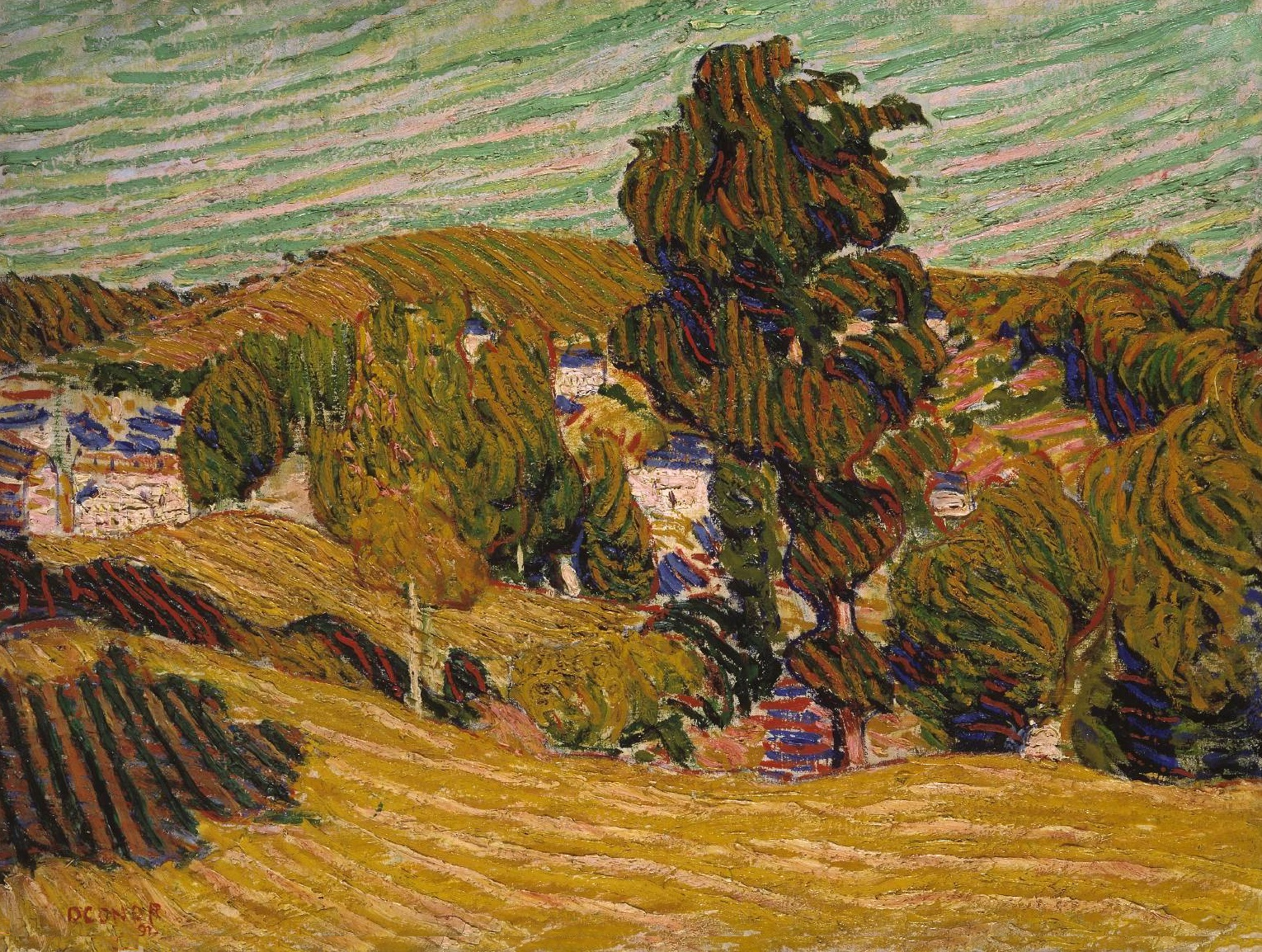
Yellow landscape, 1892 (The Tate, London)

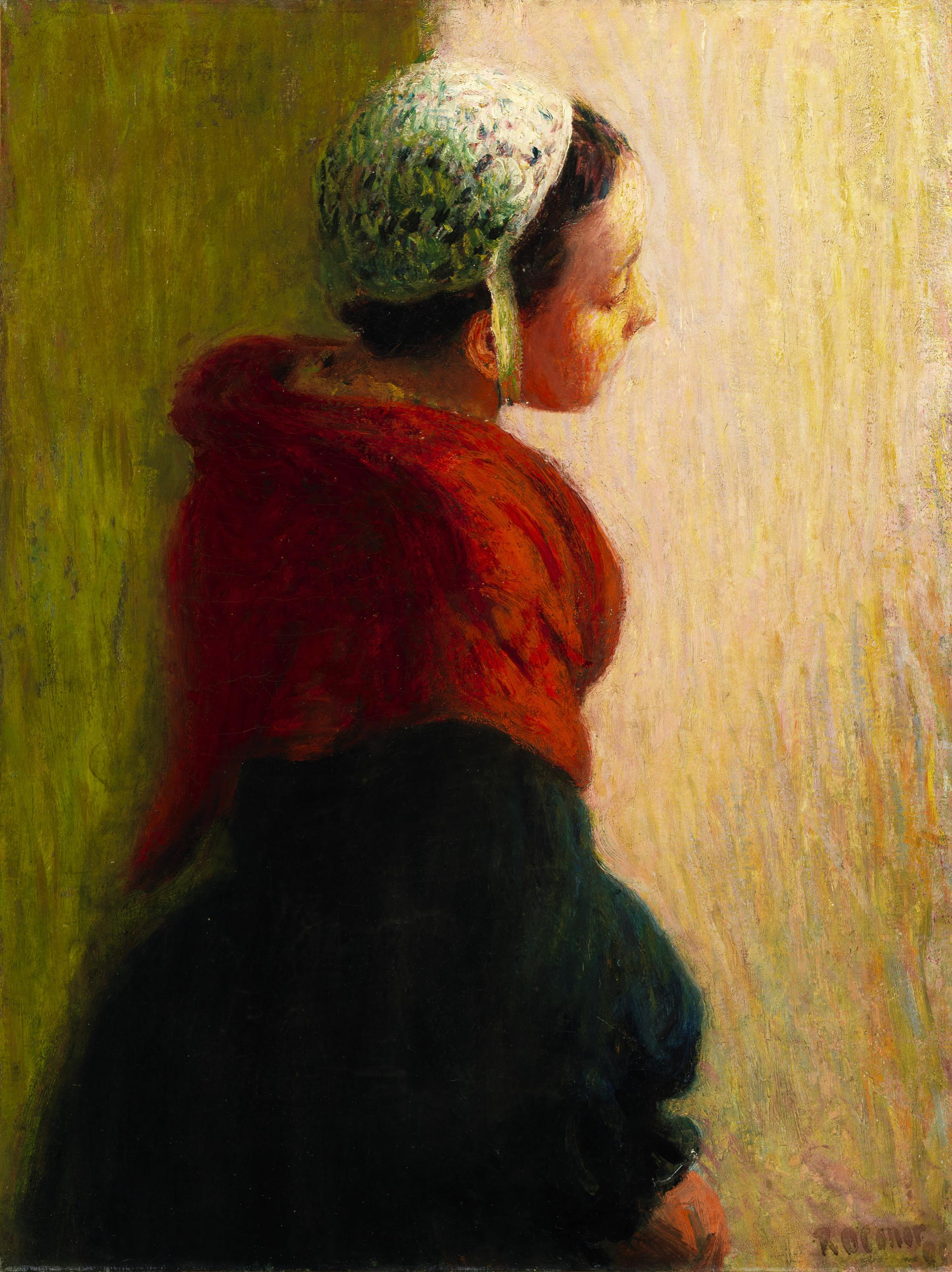
La Jeune Bretonne, 1895 (National Gallery, Dublin)

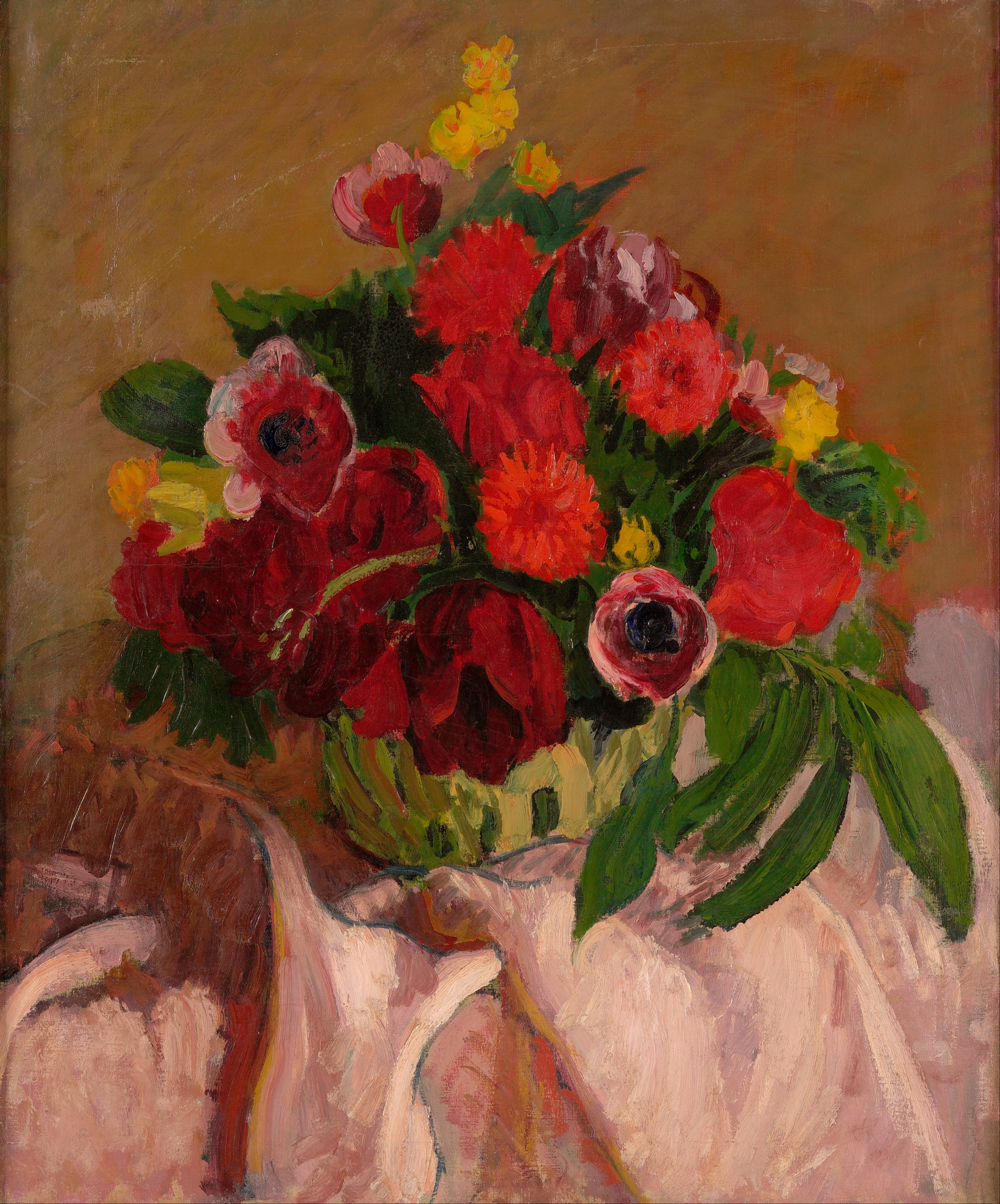
Mixed flowers on pink cloth, c. 1916 (Te Papa, Wellington)

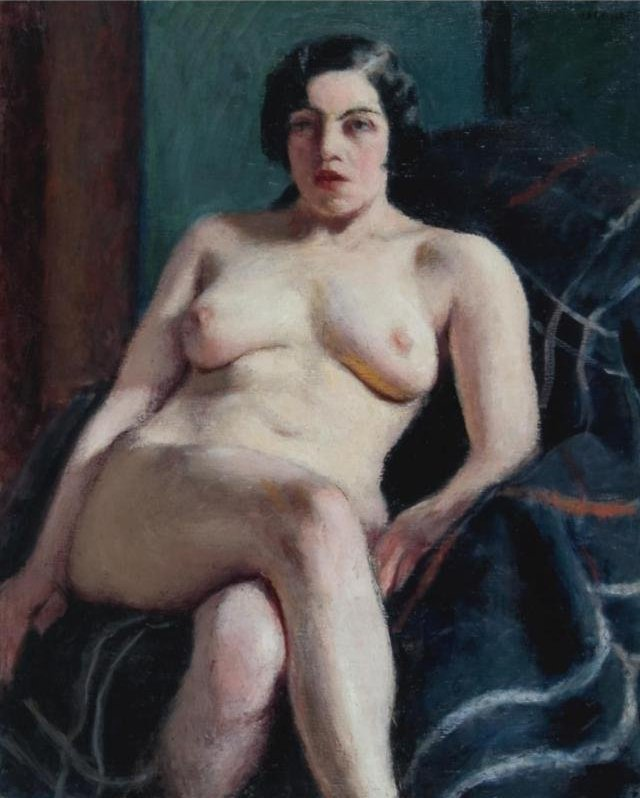
Nude seated on a green rug, circa 1925

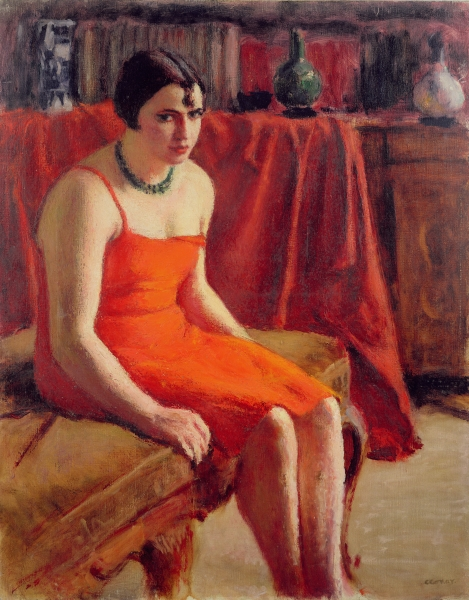
Seated woman in a red dress, circa 1920

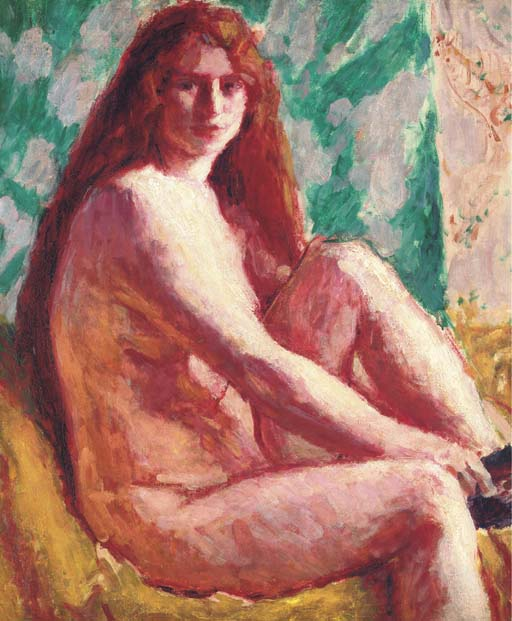
Seated nude with red hair, circa 1900

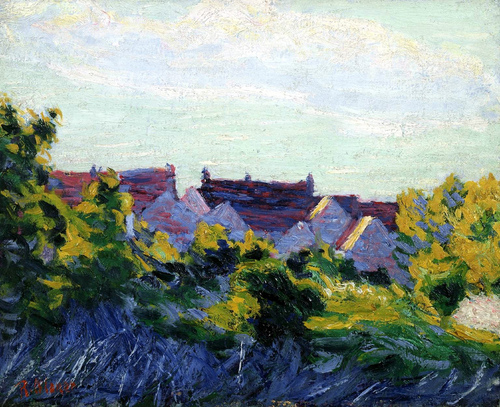
Pont aven, circa 1895

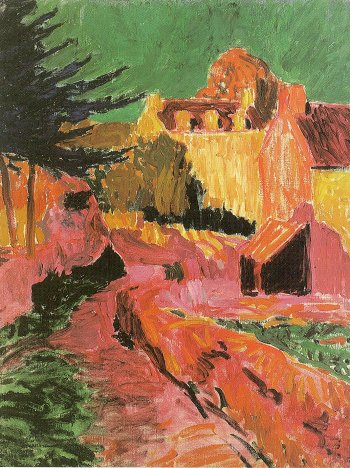
Lezaven, circa 1894

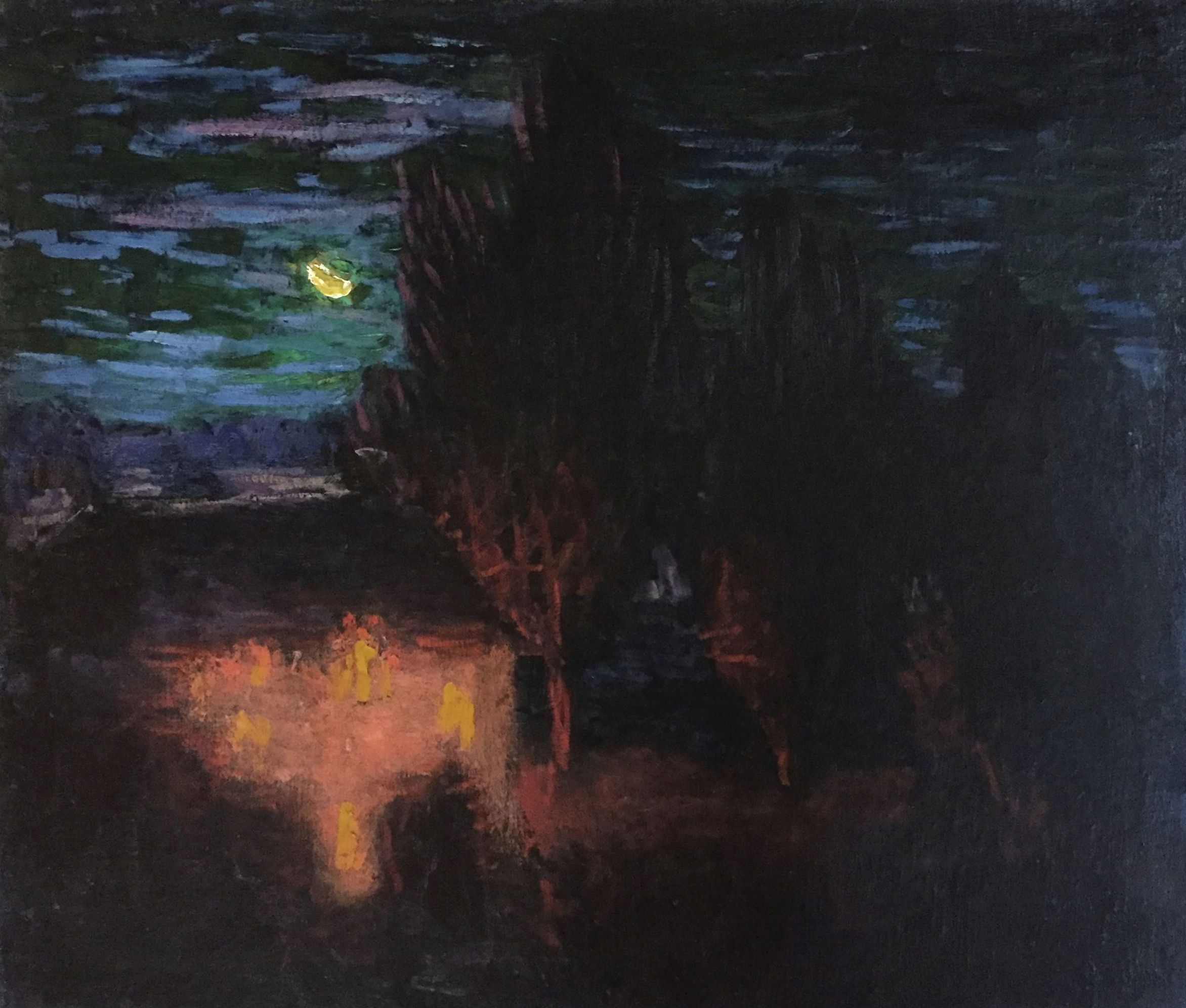
"Les Korrigans sous la lune - The dance of the elves of Pont-Aven" (Moonlit landscape with tall trees) by Roderic O'Conor, ca. 1898-1900
