= Fergus Feehily =

Fergus Feehily (born 1968) is an Irish artist.

Feehily was born in Dublin the youngest of five children. He studied at Dún Laoghaire College of Art and Design (now known as Dún Laoghaire Institute of Art, Design and Technology). In the late 1990s he received the Monbusho Scholarship from the Japanese Ministry of Education to study at Tokyo National University of Fine Arts and Music.

Feehily is represented by MISAKO & ROSEN, Tokyo and Galerie Christian Lethert, Cologne. His work is included in the collections of both the Irish Museum of Modern Art and The Arts Council of Ireland.
