= List of Irish artists =

This list of Irish artists includes notable visual artists born or working mainly in Ireland along with a list of critics, collectors and curators who have had an influence on Irish visual arts.

== A ==
- Kevin Abosch (born 1969) – artist
- Henry Allan (1865–1912) – painter
- Margaret Allen (1830–1914) – portrait and genre painter
- Mabel Annesley (1881–1959) – Anglo-Irish watercolourist and wood engraver
- William Ashford (1746–1824) – British painter who worked exclusively in Ireland

== B ==
- Francis Bacon (1909–1992) – Irish painter
- Robert Ballagh (born 1943) – artist
- Robert Barker (1739–1806) – painter from Kells
- George Barret, Sr. (1728–1784) – landscape artist, especially of portraits of the British countryside
- James Barry (1741–1806)
- William Gerard Barry (1864–1941) – painter
- Rose Maynard Barton (1856–1929)
- Mary Battersby (fl. 1801–1841)
- Richard Brydges Beechey (1808–1895) – Anglo-Irish painter and Admiral in the Royal Navy
- John Behan (born 1938) – sculptor
- Shane Berkery (born 1992)
- Pauline Bewick (born 1935) – artist
- Renée Bickerstaff (1904–1983) – founding member & treasurer of the Ulster Society of Women Artists, & honorary secretary of the Royal Ulster Academy of Arts
- Francis Bindon (1690–1765)
- Basil Blackshaw (1932–2016) – painter, especially of rural scenes with greyhounds, Irish Travellers and the landscape
- Brian Bourke (born 1936) – artist and winner of the Arts Council of Ireland award for portraiture
- Alicia Boyle (1908–1997) – abstract landscapes
- John Boyne (1750–1810)
- Charles Brady (1926–1997) – New York-born painter who spent most of his life in Ireland
- James Brenan (1837–1907) – artist
- Gordon Brewster (1889–1946) – cartoonist
- Deborah Brown (born 1927) – painting and sculpture
- Vincent Browne (born 1947) – sculptor
- Colleen Browning (1918–2003) – realist painter
- Adam Buck (1759–1833)
- Augustus Nicholas Burke (1838–1891) – artist and a member of the Royal Hibernian Academy
- John Burke (1946–2006) – sculptor
- Thomas Burke (1749–1815) – engraver and painter
- Frederick William Burton (1816–1900) – painter born in Corofin, County Clare
- Mildred Anne Butler (1885–1941) – painter
- John Butts (c. 1728 – 1764)
- John Byrne – contemporary artist
- Gerard Byrne (born 1958) – figurative painter and en plein air landscape painter
- Gerard Byrne (born 1969) – installation artist

== C ==
- Niccolo d'Ardia Caracciolo (1941–1989) – painter
- Robert Carver (c. 1730 – 1791) – painter of theatre scenery and framed works
- John Cassidy (1860–1939) – sculptor and painter
- Anna Cheyne (1926–2002) –sculptor and painter
- Alfred E. Child (1875–1939) – stained glass artist
- Harry Clarke (1889–1931) – stained glass artist and book illustrator
- Anne Cleary (born 1965) – installation and video artist
- Egerton Coghill (1853–1921) – painter, especially of landscapes of County Cork
- James Coleman (born 1941) – installation and video artist
- Simon Coleman (1916–1995) – portrait and landscape painter
- Charles Collins (c. 1680 – 1744) – painter, especially of animals and still-life
- Patrick Collins (1910–1994) – painter
- Fred Conlon (1943–2005) – sculptor
- Denis Connolly (born 1965) – installation and video artist
- William Conor (1881–1968)
- Amanda Coogan (born 1971) – performance artist
- Barrie Cooke (1931–2014) – abstract expressionist painter
- Erin Corr (1793–1862) – engraver
- Gary Coyle (born 1965)
- James Humbert Craig (1878–1944)
- Martin Cregan (1788–1870)
- Frances Emilia Crofton (1822–1910) – landscape artist
- Dorothy Cross (born 1956) – artist working in a range of media from sculpture to video
- William Crozier (1930–2011) – Irish-Scots still-life and landscape artist
- Amelia Curran (1775–1847) – portrait painter

== D ==
- Francis Danby (1793–1861) – painter, especially of large pictures in oil
- Colin Davidson (born 1968) – artist
- Gerald Davis (1938–2005)
- William Davis (1812–1873) – artist influenced by the Pre-Raphaelite style of painting
- Niall de Buitléar (born 1983)
- Mary Eily de Putron (1914–1982) – Irish and Guernsey stained glass artist and archaeologist
- Edward Delaney (1930–2009) – sculptor born in Claremorris
- Vivienne Dick (born 1950) – experimental filmmaker
- Gerald Dillon (1916–1971) – painter
- Anne Donnelly (born 1932) – artist
- Willie Doherty (born 1959) – artist mainly in photography and video
- Keith Drury (artist) (born 1964) – oil painter and 3D digital artist
- Susanna Drury (1698–1770) – landscape painter
- Patrick Vincent Duffy (1836–1909) – painter, primarily of landscapes
- Rita Duffy (born 1959) – painter

== E ==
- Ross Eccles (born 1937) – contemporary artist, English-born but based in Ireland since 1971
- Felim Egan (born 1952) – painter
- Frank Egginton (1908–1990) – contemporary painter
- Alfred Elmore (1815–1881) – Victorian history and genre painter
- Beatrice Elvery (1881–1970) – stained-glass artist and painter

== F ==
- Robert Fagan (1761–1816) – painter, diplomat and archaeologist
- Gary Farrelly (born 1983) – artist and a founder of the Defastenist art group
- Fergus Feehily (born 1968) – artist
- Genieve Figgis (born 1972) – contemporary painter
- Jonathan Fisher (fl. 1763–1809) – painter, engraver, and printmaker of aquatints of Irish scenery
- Mary Fitzgerald (born 1956) – member of Aosdana, lives and works in Dublin and Co. Waterford
- Jim Fitzpatrick (born 1944) – artist, especially of Irish Celtic art
- T.P. Flanagan (1929–2011) – landscapes
- John Henry Foley (1818–1874) – sculptor
- Gerda Frömel (1931–1975) – sculptor
- Stanhope Alexander Forbes (1857–1947) – artist and member of the Newlyn school of painters
- Graham Forsythe (born 1952) – painter
- Brian Frances (1933–2005) – landscape painter
- Hugh Frazer (1795–1865) – painter
- William Percy French (1854–1920) – songwriter, entertainer, watercolour painter

== G ==
- Norman Garstin (1847–1926) – artist with the Newlyn School of painters
- Edmund Garvey (1740–1813) – painter
- Wilhelmina Geddes (1887–1955) – stained glass artist
- Millicent Girling (1900–1993) – designer and illustrator
- William St. John Glenn (1904–1974)
- William Robert Gordon (1872–1955) – landscapes, founding member of the Ulster Arts Club and the Ulster Literary Theatre
- Eileen Gray (1879–1976) – furniture designer and architect
- Anita Groener (born 1958) – artist and Aosdána member
- Nathaniel Grogan (1740–1807) – painter from Cork

== H ==
- Willem Van der Hagen (unknown–1745) – Dutch-born landscape painter who settled in Ireland
- Ronan Halpin (born 1958) – sculptor living on Achill Island, works in steel and bronze
- Eva Henrietta Hamilton (1876–1960)
- Hugh Douglas Hamilton (c.1739–1808)
- Alice Berger Hammerschlag (1917–1969)
- James Hanley (born 1965)
- Marie Hanlon (born 1948) – artist and Aosdána member
- Alice Hanratty (born 1939) – printmaker
- William Michael Harnett (1848–1892) – Irish-American painter who used a trompe-l'œil style of painting
- Conor Harrington (born 1980) – Irish-born street artist based in London
- William Harrington (Artist) (born 1941) – Irish artist noted for his drawings of Cork city people and streetscapes
- Gertrude Hartland (1865–1954) – illustrator
- Henry Albert Hartland (1840–1893) – illustrator and built theatrical scenery
- Joseph Patrick Haverty (1794–1864) – painter
- Edwin Hayes (1819–1904) – painter of naval and marine seascapes/landscapes
- Gabriel Hayes (1909–1978) – artist and currency designer
- Michael Healy (1873–1941) – stained glass artist
- Gottfried Helnwein (born 1948) – Austrian painter, photographer, installation and performance artist
- Mercedes Helnwein (born 1979) – fine artist, writer, and video artist
- Jeremy Henderson (1952–2009) – artist and painter
- Patrick Hennessy (1915–1980) – realist painter
- William John Hennessy (1839–1917) – wood carving and watercolor artist
- Olive Henry (1902–1989) – painting, photography and stained glass artist
- Paul Henry (1876–1958) – landscape painter
- Mary Balfour Herbert (1817–1893) – watercolour artist, especially scenes from the Lakes of Killarney
- Christopher Hewetson (1739–1799) – sculptor
- Thomas Hickey (1741–1824) – painter
- Derek Hill (1916–2000) – English-born portrait and landscape painter in Ireland
- Nathaniel Hill (1861–1934) – impressionist
- Sean Hillen (born 1961) – artist, especially of collages and the creative use of photographs
- Nuala Holloway (born c. 1956) – painter
- Katie Holten (born 1975) – artist of drawings, installations, sculptures, and public art projects
- Evie Hone (1894–1955) – painter and stained glass artist
- Nathaniel Hone the Elder (1718–1784) – portrait and miniature painter
- Nathaniel Hone the Younger (1831–1917) – painter
- Thomas Hovenden (1840–1895) – Irish-American artist, teacher, and painter, especially of realistic quiet family scenes and narrative subjects
- Mercy Hunter (1910–1989) – painter, calligrapher and teacher
- Robert Hunter (fl. 1752–1803)
- Philip Hussey (c. 1713 – 1783) – portraitist and interiors painter

== I ==
- Charles Cromwell Ingham (1796–1863) – portrait painter
- Patrick Ireland/Brian O'Doherty (born 1928) – sculptor, conceptual artist, and installation artist
- Jaki Irvine (born 1966) – contemporary artist

== J ==
- Mainie Jellett (1897–1944) – abstract painter and founder of the Irish Exhibition of Living Art
- Charles Jervas (1675–1739) – portrait painter, translator, and art collector
- George W. Joy (1845–1925) – painter
- Rachel Joynt (born 1966) – sculptor

== K ==
- Paul Kane (1810–1871)
- Joseph Malachy Kavanagh (1856–1918)
- Seán Keating (1889–1977)
- Oisín Kelly (1915–1981)
- Harry Kernoff (1900–1974)
- John Kindness (born 1951)
- Cecil King (1921–1986)
- Kenneth King (1939–2019)
- Marion King (1897–1963)
- John Kingerlee (born 1936)
- Vera Klute (born 1981) - contemporary artist
- Graham Knuttel (born 1954)
- Georgina Moutray Kyle (1865–1950) – watercolour and pastels

== L ==
- Charles Lamb (1893–1964) – portraits and landscape painter
- Deborah Lambkin (born 1970)
- Grania Langrishe (born 1934)
- Diarmuid Larkin (1918–1989)
- Seán Larkin (born 1949) – art curator and educationist
- James Latham (c. 1696 – 1747)
- John Lavery (1856–1941)
- Louis le Brocquy (1916–2012)
- William John Leech (1861–1968)
- James Le Jeune (1910–1983) – portraits and landscapes
- Ciaran Lennon, aka Lennon (born 1947)
- John Luke (1906–1975)
- Sean Lynch (born 1978) – contemporary artist
- Clíodhna Lyons – Irish cartoonist

== M ==
- Gladys Maccabe (1918–2018)
- George Galway MacCann (1909–1967) – sculpture, painting
- Patrick MacDowell (1799–1870)
- Micheál MacLiammóir (1899–1978)
- Daniel Maclise (1806–1870)
- Henry MacManus (c. 1810 – 1878)
- Anne Madden (born 1932)
- Cecil Maguire (1930–2020) – painter
- Alice Maher (born 1956)
- Padraig Marrinan (1906–1975)
- Fergus Martin (born 1955)
- Violet McAdoo (1900–1961)
- James McArdell (fl. 1728–1765)
- Charles McAuley (1900–1999)
- Niamh McCann (born 1971)
- Sheila McClean (1932–2016)
- Samuel McCloy (1831–1904)
- Bryan McCormack (born 1972)
- Niall McCormack (born 1960)
- Siobhan McDonald
- Norah McGuinness (1903–1980)
- Yvonne McGuinness (born 1972)
- Edward McGuire (1932–1986)
- Frank McKelvey (1895–1974)
- Cherith McKinstry (1928–1904)
- Aloysius McVeigh (1923–2008)
- Colin Middleton (1910–1983)
- Nick Miller (born 1962) – London-born artist, painter, member of Aosdána
- John Minihan (born 1946)
- Crawford Mitchell (1908–1976) – wood-engraving, linocuts
- Flora Mitchell (1890–1973)
- Martin Mooney (born 1970)
- Garret Morphey (c. 1650 – 1716)
- George Morrison (1915–1993) – landscape painter and a founding member of the Ulster Watercolour Society
- Albert Morrow (1863–1927) – illustrator, poster designer and cartoonist
- Jack Morrow (1872–1926) – political cartoonist, illustrator and landscape painter
- Richard Mosse (born 1980) – conceptual documentary photographer and video artist
- Richard Moynan (1856–1906)
- Michael Mulcahy (born 1952)
- Janet Mullarney (1952–2020) – sculptor
- George Mullins (fl. 1763–65)
- William Mulready (1786–1863)
- Bernard Mulrenin (1803–1868)
- George Francis Mulvany (1809–1869)

== N ==
- Charles Wynne Nicholls (1831–1903)
- Paul Nietsche (1885–1950) – portraits and still-life
- Finbarr Notte (professionally known as Fin DAC) – murals and canvas work

== O ==
- Dermod O'Brien (1865–1945) – landscape and portrait painter
- John O'Brien (1831–1891) – Irish-born Canadian marine artist
- James Arthur O'Connor (1792–1841) – painter
- John O'Connor (1830–1889) – painter
- Roderic O'Conor (1860–1940) – painter influenced by Impressionism
- Micheál OʼConnell / Mocksim - technology artist
- Éamonn O'Doherty (1939–2011) – sculptor
- John O'Keeffe (c. 1797 – 1838) – portrait and figure painter
- Aloysius O'Kelly (1853 – c. 1941) – painter of coastlines, fishing ports and villages
- Tony O'Malley (1913–2003) – self-taught painter
- Frank O'Meara (1853–1888) – painter
- Daniel O'Neill (1920–1974) – Romantic painter born in Belfast
- George Bernard O'Neill (1828–1917) – paintings and etchings
- Henry O'Neill (1798–1880) – artist and archaeologist
- William Orpen (1878–1931) – portrait painter
- Dennis H Osborne (1919–2016) – painter
- Jean Osborne (1926–1965) – abstract paintings and graphic designer
- Walter Osborne (1859–1903) – impressionist painter
- Seán O'Sullivan (1906–1964) – portrait painter
- Rory O'Tunny (fl. 1540s) – sculptor

== P ==
- Colin Pennock (born 1964) – painter
- George Petrie (1790–1866) – painter, musician, antiquary and archaeologist
- Stanley Pettigrew (born 1927) – painter
- Garrett Phelan (born 1965) – installation artist
- Raymond Piper (1923–2007) – portraiture and illustration
- Albert Power (1881–1945) – sculptor
- Mary Farl Powers (1948–1992) – graphic artist
- Rosamond Praeger (1867–1954) – sculptor, illustrator, poet and writer
- Graeme Purdy (born 1971) – photographer and author
- Sarah Purser (1848–1943) – artist often working in stained glass
- Stephen Pusey (born 1952) – mural painter
- Patrick Pye (1929–2018) – sculptor, painter and stained glass artist; resident in County Dublin

== R ==
- Basil Rakoczi (1908–1979) – artist and member of The White Stag group
- John Ramage (1748–1802) – Irish American artist, goldsmith, portrait painter, and miniaturist
- Eileen Reid (1894–1981) – painter
- Nano Reid (1900–1981) – painter
- Ethel Rhind (1877–1952) – stained glass artist
- Jim Ricks (born 1973) – contemporary artist
- Anne Rigney (born 1957) – abstract artist and sculptor
- Thomas Roberts (1749–1778) – landscape painter
- Maria D. Robinson (1840–1920) – painter
- Markey Robinson (1918–1999) – painter with a distinctive naïve expressionist style
- Richard Rothwell (1800–1868) – portrait and genre painter
- John Ryan (1925–1992) – artist, writer, critic, publisher, patron, broadcaster and publican

== S ==
- William Sadler II (c. 1782 – 1839) – landscape painter
- Augustus Saint-Gaudens (1848–1907) – Irish-born American sculptor of the Beaux-Arts generation
- Caroline Scally (1886–1973) – Irish landscape artist
- Robert Richard Scanlan (1801–1876) – painter and portraitist
- Patrick Scott (1921–2014) – artist
- Sean Scully (born 1945) – Irish-born American painter and printmaker
- Paul Seawright (born 1965) – artist and professor of photography at the University of Ulster
- Dermot Seymour (Born 1956) – painter
- Kevin Sharkey (born 1960) – painter and celebrity
- Neil Shawcross (born 1940) – portrait painter
- Sir Martin Archer Shee (1769–1850) – Dublin-born portrait painter and president of the Royal Academy
- Oliver Sheppard (1865–1941) – sculptor and lecturer
- John Shinnors (born 1950) – abstract painter
- James Sleator (1889–1950) – artist
- Bob Sloan (born 1940) – sculptor
- Hamilton Sloan (born 1945) – portrait painter and traditional Irish artist
- Victor Sloan (born 1945) – photographer and artist
- Edward Smyth (1749–1812) – sculptor
- Holly Somerville – botanical artist
- Camille Souter (born 1929) – painter
- Stella Steyn (1907–1987)
- Imogen Stuart (born 1927) – Berlin-born sculptor
- Patrick Swift (1927–1983)

== T ==
- Henry Jones Thaddeus (1859–1929) – realist and portrait painter
- Romeo Toogood (1902–1966) – landscape painter
- Henry Tresham (1750–1814) – Irish-born painter of large-scale history paintings
- Patrick Tuohy (1894–1930) – portrait, narrative, and genre painter
- Charles Tyrrell (born 1950) – abstract painter and printmaker

== W ==
- J. Laurie Wallace (1864–1953) – artist
- Ciarán Walsh (born 1980) – artist
- Owen Walsh (1933–2002) – painter
- Samuel Walsh (born 1951) – contemporary abstract artist
- Wendy F. Walsh (1915–2014) – illustrator and botanical artist
- Eimear Walshe - artist and activist
- Michael Warren (born 1950) – sculptor
- Una Watters (1918–1965) – artist
- Josephine Webb (1853–1924) – portrait and landscape painter
- Robert West (died 1770) – painter
- Leo Whelan (1852–1956) – painter
- Maurice Canning Wilks (1911–1984)
- Alexander Williams (1845–1930) – landscape painter, maritime scenes
- William Gorman Wills (1828–1891) – dramatist and painter

== Y ==
- Anne Yeats (1919–2001) – painter and stage designer
- Jack Yeats (1871–1957) – artist
- John Butler Yeats (1839–1922) – artist

== Critics, collectors and curators ==
- Alfred Chester Beatty (1875–1968)
- Alfred Lane Beit (1903–1994)
- Thomas Bodkin (1887–1961)
- Anne Crookshank (1927–2016)
- William Dargan (1799–1867)
- Desmond John Villiers FitzGerald, Knight of Glin (1937–2011)
- Cathal Gannon (1910–1999)
- Bryan Guinness (1905–1992)
- John Hewitt (1907–1987)
- Gordon Lambert (1919–2005)
- Hugh Lane (1875–1915)
- Denis Mahon (1910–2011)
- Lochlann Quinn (born 1940)
- Æ (George William Russell) (1867–1935)
- Tony Ryan (1936–2007)
- George Bernard Shaw (1856–1950)
- Theo Snoddy (1922–2008)
- Walter G. Strickland (1850–1928)
- Dorothy Walker (1929–2002)

== See also ==
- List of Irish botanical illustrators
- Irish art
- List of Northern Irish artists
