= Kathleen Isabella Mackie =

Irish painter and glider pilot

Kathleen Isabella Mackie ARUA
- Born: Kathleen Isabella Metcalfe; 22 July 1899; Knock, Belfast
- Died: 8 May 1996 (aged 96); Toye, County Down, Northern Ireland
- Education: Belfast School of Art
- Alma mater: Royal Academy School
- Known for: Painting, gliding
- Spouse: Jack Mackie

Kathleen Isabella Mackie ARUA (22 July 1899 – 8 May 1996) was a painter and an elected Associate of the Ulster Academy of Arts and exhibitor at the Paris Salon. She was a founding member of the Ulster Gliding Club and a friend of pioneering aviator Amy Johnson.

== Biography ==
Born Kathleen Isabella Metcalfe in Knock, Belfast, Ireland in 1899, she was the eldest of three children to Arthur Metcalfe and Phoebe Pringle. Mackie attended Richmond Lodge, Belfast, and attended Highcliffe School outside Scarborough for a year before going on to study at Alexandra College, Dublin from 1916 to 1919. In her first year at Alexandra College she came joint first in a competition judged by Sarah Purser and Richard Caulfield Orpen in the Lady Ardilaun Exhibition. She was also selected to design World War I fundraising posters, which were then displayed in Amiens Street Station.

Mackie then returned to Belfast where she took private lessons with Jessie Douglas at Garfield Chambers on Royal Avenue. She entered Belfast School of Art under Alfred Rawlings Baker in 1921 where she remained for two years. Rawlings introduced her to John Lavery, doyen of the Belfast art scene, and after joining her neighbour Joseph Carey's 1910 Sketching Club, she met Frank McKelvey and Percy French amongst many others.

She enjoyed continued success when she won a prize in 1921 in the Royal Dublin Society's Taylor Art Awards which allowed her entry to the Royal Academy Schools in London. The following year Mackie won both the Taylor Award and a British scholarship, which she was to retain for a further two years. In London Mackie worked under William Orpen, Walter Sickert, George Clausen and Sir Gerald Kelly. In 1924 Mackie was selected to show alongside John Lavery, Frank McKelvey and Paul Henry at the British Empire Exhibition at Wembley. At the end of 1924 Mackie transferred her remaining scholarship to return to Belfast School of Art, when she also established her own studio in Garfield Chambers. Mackie's student work The Market represented her at the 1925 Paris Salon and was later presented to the Ulster Academy of Arts as her diploma work.

From 1922 until 1947 she showed with the Watercolour Society of Ireland upon the encouragement of Eileen Reid, and was also to exhibit less frequently with the Royal Academy and the Royal Hibernian Academy.

After marrying her cousin, the owner of Mackies engineering works in April 1926 with whom she had three sons, her work slowed and yet she still submitted work for exhibition, and she became an Associate of the Ulster Academy of Arts in 1936 where she exhibited more than sixty paintings over 39 years until 1959. She supported her husband's work for ex-servicemen's charities which gained him a CBE, as well as local causes such as her place on the hospital committee.

Mackie was a forgotten artist for many years having not exhibited works for around twenty-five years until a chance discovery by her son Paddy when he entered an apple loft at his Mother's home. This find resulted in Mackie's first solo exhibition at the Castle Espie Gallery, Comber at the age of 86. The Ulster Museum hosted a major retrospective of her work just a few weeks before her death, although she was unable to attend due to illness.

Mackie was also a keen sailor, angler and skier who took up gliding in 1927 and with her husband was a founding member of the Ulster Gliding Club. She maintained a friendship with Amy Johnson after her visit to the Ulster Gliding Club in 1938, and continued to fly until she was in her late seventies. Mackie died in at her home in County Down in 1996. She was survived by her son and several grandchildren and great-grandchildren. Her works can be found in many private collections and in the diploma collection of the Royal Ulster Academy of Arts.
