= Ronan Walsh =

Irish conceptual artist

- Born: 15 May 1958 (age 68); Dublin, Ireland
- Education: National College of Art and Design
- Known for: Painter, graphic artist, photographer
- Movement: Abstract expressionism, expressionism

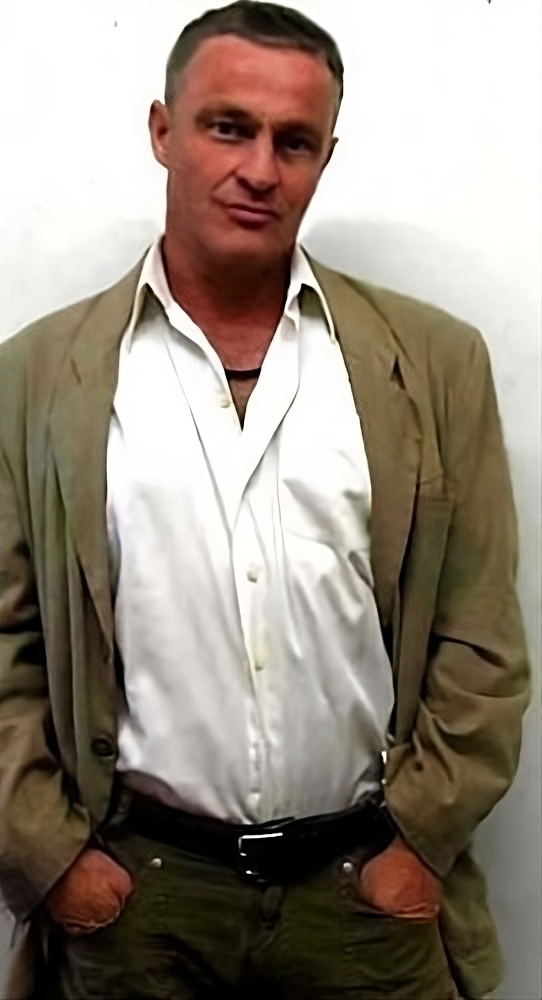
Ronan Walsh Irish contemporary Artist and Painter

Ronan Walsh (born 15 May 1958) is a Dublin-born Irish artist who represented Ireland at the 1988 Art Junction in Nice and has exhibited work throughout Europe and North America.

== Life ==
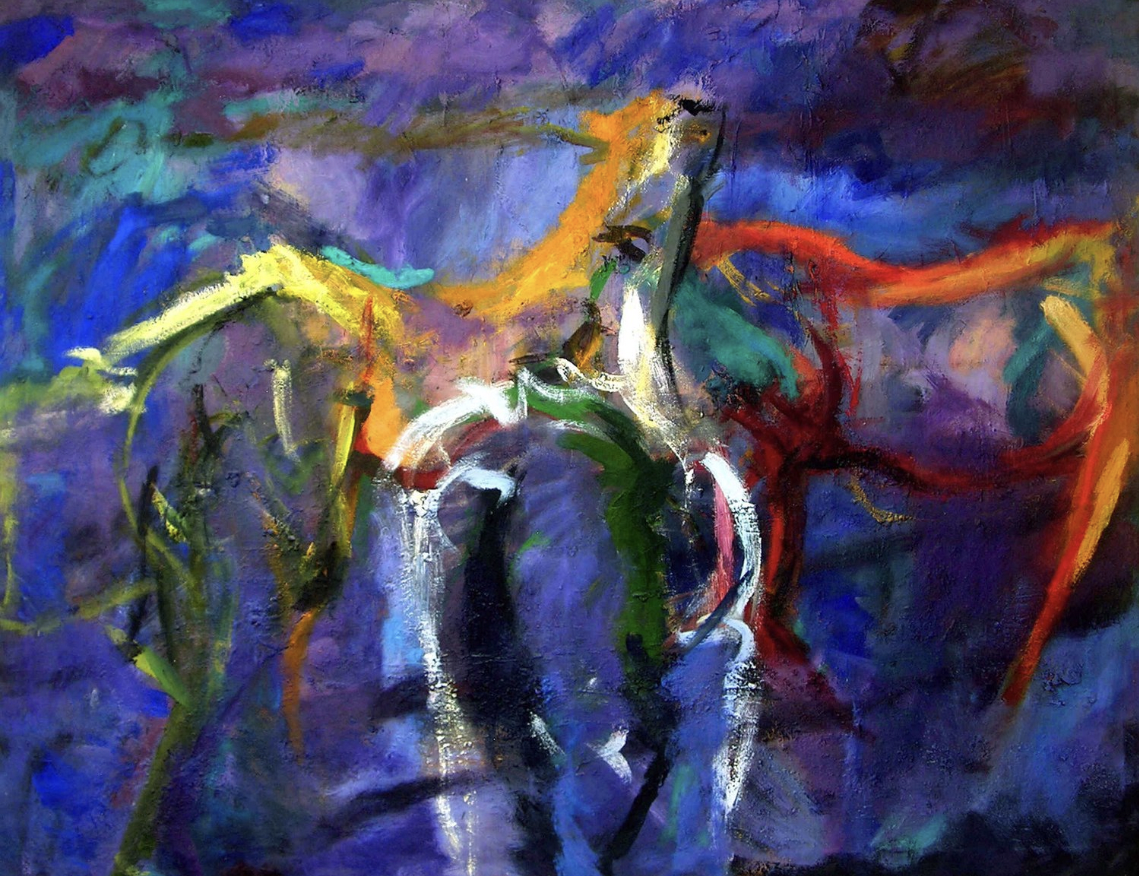
Small Herd Camargue - painting by Ronan Walsh

Walsh was born and raised in Dublin. Painting from an early age, the teenage artist was encouraged to develop his art by his father, the artist Owen Walsh, with whom he was reunited at sixteen following thirteen years of estrangement. He first exhibited work at seventeen whilst living in the Netherlands, shortly after which followed a series of one-man exhibitions in Dublin. Walsh continued traveling, exhibiting and living throughout Europe during the eighties, using Dublin as his base until, following a brief marriage to a Canadian artist, he relocated to Toronto in 1990 and became a citizen in 1994. He now divides his time between Ireland and Canada.

== Career ==
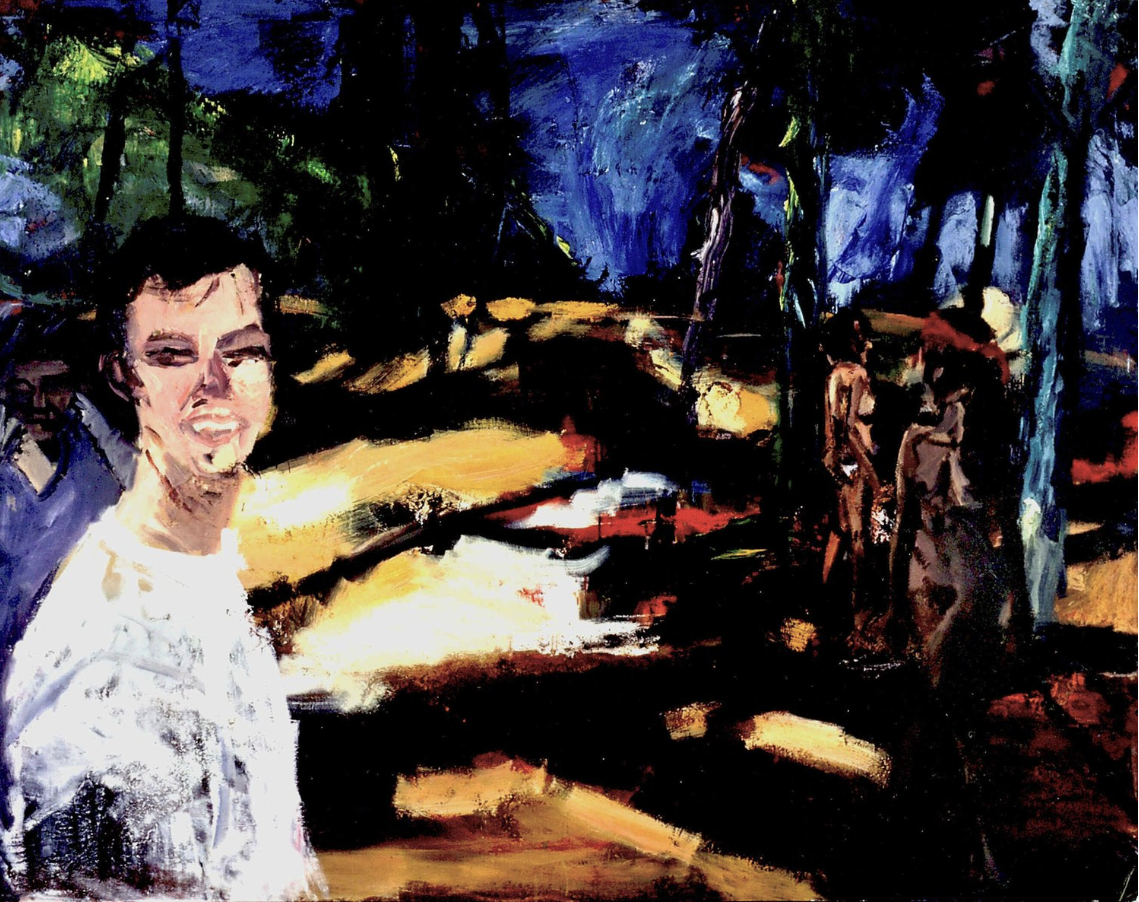
Strangers meet in a Forest - painting by Ronan Walsh

Walsh graduated early from NCAD in 1984, having been skipped two years due to a number of previously well-regarded exhibitions in Dublin and the Netherlands that received support from the poet Edward James. During his time at college he was tutored by the artist Sean Scully. Between 1984 and 1988 Walsh was closely involved with Temple Bar Gallery and Studios and Project Arts Centre in Dublin, exhibiting at both and locating his studio at the former. In 1987 he was elected Chairman of Independent Artists, founded by his father in 1959 as an alternative to the more conservative Royal Hibernian Academy. In 1987 he also organized art classes and exhibitions with the Simon Community for the homeless. During the late eighties Walsh exhibited with "Le Nouveau Crie Artists Association" at Le Centre Culturel et Aerospatiale in Toulouse, France and in Ghent, Belgium. During this time he also exhibited at the Project Arts Centre in Dublin. In 1988 Walsh was chosen to represent Ireland at Art Junction in Nice, France. Walsh held several exhibitions in the nineties, primarily in North America, including shows at the Jadite Galleries in New York and at Bond Latin Art in San Francisco. He also exhibited in Toronto and in Taylor Galleries in Dublin. Walsh has also taught art in Canada over several years.

== Art ==
Red Sea, oil on canvas, 1985

Walsh first exhibited paintings at the age of seventeen, drawing attention both from the Irish Times and the Irish Independent. His early work, primarily landscapes with people, possessed the lyrical, semi-abstract, slightly Surrealist aesthetic that could then be seen in the contemporary work of older Irish artists such as Patrick Collins, Louis le Brocquy and Walsh's own father, the artist Owen Walsh. Subsequent to graduating from NCAD, the setting and the aesthetic of the paintings begins to change. The semi-abstract, pastoral landscapes are replaced with more figurative depictions of urban settings; the early romantic lyricism gives way to a harder-edged Expressionist style articulated through thick, heavily textured paintwork and the utilization of found objects. At this time, 'his handling of paint is raw, his approach is physical and aggressive,' But Walsh's style was not traditionally Expressionist: 'actually there is very little of the archetypal German Expressionist about Walsh, his use of colour is more comparable to the French.' Towards the end of the eighties, Walsh becomes affiliated critically with the Neo-expressionist and Transavantgarde movements in Europe. The shift from abstraction "towards figuration and greater realism becomes most pronounced in the 1990s, a decade in which Walsh also shifts his focus from the urban to a more natural setting of forests and beaches.

This concentration on natural settings and subject matter has continued in Walsh's post-millennial work, in which the figure of the Camargue horse and the West of Ireland feature both as sources of inspiration and as thematic motifs. The turn of the century has also seen a return towards the abstraction that had characterized some of his earlier work. Discussing his 2009 show 'Camargue,' Joanne Savage wrote:

Ronan Walsh's work retains a tension between abstraction and figuration that recalls the work of Jack B. Yeats in moments like 'The Singing Horseman' and abstract expressionists like Willem de Kooning. There is the same vigorous, thickly applied paint and scenes where subjective expression overrides careful or conservative rendering of the subject.

The affinity with de Kooning was also recognized by David Moos:

Walsh displays his embrace of Willem de Kooning's hot palette of red, pink, orange, Joan Mitchell's tangle of feinting and darting brushstrokes, and Norman Bluhm's thinned, dripping and running oil residue...[he] is an artist who is eking out his own space in the impossibly congested territory of abstraction today.

== Selected exhibitions ==
- 2011: Toronto International Art Fair, Toronto, Canada
- 2011: Nicola Rukaj Gallery, Toronto, Canada
- 2009: Gormleys Fine Art, Belfast, Northern Ireland
- 2008: Galerie d’Olivier, Marseilles, France
- 2007: Bold Art Gallery, Galway, Ireland
- 2006: Miriam Shiell Gallery, Toronto, Canada
- 2005: Lee Gallery, Cork, Ireland
- 2004: Art Fair, Dublin, Ireland
- 2001: Gallery Moos, Toronto, Canada
- 2000: Hallward Gallery, Dublin, Ireland
- 1999: De Leon White Gallery, Toronto, Canada
- 1998: Drabinsky Gallery, Toronto, Canada
- 1996: Bond Latin Art, San Francisco, USA
- 1996: Jadite Gallery, NYC, USA
- 1996: Del Bello Gallery, Toronto, Canada
- 1992: Riverun Galleries, Dublin, Ireland
- 1989: Gallery Moos, Toronto, Canada
- 1988: Gallery D.C., Ghent, Belgium
- 1988: Nice Art Fair, France
- 1987: Temple Bar Gallery, Dublin, Ireland
- 1986: Centre Cultural L’Aerospatiale, Toulouse, France
- 1985: Lincoln Gallery, Dublin, Ireland
- 1985: Fendersky Art Gallery, Belfast, Northern Ireland
- 1980: Celtic Court Gallery, Dublin, Ireland
- 1978: Robinson Gallery, Dublin, Ireland
- 1977: Sachs Hotel, Dublin, Ireland
