= Keith Drury =

Keith Drury may refer to:

- Keith Drury (theologian)
- Keith Drury (artist)
