= Kingerlee =

Kingerlee is a surname. Notable people with the surname include:

- John Kingerlee (born 1936), Irish artist
- Thomas Henry Kingerlee, builder and twice mayor of Oxford, England
