= Bryan McCormack =

Irish-born French contemporary artist

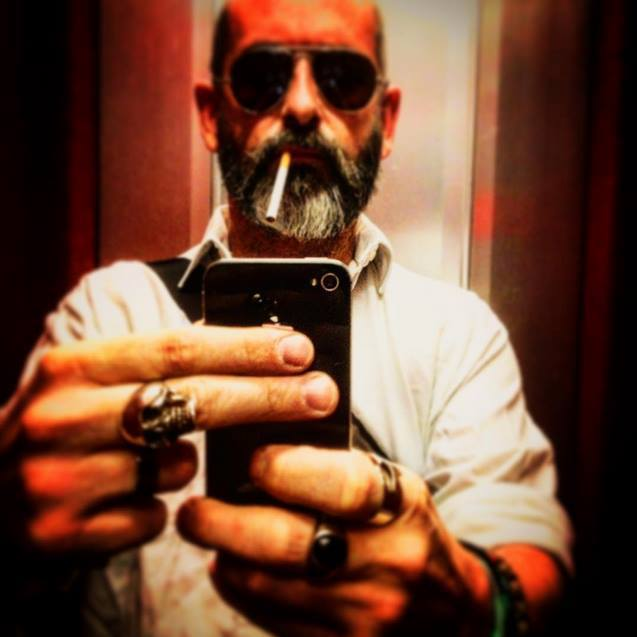
- Born: 15 September 1972 (age 54); Dublin, Ireland
- Known for: Sculpture; Painting; Video; Photography; Drawing; Performance art; Installation art
- Notable work: When Joris Ivens meets Hraesvelgr; Preservation is life – Les sons de ma vie
- Movement: Contemporary art
- Website: roaringfromparis.tumblr.com

Bryan McCormack (born in Dublin, 15 September 1972), is a contemporary artist who creates social concept sculptures and installations. McCormack has completed over 30 group and solo art exhibitions. He lives and works in Paris, France.

== Biography ==
=== Early life ===
McCormack was born in Dublin, Ireland. After his initial studies, Bryan McCormack left Ireland to travel, and several of his works were exhibited in Europe in the early 2000s, at the start of his career.

=== Career ===
In 2003 and 2004, McCormack exhibited the piece the piece Who Are The Heroes, an installation about the devastation caused by military action at the Castello di Castagneto Po Foundation near Turin, Italy. He also exhibited Unleashing The Design of Imponderable Immortality on the Misguided, Servile Burgeoise, an installation that focused on the economic divide between social classes. In 2005, Bryan McCormack exhibited at the Empire Gallery in London, Intimate Whisperings While the Words Break Down which investigated mental illness in today's society. The same year, he also exhibited at the Galerie Colbert in Paris The Diaries of John Doe (3) which focused on themes of loneliness and solitude. In 2006, the Christian Colas Gallery in Paris hosted the installation See Nothing, Hear Nothing, No Nothing which looked at economic and social themes linked to apathy.

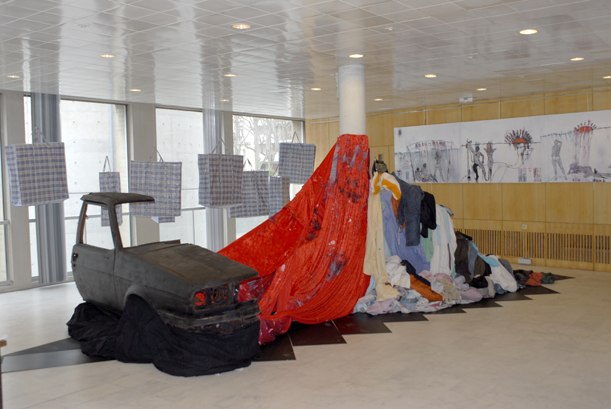
The 2009 installation Ear-Splitting Timbre represented the destruction and urban violence of car bombs and urban terrorism in today's world, shown at UNESCO in Paris.

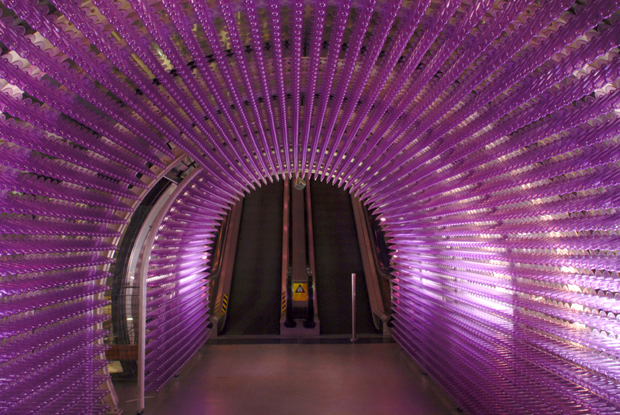
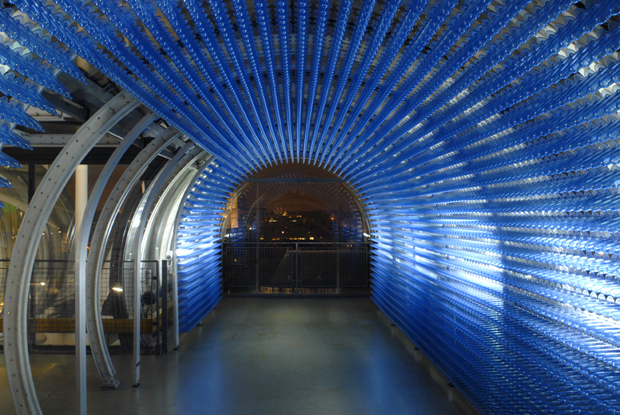
Views of the Preservation is life – Les sons de ma vie installation at the Centre Pompidou

By the 2010s, he had a number of permanently installed pieces as well as public sculptures, such as When Joris Ivens meets Hraesvelgr, focused on ecological politics in developed society. McCormack created it as a tribute to the film "Pour le Mistral" (1966), by the Dutch filmmaker Joris Ivens. The sculpture was permanently installed at the Parc de Saint-Cloud in Paris. McCormack's 2011 installation Preservation is Life – The Sounds of my Life explored the practices of safe sex and the political ramifications of contemporary sexuality. The work consisted of 80,000 condoms and was installed over the six floors of the Centre Pompidou in Paris.

His works often focus on social justice and the urban environment. Chromo Zone Y was a 2012 performance installation that questioned poverty and its consequences and was produced by RainDogs Theatre Company at the Theatre of Menilmontant, Paris. Likewise, his 2014 piece Van'Heart was a day shelter people without permanent housing. McCormack worked with students at the College Marx Dormoy in Paris in creating the temporary refuge. In collaboration with the City Hall of Paris he worked on UPP Urban ProjectParis, a research project looking at the production of new forms of urban installations.

Between 2016 and 2017, McCormack worked on the project Yesterday/Today/Tomorrow for the Venice Biennale 2017 which gave voice to the 2015 European migrant crisis by having participants from refugee backgrounds create 3 drawings, one of their life before (Yesterday), one of their current life (Today) and one of their imagined future (Tomorrow).
