= Sheila McClean =

Irish artist

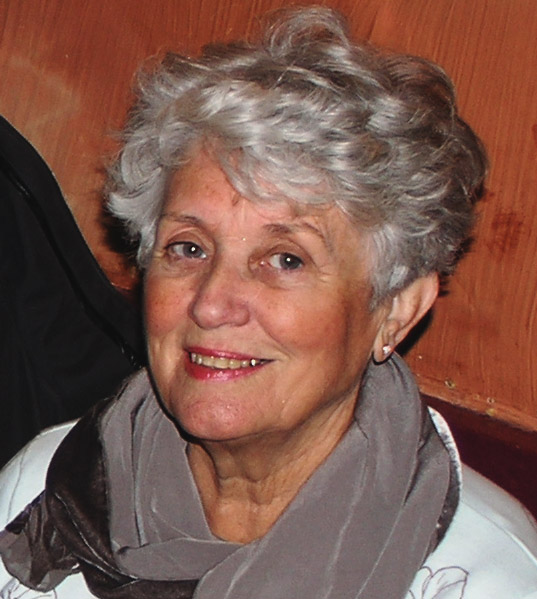
- Born: 13 August 1932; Moville, County Donegal, Ireland
- Died: 5 August 2016 (aged 83); Derry, Northern Ireland
- Occupations: Teacher, Artist
- Spouse: Raymond McClean
- Children: 2

Sheila McClean, RUA, (13 August 1932 – 5 August 2016) was an Irish painter, whose work was in the impressionist style.

== Life and work ==
Sheila McClean was originally from Moville, County Donegal, Ireland and attended Thornhill College in Derry, Northern Ireland where she later lived. She painted the land and sea around her.

Derek Hill, a great admirer of her work, said, "Her paintings capture the Donegal we all feel in retrospect".

Joseph McWilliams, PPRUA, said, "Her landscapes are painted landscapes, her boglands are expressive marks of paint, on richly textured surfaces redolent of bog cotton and dank brown pools..... Her work reflects a deep understanding of both place and paint".

Commenting on her most recent one woman exhibition McClean stated:

"Painting for me is a necessary means of self-expression. My desire as a painter is to establish a relationship between intuitive imagery, and a spontaneous method of painting. I try to achieve this, through a combination of economic statements, which are personal rather than purely descriptive and keeping myself aware of the life and integrity of the paint itself."

"Paint is the image. Image is the paint"

== Collections ==
- National Self Portrait Collection, Limerick.
- Derek Hill Collection, County Donegal.
- D.F.P (NI Civil Service).
- UTV Collection, Belfast.
- The Harverty Trust.
- Social Democratic and Labour Party (SDLP) Offices, Belfast.
- UNISON Collection, NI & UK.

== Commissions ==
- Stations of the Cross, St. Pious X Church, Moville, County Donegal.
- Belfast Calendar 1991

== See also ==
- List of painters
- List of Irish artists
