= Yesterday/Today/Tomorrow =

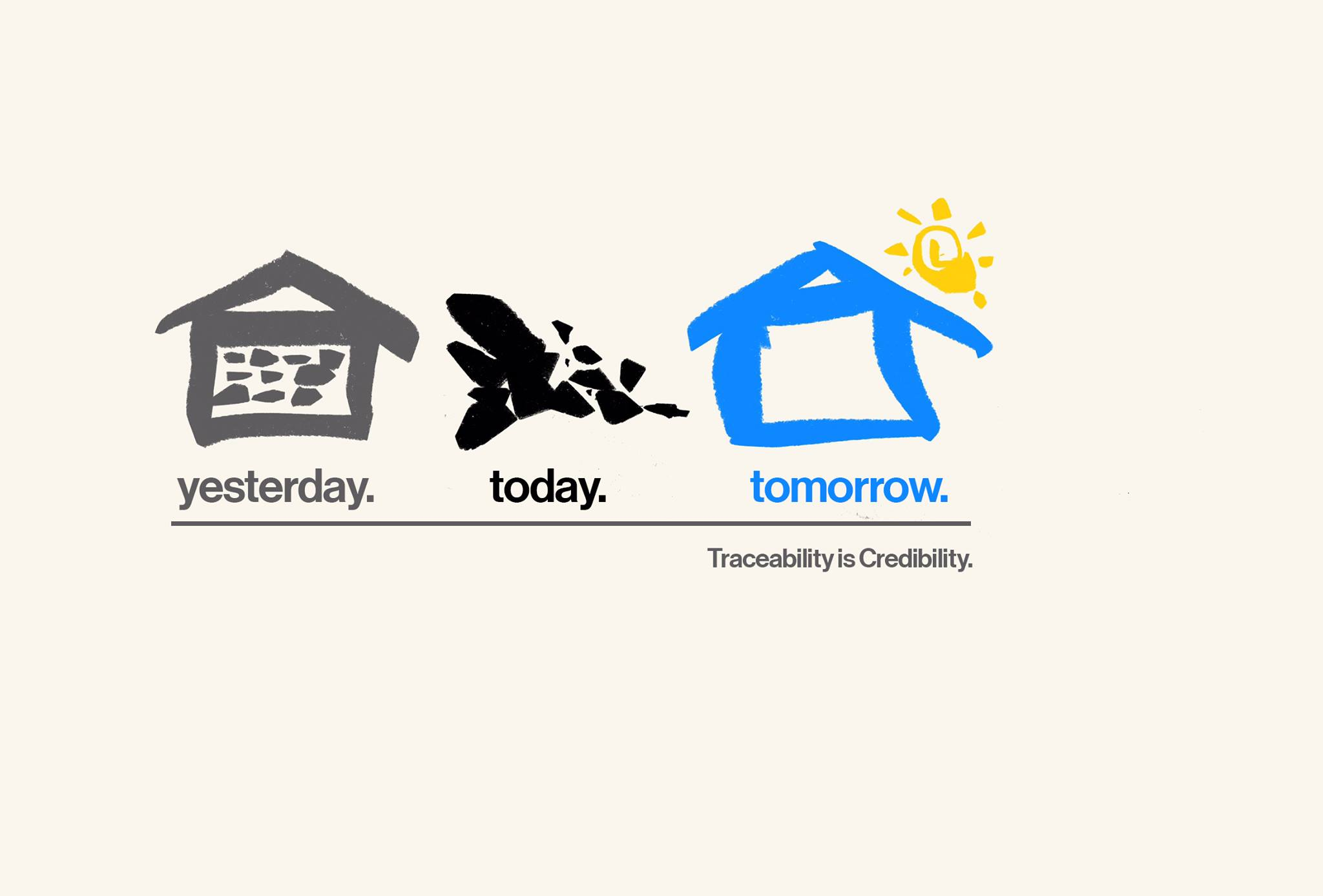
Yesterday/Today/Tomorrow's Business Model Canvas

Yesterday/Today/Tomorrow (Traceability is Credibility) is a conceptual art and research project created by Bryan McCormack in September 2016. The project encompasses drawings by thousands of individuals, social media installation arts, as well as educational and community projects in partnership with several universities in Europe. Its focus is the European refugee crisis.

== Creator ==
Bryan McCormack, born on September 15, 1972, in Dublin, is an Irish contemporary artist and activist. Over the past fifteen years, McCormack has exhibited his work in more than 30 group and solo exhibitions. Currently, he resides and works in Paris, France.

His works are based on the belief that art has the power to impact society and achieve social change.

== Development ==
Since 2016, McCormack has engaged in a project that involves visiting centers, squats, and refugee camps in 11 countries across Europe and North Africa, including Morocco.

With a team of volunteers, he encourages refugees to create three drawings that represent different aspects of their lives. The first drawing depicts their life before leaving their home country (Yesterday), the second represents their current circumstances (Today), and the third envisions their imagined future (Tomorrow). The drawings have been shared through the project's social media accounts.

== Exhibitions ==
Several hundred of these refugee drawings, along with multidisciplinary installation art inspired by the stories the drawings depict, were shown in Italy at the Fondazione Giorgio Cini during the May 2017 Venice Biennale. This installation was in conjunction with a performance curated by the artist and Henry Bell, alongside 40 students from Sheffield Hallam University.
