= Edmund Garvey =

Irish painter (1740–1813)

Edmund Garvey RA
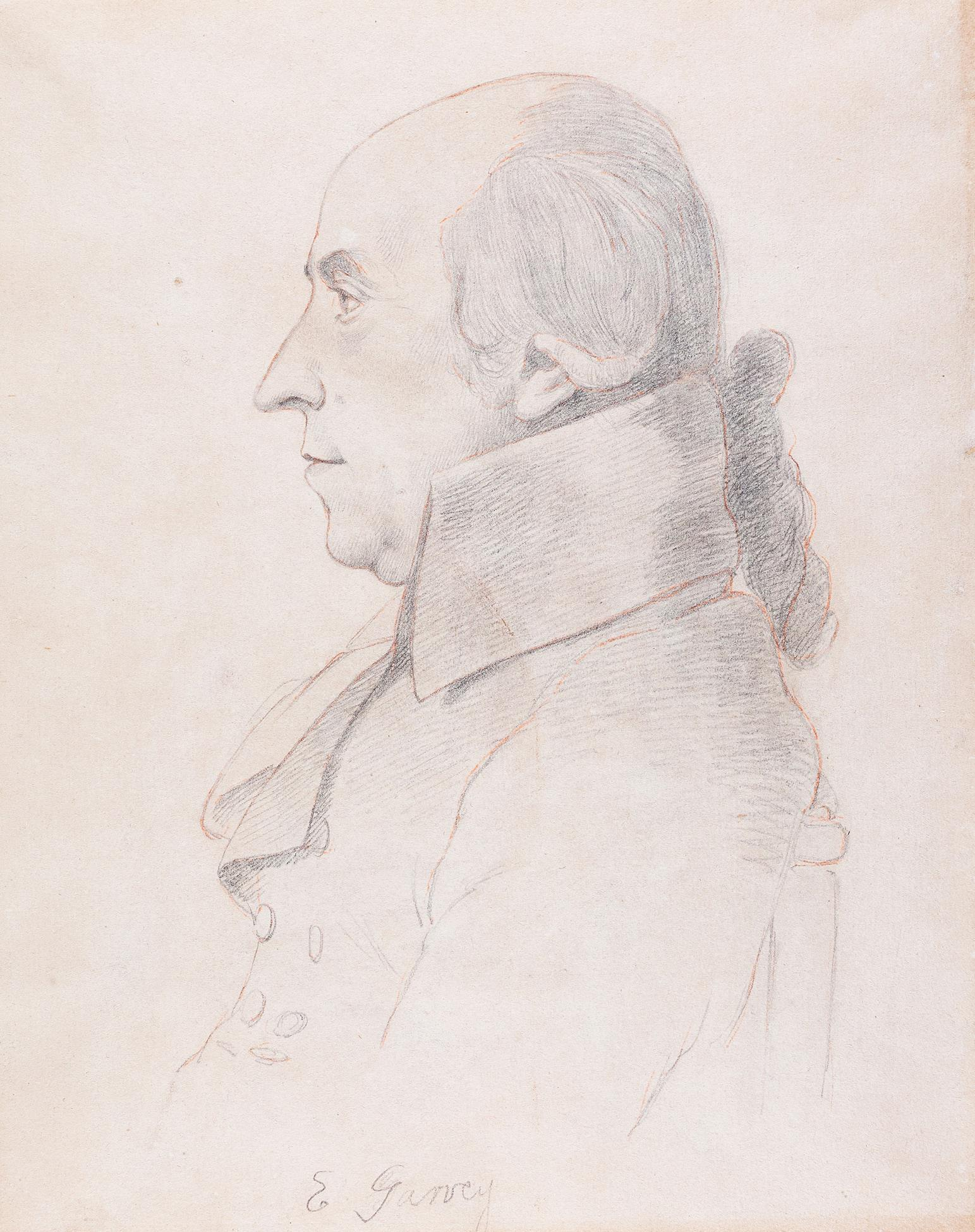
- Portrait by William Daniell after George Dance the Younger
- Born: 1740; Kilkenny, Ireland
- Died: 28 May 1813 (aged 72–73)

Edmund Garvey RA (1740 in Kilkenny – 28 May 1813) was a landscape painter from Ireland. Garvey worked in oil and water-colour.

== Life and career ==
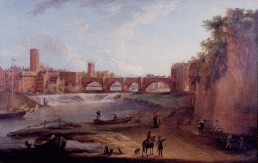
Old Dee Bridge, attributed to Edmund Garvey

Born in Kilkenny, Ireland, he first studied under Robert Carver and then in Rome. The bulk of his work was done in London from 1764 onwards, with a spell in Rome in 1798.

He exhibited views of Rome, around Savoy and other continental locations, for example, View of the Eruption of Mt. Vesuvius, May 1792 and View of the Lake of Geneva with the Effect of a Flash of Lightning. His watercolour Waterfall in the Alps (Royal Academy, 1769) was one of the first Alpine paintings exhibited in Britain.

He is perhaps best known for his somewhat heavy British and Irish views such as Figures In The Grounds Of Hestercombe, Somerset and The Old Dee Bridge, Chester.

He was elected an Associate in 1770, and was elected Royal Academician on 11 February 1783. He exhibited over 100 times at the Royal Academy.
