= Owen Walsh (artist) =

- Born: 1933; Westport, County Mayo, Ireland
- Died: 2002 (aged 68–69); Louisburgh, County Mayo
- Education: Dublin Metropolitan School of Art

Owen Walsh (1933–2002) was an Irish painter and graphic designer.

== Life ==
Walsh was born in Wesport, County Mayo in 1933, and grew up on Altamont Street. His parents were William and Delia Walsh. He attended Blackrock College, Dublin from 1946. At this time, Walsh was diagnosed with epilepsy. He married Beryl in 1954, with whom he had two children, Sharon and Ronan. They separated in the early 1960s. He later met Eileen O'Mara, who is the granddaughter of the tenor Joseph O'Mara. As divorce was not available in Ireland, Walsh and O'Mara did not marry nor did they live together. The lived in Paris for the early part of their relationship. Their son, Eoghan O'Mara Walsh, born in 1975. Walsh lived in Dublin for most of his life but later in life returned to County Mayo with Eileen, where he died in 2002 in Louisburgh from lung cancer. His son, Ronan, is also an artist.

== Career ==
He studied at the National College of Art (now the National College of Art and Design) in Dublin from 1950, where he received major awards for painting and composition, studying under Seán Keating, Maurice MacGonigal and Laurence Campbell. While still a student, Walsh had a solo exhibition in 1953 at the Dublin Painter's Gallery opened by the Earl of Wicklow. In 1954 he won the first Royal Hibernian Academy Scholarship in Art, the MacAuley Fellowship, after he graduated. He then travelled, taught and studied in Spain, France, and Italy. He taught composition at the Belles Arts in Madrid.

Walsh worked as a graphic designer in the 1950s, working for the Irish departments store Switzer's magazine Creation and McConnells Advertising. He produced advertisements for ESSO and BP. In December 1959, he founded The Independent Artists' Group (IAG) in opposition to the Living Art Group and the RHA with James McKenna, Elizabeth Rivers, Noel Sheridan, Patrick Pye and Charles Brady. The Group's first exhibition took place in June 1960, and was opened by Dr Noel Browne TD. Walsh continued to show with the IAG throughout the 1960s. He refused the offer of associate academician at the RHA around this time.

After he separated from his wife in the early 1960s, Walsh moved to 108 Lower Baggot Street. At this time, he worked as an assistant to artist Sean O'Sullivan. In 1962 he held his second solo show at the Brown Thomas Little Theatre. Walsh was part of a group known as "Baggatonia" alongside Brendan Behan and Patrick Kavanagh. He was also a close friend of Liam O'Flaherty, with whom he would debate in fluent Irish.

Having moved to Paris with Eileen, he won the Medaille d’Or at the International Salon of Art at Juvisy in Paris. After living in France from 1967 to 1970, he returned to Ireland where he continued to work until his death. Walsh split with the IAG in 1978, removing his work from their exhibition having been asked to remove some of his other paintings. His application to the Aosdána, which was supported by Noel Sheridan, was rejected.

His work is characterised by strong colour and post-impressionistic style, which was likened to Henri Matisse. Two retrospectives of his work have been held, in 2012 and 2019. A mural by Walsh from the 1960s was uncovered in 2022 during renovations of Thomas Rody Maher pub.
