= Caroline Scally =

Irish artist

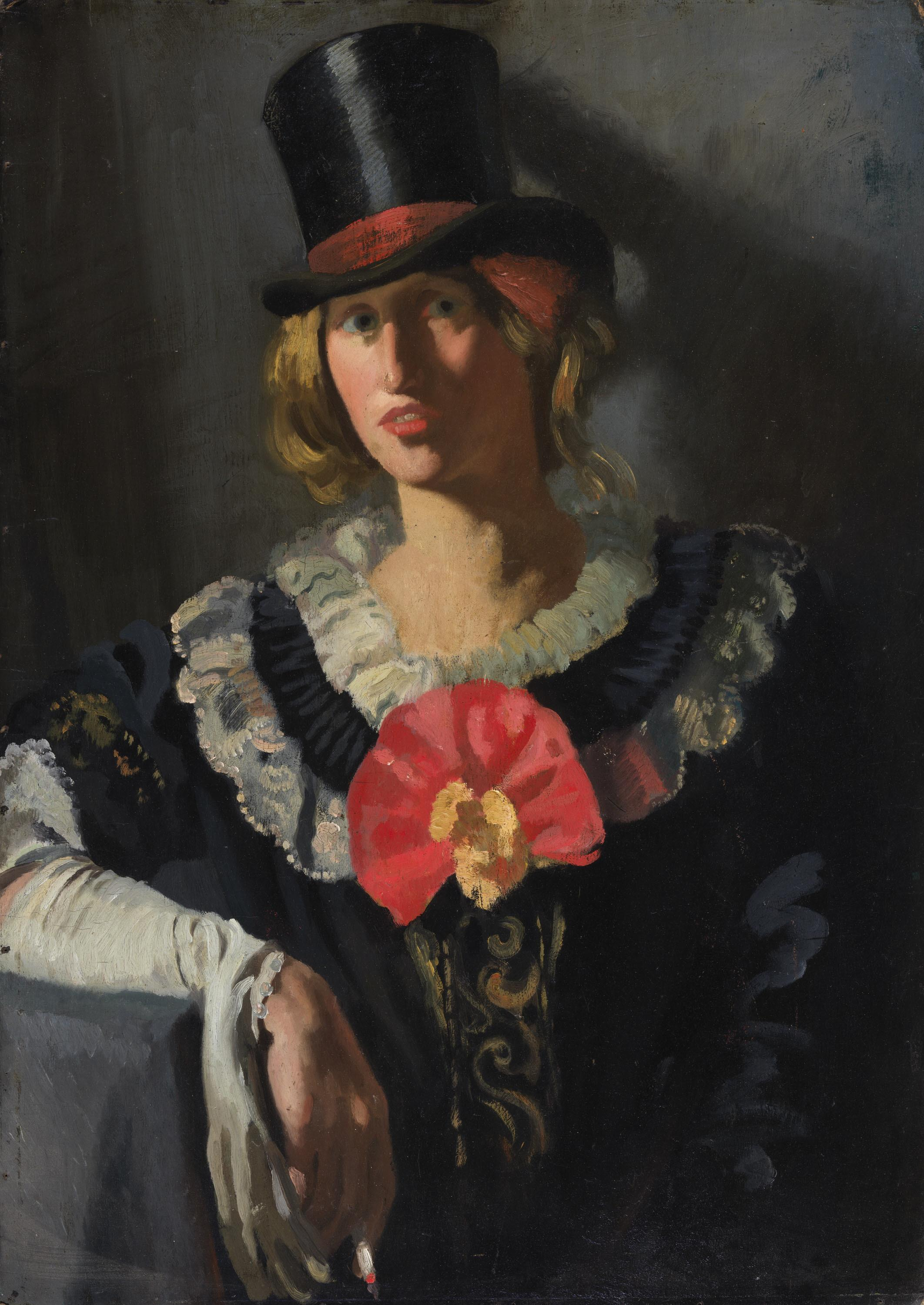
- Portrait by Sleator
- Born: Caroline Mary Stein; 29 October 1886; Dún Laoghaire
- Died: 26 September 1973 (aged 86)

Caroline Scally (29 October 1886 – 26 September 1973), was an Irish landscape artist.

== Early life and education ==
Caroline Scally was born Caroline Stein on 29 October 1886 at 7 Corrig Avenue in Dún Laoghaire, County Dublin. Her parents were Robert Francis and Mary Josephine Stein. Her family relocated to Blackrock in 1889, when Scally attended the Dominican Convert, Sion Hill. Herfather, Robert Stein, was an engineer, he was educated at the English Institute of Nymphenburg, near Munich. Just like her father, Scally spent some time in Germany studying at the English Institute of Nymphenburg.

Having returned to Ireland, Scally joined the Royal Hibernian Academy Schools and the Metropolitan School of Art as a student in the early 1900s. Here she met future artists James Sinton Sleator and Sean Keating. One of James Sleator’s most famous paintings is his oil portrait of Caroline in a fancy dress, and is held in the National Gallery of Ireland.

At the Metropolitan School of Art, Scally faced a strictly academic approach to art. Although he was one of her professors, the renowned artist William Orpen had less of an impact on Scally than he did on Sleator, Keating and other classmates. In 1911 Caroline won the Taylor art scholarships and prize competitions. She used the prize money to travel across Europe.

She returned to Ireland in 1913, and the following year she wed Dublin businessman Gerald Scally. They had five children. Her career was hindered at the time by family and domestic life, and her exhibitions grew less regular. After spending many years in Northern Ireland, Scally returned to, living Dublin at number 81 Leeson Street Upper.

== Career ==
She held her first solo show in 1930 in the Dublin Painters' Gallery. She was among the first exhibitors at the Irish Exhibition of Living Art exhibition in 1943 and showed with the Royal Hibernian Academy and Watercolour Society of Ireland. She became a committee member of the WSI in 1958 and went on to be President of the Society of Dublin Painters in 1962.

According to the Evening Herald, she was one of the best contemporary painters, with her style was also described as "mannered, with a pleasing dryish colour sense and a sense of humour". In 1952 Evening Herald described Scally as a painter of power originality and the spurning of nature. Scally's constant movement throughout her early life and thereafter is reflected in the names of her paintings such as 'Achill Graveyard'.

== Legacy ==
Her paintings remain displayed in the National Gallery of Ireland such as "The Canal Lock House". Several of Scally's works have disappeared in past years with her son, Sean Scally, was attempting to track down the whereabouts of her paintings in order to carry on her legacy and preserve her work in 1995.

== Featured exhibitions ==
- A Celebration of Irish Art and Modernism' (2011)
- 'Ireland: Her People and Landscape' (2012)
- 'Irish Women Artists: 1870-1970' exhibition (2014)
