= Millicent Girling =

Irish designer and illustrator

- Born: 23 June 1900; Waterford, Ireland
- Died: 2 November 1992 (aged 92); Gloucestershire, England

Millicent Girling (23 June 1900 – 2 November 1993) was an Irish designer and illustrator.

== Life ==
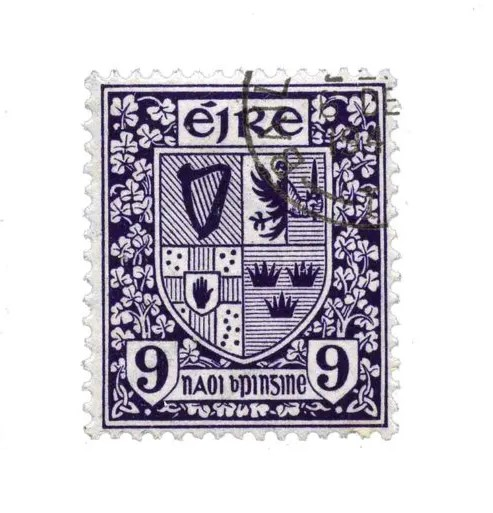
Girling's stamp issued in 1923

Millicent Girling born in Waterford on 23 June 1900. Her father, George Philip Girling, was a solicitor.

She trained in the Dublin Metropolitan School of Art in the 1920s to be an art teacher. George Atkinson noted Girling as an example of "high attainment" in the DMSA. While there, she took Harry Clarke's weekly classes on graphic design and book illustration. Like many of her classmates, some Girling's illustrations were published in The Irish Statesman and The Dublin Magazine, through Clarke's connections with the publications' editors.

Girling exhibited with the Royal Hibernian Academy (RHA) in 1922 with 3 watercolours. She designed one of the first stamps of the Irish Free State in 1923, depicting the four Irish provinces. She exhibited again with the RHA in 1926 to 1929.

On 8 August 1930, she married civil engineer, Keith Cranston Mann, and they lived in Portadown, and later in Gloucestershire. She died in England on 2 November 1993.
