= Marion King =

Irish artist

- Born: 1897; Trim, County Meath, Ireland
- Died: 1963 (aged 65–66); Dublin

Marion King (1897–1963) was an Irish artist known for her children's cartoons, illustrations, glass paintings, and broadcasting career.

== Life ==
Marion King was born in 1897 in Trim, County Meath, Ireland, into a family of eleven children. Her father, Thomas King, worked as a Customs and Excise officer. King spent time in Leeds during her youth, later attending Leeds College of Arts.

King died on 13 July 1963, in the Mater Nursing Home.

== Career ==
King returned to Ireland in 1922. She worked from her home in Dublin, making a steady income through commercial art. She pioneered a technique of glass painting that drew attention from artistic circles in New York and Paris. She patented the technique in the UK and Ireland. Several of her glass paintings were shown at an Associated Irish Artists in the Angus Gallery, St Stephen's Green, Dublin in 1934.

Some of her paintings were displayed in the Salon des Femmes Peintres and Salon de Artists Francais in Paris in 1936. She was also an associate of the Women Painters and Sculptor's Union in Paris. King was a member of the Academy of Christian Art, and exhibited with the group in 1937.

King wrote and illustrated a number of children's books in the late 1930s. From 1943, she hosted the Radio Éireann programme Drawing and Painting with Marion King having been recruited by the head of children's broadcasting, Kitty Roddy. The Irish Times published her cartoon story strip, Sean Bunny, from 1953 until her death in 1963. King became a successful radio presenter despite a speech impediment.

King's work with Radio Éireann led to the establishment of a series of travelling exhibitions of children's art based on the art submissions from her audience. The first exhibition was opened by Erskine Childers during his time as Minister for Posts and Telegraphs. She later presented the television programme Art Adventures with a Pinocchio-style doll, Cushsahaboo, with a feather in his hat, and Sean Bunny, a rabbit who wore dungarees. Despite ill-health, King continued to broadcast until 1962, a year before her death.
