= Josephine Webb (artist) =

Irish artist

- Born: 26 December 1853; Dublin, Ireland
- Died: 3 November 1924 (aged 70); Dublin

Josephine Webb: Red and white carnations in a glass vase

Josephine Webb (26 December 1853 – 3 November 1924) was an Irish portrait and landscape painter.

== Early life ==
Josephine Webb was born and raised in Dublin, Ireland. From a young age, she showed a talent and passion for art. She attended Alexandra College and the Queen’s Institute on Molesworth Street in Dublin; she won two silver medals there for drawing. In 1878, she studied at the Académie Julian in Paris. Louise Breslau, a Swiss painter and Anna Nordgren, a Swedish painter, were fellow students.

== Career ==
In 1879, Webb rented a Grafton Street studio in Dublin and began exhibiting at the Royal Hibernian Academy, where she was a member. She also showed works at the Water Colour Society of Ireland and the Royal Society of British Artists. In addition, Webb held two solo exhibitions in Dublin in 1904 and in 1908. Webb depicted landscapes, portraits and flowers. and her work is included in the collections of the Hugh Lane Gallery and the National Gallery of Ireland.

== Legacy ==
Webb's work has been offered at auction multiple times, with realised prices ranging from 251 USD to 1,401 USD, depending on the size and medium of the artwork. Since 2006, the record price for this artist at auction is 1,401 USD for "RED AND WHITE CARNATIONS IN A GLASS VASE", sold at Whyte's in 2006.
