= Simon Coleman (artist) =

Irish artist

- Born: 22 June 1916; Duleek, County Meath, Ireland
- Died: 17 February 1995 (aged 78); Stamullen, County Meath

Simon Coleman (22 June 1916 – 17 February 1995) was an Irish portrait and landscape painter.

== Life ==
Simon Coleman was born in Duleek, County Meath in 1916. He studied in the Dublin Metropolitan School of Art in the 1930s. He first exhibited with the Royal Hibernian Academy in 1940, and over the following 50 years exhibited over 200 works there. One of his most notable works was the commission The Council of State which was a retirement gift to President Douglas Hyde from the Irish nation. He also spent time in the field with the Irish Folklore Commission. He died in Stamullen, County Meath on 17 February 1995.

== Later life and death ==
Simon Coleman continued to work as an artist into his later life after finishing his traveling with the Irish Folklore Commission for the third time in 1959. The art that Coleman created consisted of many different styles and mediums such as watercolour and oil paintings, drawings and sketches, as well as pieces of writing. He had been commissioned once in 1949 and twice in 1959 to create visual documentation of the historical findings from the journeys to County Donegal, County Galway and County Clare. While working with the Irish Folklore Commission, Coleman kept notebooks that he treated in a diary like fashion to take notes on what he was observing as well as some of the stories he collected and had been told along the way. The storytellers he encountered throughout his life often became the subjects of some of the portraits he created. These diaries that he kept while on his three trips were consistently used later in his life by the Irish Folklore Commission to identify and trace records up to their findings and reports. Coleman's first exhibition that his artwork was part of was held in the Royal Hibernian Academy and over the next 50 years of his working and later life over 200 pieces of his artworks were used for in exhibitions there. Coleman had relocated to Dublin to study art at the RHA but he later moved back to County Meath to teach art in the Drogheda Technical School and remained living based out of Meath for the remainder of his life. In his home county of Meath, in the town of Stamullen, Simon Coleman died on 17 February 1995 at the age of 78.

== Legacy ==
Coleman's work for the Irish Folklore Commission included a collection of paintings and sketches, the majority of which are still available and used in the study of Irish Folklore in University College Dublin. His paintings and sketches were used to help describe folk tales and history, as well as the way of life of the inhabitants of Ireland at the time. He contributed to the preservation of Irish history, with the creation of representations of the people and places that ethnographers visited, evidence of history which would not exist without his contributions. Coleman also wrote journals of his time travelling for the Commission, for whom he went on three expeditions around Ireland, gathering information. His work is considered by those in the Department of Folklore UCD to be important for the preservation of Irish culture and the continued study of mythology.
