= Graeme Purdy =

Wildlife photographer

- Born: 1971 (age 54–55); County Down, Northern Ireland
- Occupations: Wildlife photographer; author
- Notable work: Eight Feet
- Awards: 2nd place, Sony World Photography Awards (2021)
- Website: purdy.photography

Graeme Purdy (born 1971 in County Down, Northern Ireland) is a Northern Irish wildlife photographer and author.

== Books ==
Eight Feet, 2018. ISBN 9781909751989

Proceeds to charity National Park Rescue.

== Selected exhibitions ==
2022 — Graeme Purdy: The Final Frontier, Woolff Gallery, London.
2019 — Graeme Purdy: Eight Feet, Woolff Gallery, London.

== Awards ==
2021 – 2nd place, Sony World Photography Awards (Wildlife & Nature, Professional Category)

Purdy's image Raw Nature of a lion was selected for the front cover of the Sony World Photography Awards 2021 book.
