= Margaret Allen (artist) =

Irish artist (1832–1914)

- Born: Margaret Allen; 1832
- Died: 1914 (aged 81–82); County Kilkenny, Ireland

Margaret Allen (1832–1914) was an Irish portrait and genre painter, the first woman to be an honorary academian of the Royal Hibernian Academy and one of Dublin's earliest female commercial photographers.

Allen was born in 1832, the oldest daughter of Mark Allen the owner of a picture framing, artist supplies, and lithographic printing business in Dublin. Little is known about her artistic training but it is likely she attended the Dublin Society drawing school and received art education in Paris. She exhibited over 50 paintings with the Royal Hibernian Academy between 1853 and 1894, and was the first woman to be admitted as an honorary academician of the Academy. She received that recognition in 1878.

Margaret Allen was the first Irish woman artist to deal with nationalist issues in her works. Allen's paintings provide an historical resource, particularly due to her prominent use of social commentary, which was a novel practice in her time. Her political sympathies are evident in paintings such as ‘The Last Hour in the Old Land’ (1876), and ‘Bad news in troubled times: ‘An important arrest has been made of a young man named —’’ (1886) with explicit references to the Irish nationalist cause. Allen commented on Irish-British antagonism, including in paintings she exhibited in Britain. Due to this open display of personal political opinion, some artworks were met with a critical response, and this may have contributed to Allen's lack of recognition other than the honorary Royal Hibernian Academy (RHA) membership.

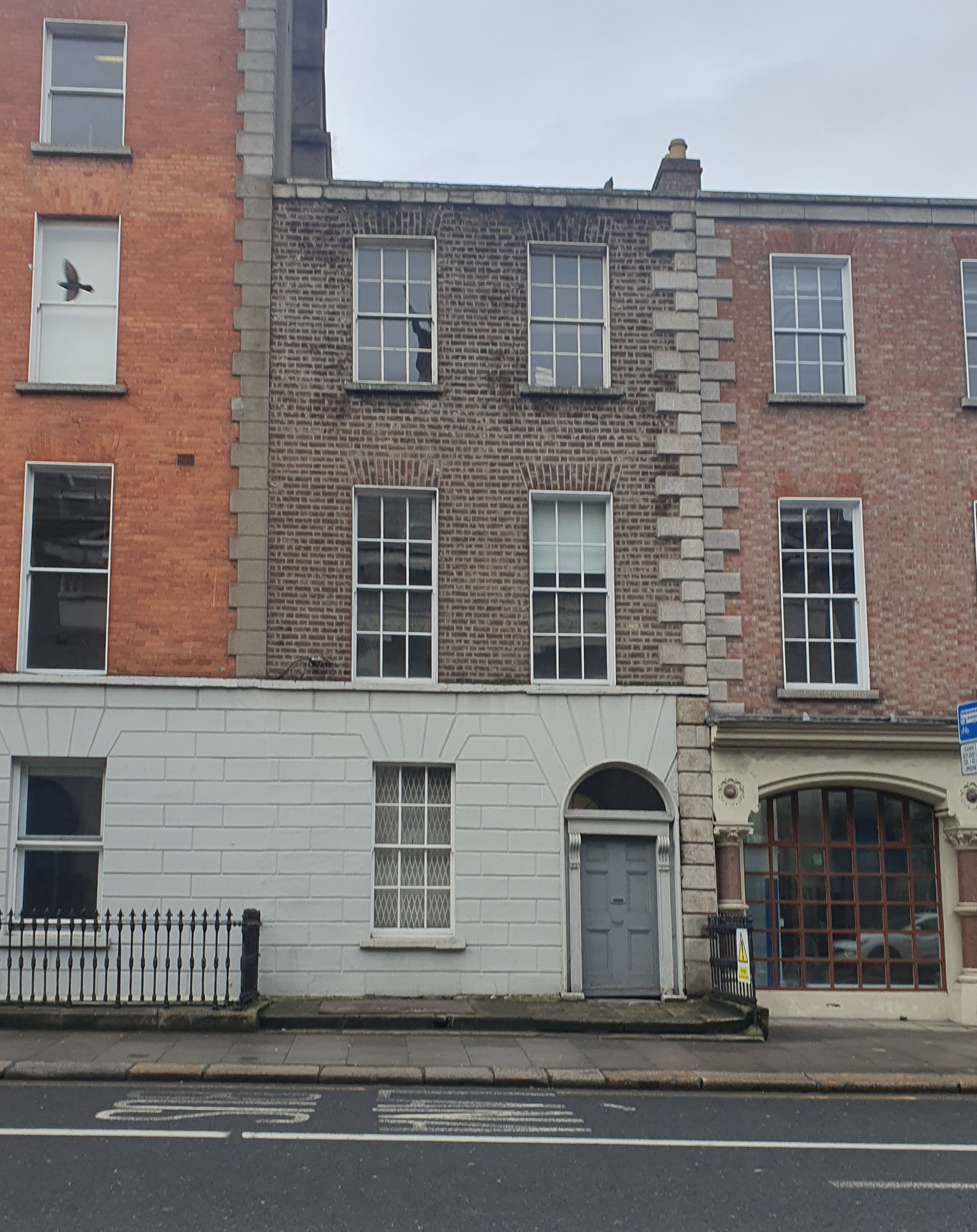
Building at 12 Westland Row, past home and business address of 19th century Irish artist Margaret Allen.

In addition to her painting Allen was also a notable business woman. She contributed to her father's business M. Allen & Co. at 12 Westland Row, Dublin. The business was originally a picture framers and lithographic printers from the mid-1840s. By the early 1860s the lithographic printing business had ceased and the business continued as an artists’ repository. Advertisements at that time indicated that Margaret had taken over running the business from her father as well as providing drawing and painting lessons. In 1865 the business branched out into studio photography. M. Allen & Co. was one of the first commercial photography studios in Dublin, competing with over 70 studios and adapting with the times during Ireland's period of ‘photomania’. Margaret painted backdrops and likely hand-tinted photographic prints. By 1871 she was behind the camera as a professional photographer. She maintained an interest in painting by operating the portrait studio in the same building, and using this mixture of activities as a marketing advantage.

By 1883 she was living in Manchester, England with her sister and continued to work as a portrait painter. The photographic business in Dublin closed in 1884. Margaret returned to Dublin, Ireland after her sister's death in 1903. She died in Brookville House at Balleen, County Kilkenny, Ireland on 26 March 1914.

== Notable works and exhibitions ==
Allen's painting ‘Bad news in troubled times' is displayed as part of the collection of Ireland's Great Hunger Museum at Quinnipiac University.

The 2023 RHA and Irish National Gallery It took a century exhibition featured one of Allen's portraits, depicting an unnamed man. This work was presented alongside works by the 59 female RHA academicians.
