= Gary Coyle =

Irish artist (born 1965)

- Born: 1965 (age 60–61); Dublin, Ireland
- Education: National College of Art and Design; Royal College of Art
- Parent: John Coyle RHA (father)
- Elected: Aosdána (2009)
- Website: garycoyle.ie

Gary Coyle RHA (born 1965) is an Irish artist, active in drawing, photography, spoken word and performance art. He is a member of Aosdána, an elite Irish association of artists.

== Early life ==
Coyle was born in Dublin in 1965. His father, John Coyle, was an artist and Royal Hibernian Academy member.

== Career ==
Coyle studied at the National College of Art and Design (NCAD, Dublin) and the Royal College of Art in London. He was elected to the Royal Hibernian Academy in 2007 and Aosdána in 2009.

Coyle works in drawing, photography, printing and performance. According to the Irish Museum of Modern Art, Coyle "considers ideas of the Gothic and its emphasis on fragmentary narratives and the conflict between man and nature." His work is found at the Irish Museum of Modern Art, Crawford and Royal Hibernian Academy.
