= Maria D. Robinson =

Irish-British painter

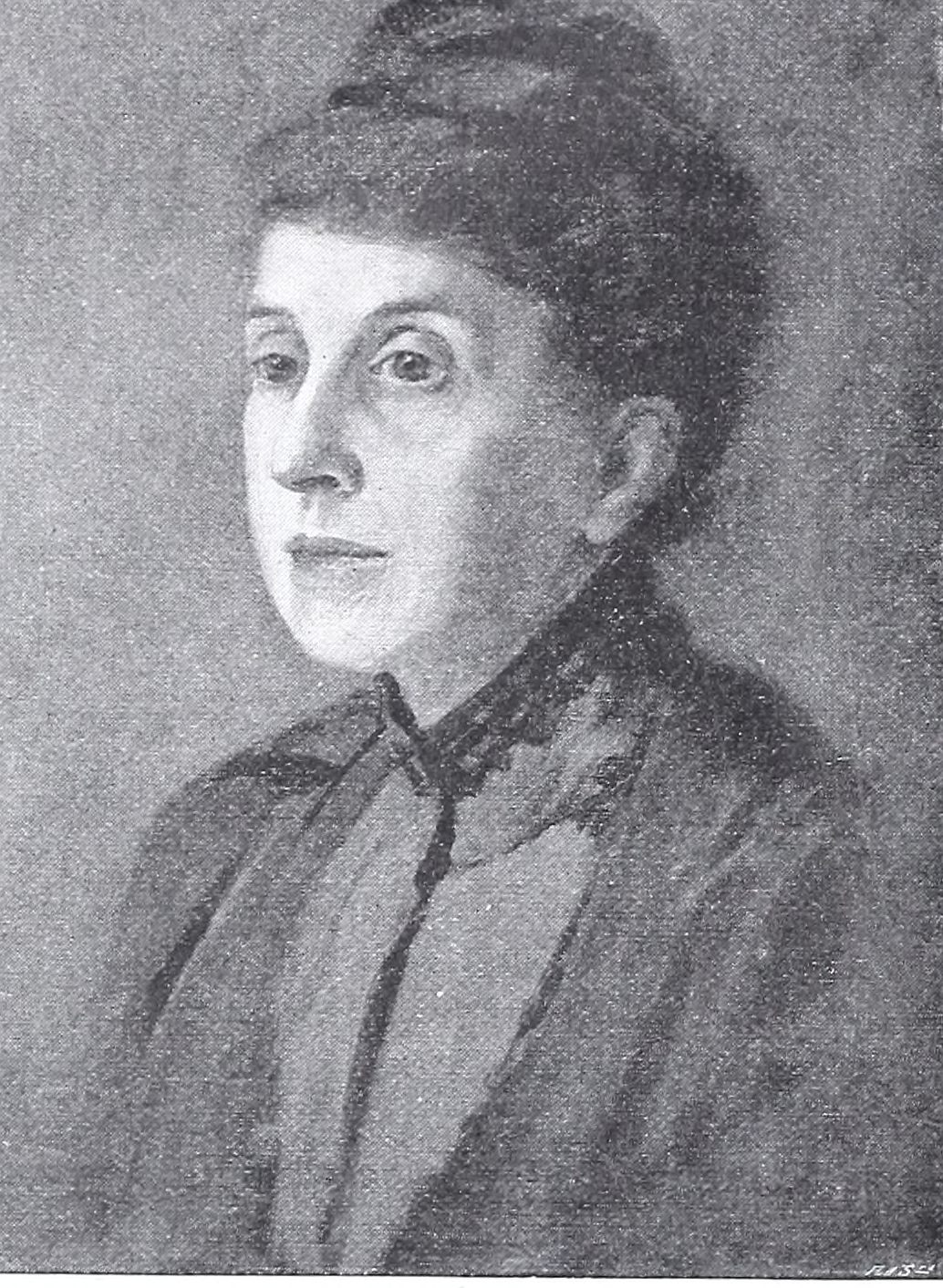
- Born: 1840
- Died: 3 July 1920 (aged 79–80)
- Occupation: Painter
- Spouse(s): Henry Harewood Robinson

Maria Dorothea Robinson, née Webb (1840–1920) was an Irish-British painter active in St. Ives, Cornwall.

== Life ==
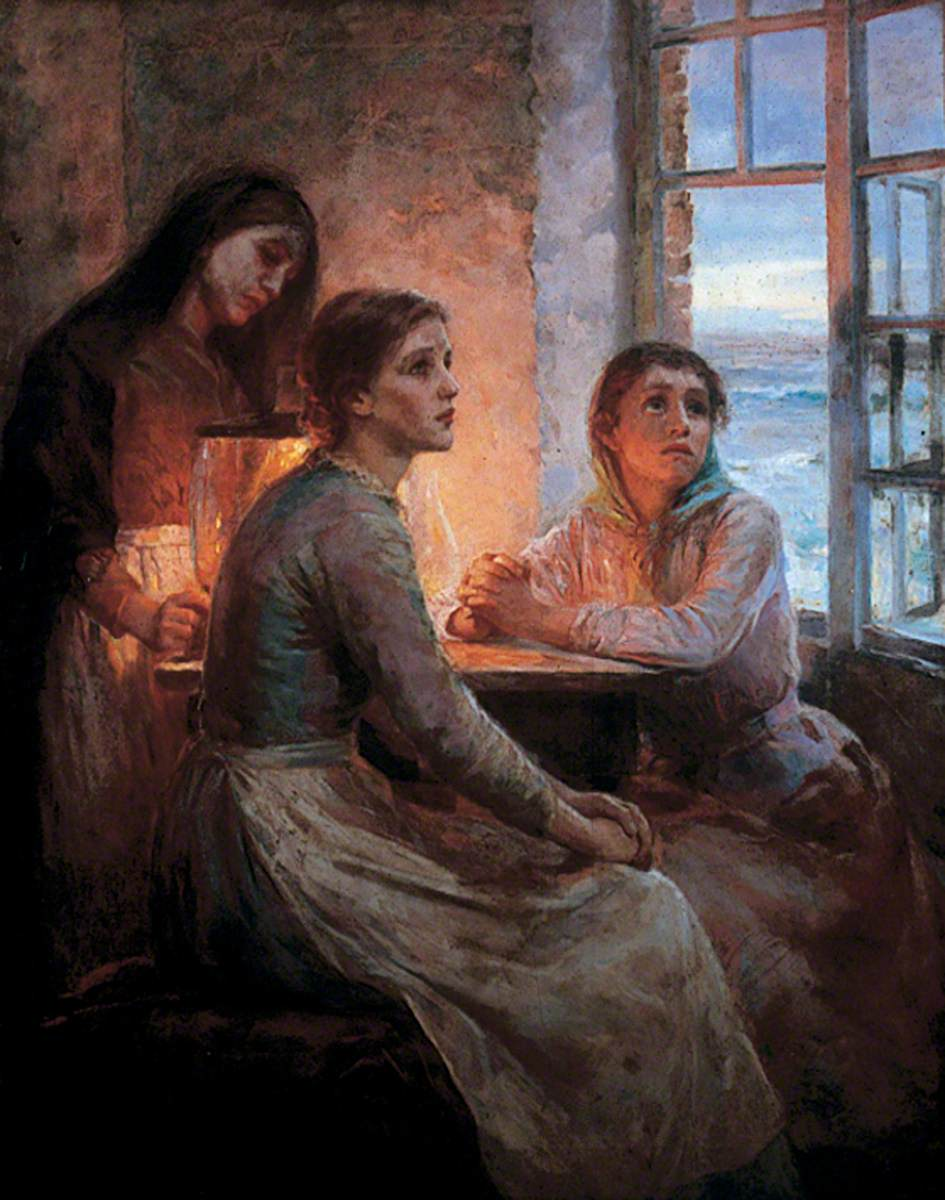
Three Fishers' Wives, Leeds Museums and Galleries

Robinson was born in Ireland and moved to Paris, where she was a pupil at the Académie Julian. She met and married the painter Henry Harewood Robinson and they lived in St. Ives, Cornwall from 1885. That year she had a picture, A Pool in the Rocks, shown at the Royal Academy in London. She is known for genre works depicting St. Ives and the Brittany coast.

Robinson died in York in 1920.
