= William Harrington (artist) =

Artist

William Harrington (born 1941) is an Irish artist noted for his drawings of Cork city people and streetscapes.

== Background ==
Harrington was born in Cork city, growing up in Coppinger's Lane off Shandon Street. His father was a baker/confectioner and his mother a dressmaker who also made saddles and harness. There was TB in the family. Harrington was hospitalised with it as a toddler and his father died of it when William was four and his brother, George, seven. He attended St. Joseph's School on the Mardyke. He was constantly drawing from childhood and although he wanted to follow his brother, George, into the bakery/confectionery business, his mother insisted he go to art school. He got a scholarship to the Crawford Municipal School of Art which he entered in 1955. He was particularly encouraged there by Diarmuid Ó Ceallacháin. He then went on to study in the National College of Art in Dublin.

== Career ==
Back in Cork, the sculptor, Séamus Murphy was a mentor to him, focusing his eye on the aesthetics of buildings and encouraging him to draw. With Murphy, in places like Corrigan's pub, he mixed with Cork's literati such as Frank O'Connor, Seán Ó Ríordáin, and the musicologist and composer Seán Ó Riada. The home of Seamus and Maighréad Murphy was also an open house for Cork's cultural circle.

Harrington taught art for a short time, but soon came to be a professional artist. His most well-known work is the illustrations he provided for Seamus Murphy's classic book Stone Mad. He later provided 21 illustrations for The Dictionary of Cork Slang by Sean Beecher.

He held a joint exhibition with Seamus Murphy in 1967. He had several one man and group shows and in 1988 a retrospective of his work, Cork Seen: Exhibition of Drawings, 1960-1987 was held at the Cork Arts Society gallery and travelled on to the Paul VI Institute for the Arts, Washington D.C. and Intersection for the Arts, San Francisco.
