= Hamilton Sloan =

Irish painter

Hamilton Sloan (born 9 December 1945 in Belfast ) is an Irish painter. He lives in Bangor.

== Early life ==
He was born in Belfast and spent a lot of his life in Comber, County Down.

== Career ==
Sloan worked in the Ulster Museum and completed many of the exhibits there today, the best known being Peter the Polar Bear.

Sloan pent several years in Donegal perfecting his craft.

He has lived and painted throughout Ireland. He works mostly in oil and watercolour.

His work is included in the collections of many Irish public bodies, and in private collections, including two former Irish Taoiseachs and many of Northern Ireland's leading politicians.
