= Joseph Malachy Kavanagh =

Irish painter (1856–1918)

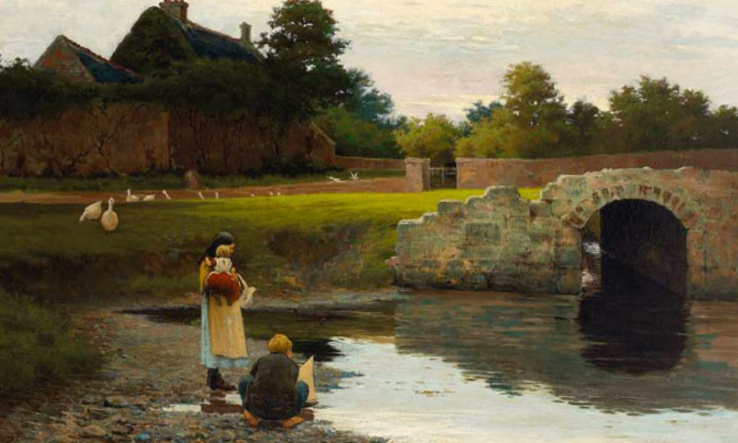
Probably the mouth of the Santry River at Raheny on the Dublin coast, 1895

Joseph Malachy Kavanagh (1856 – 17 April 1918) was an Irish painter. He is known for his painting landscapes, seascapes, rural scenes in Ireland, France and Belgium and occasional portraits. He particularly was inspired by the landscape in and around Dublin.

== Life ==
Kavanagh was born in Dublin. Despite being a prolific painter, his work is extremely rare. He was appointed as Keeper of the Royal Hibernian Academy in 1910 and was given a studio space on the upper floor of the building at Academy House on Abbey Street. However, this prestigious post was to bring him misfortune during the Easter Rising of 1916 when Academy House was destroyed by shelling and engulfed in a fire which destroyed his studio and most of his paintings. According to Aidan Dunne, the academy was likely hit by the Royal Navy warship HMY Helga (later in service of the new Irish Free State as the Irish patrol vessel Muirchu):

The Academy had been actively campaigning for a new building when the Easter Rising intervened. The annual exhibition was in progress. As fighting raged, the keeper, landscape painter Joseph Kavanagh, was painting one morning in Academy House when a piece of shrapnel from an exploding shell shattered a window and tore into the ceiling above him. The gunboat Helga had made its way up the Liffey and started lobbing shells into the city. Its target may have been either the GPO or Liberty Hall. Whether the Helga or artillery on the ground was responsible, a newsprint barricade on the street was ignited and the fire spread uncontrollably, engulfing Academy House. The hapless Kavanagh grabbed his chain of office, the academy charters and some other documents and ran for his life. The building was consumed by fire and with it the entire annual exhibition, the library, including all records, and Kavanagh’s life’s work – understandably, he never really recovered from the loss.

He was arrested by British troops as he left the building, and was held in the custom house for a week. After this his health declined. Kavanagh submitted a claim for his losses to the Property Losses Ireland Committee (PLIC/1/2694). The fire at Academy House destroyed over 500 pieces of art, including from artists Jack Butler Yeats, Madeline Green and John Lavery. The upper floors of the main facade of the building were retained and included in the replacement building.

It is recorded in the Irish Times of 3 April 1918 that he died in Dublin on 2 April 1918. However, the Calendar of Wills states that Joseph Malachy Kavanagh, artist, formerly resident of the Royal Hibernian Academy, died on 17 April 1918 and that his residence at his death was at 26 Great Brunswick Street (now Pearse Street), Dublin, and that he bequeathed his estate to Patrick Joseph O'Reilly. This address was also used previously by a sculptor, John Coates. Kavanagh lived next door to Patrick Pearse - who was one of the leaders of the Easter Rising in 1916 - and his brother Willie Pearse, both of whom were born at and resided at 27 Great Brunswick Street (now Pearse Street), home of the family business, until their execution on 3 May 1916 for their role in the Easter Rising.

Due to the rarity of his works, there have been forgeries sold as his paintings but his works are rarely unsigned.

== Career ==
Kavanagh first exhibited at the Royal Hibernian Academy from 1875. In September 1881 he won the Albert Scholarship and, along with Walter Osborne and Nathaniel Hill, travelled to Antwerp to take the "Nature" class under Charles Verlat. at the Académie Royale. They returned during the winter of 1882–83 to take Charles Verlat's "life" class.

On a trip to Brittany with Osborne in 1883, he met up with a host of other young artists including the Irishmen Stanhope Forbes, Nathaniel Hill and Norman Garstin - all of whom were influenced by the plein air naturalism of Jules Bastien-Lepage. Bastien-Lepage was a master of French realism. Kavanagh painted very similar subjects to those of Hill and Osborne in Quimperle, Dinan and Pont-Aven.

His style in this period is noted for the "strong sense of recession he creates, denoting his enduring fascination with perspectival effects...[and] his interest in architectural detail. All this is unified by a cool, restrained tone."

Kavanagh returned to Dublin in 1887. In 1890, he published in Dublin a series of prints from etchings he created of landscape scenes from Mont St. Michel, Bruges and of "A Metallurgist" which were acquired by the British Museum in 1902.

During the 1890s, he resided in Clontarf and it is stated that he "painted numerous views around Howth and its environs, many aspects of Dublin Bay and his famous views on the sands of Portrane, Sutton, Portmarnock, Merrion and the North Bull where, in 1893, he painted Cockle-Pickers on the North Bull Sands. In this same year he painted The Meadow Water at Swords. This introduces another popular theme for Kavanagh and many titles relate to this, for example, Portmarnock Marsh, Killester Ponds, Beside the Marsh, Portmarnock, A Salt Marsh and The Quarry Pond. Another related group entails views taken along Dublin’s riverbanks".

He became an Associate member of the RHA on 18 April 1889 and a Member on 26 February 1892. He was a teacher at RHA schools from 1892 to 1911. He exhibited regularly at the RHA, and participated in Hugh Lane's 1904 Exhibition of Works by Irish Painters in London.

Writing in 1949, Thomas McGreevy, former Director of the National Gallery of Ireland, refers to Kavanagh in an article entitled "Fifty years of Irish Painting": "Kavanagh had a wider range and more solid qualities than Osborne. But neither Henry Allan nor Kavanagh is sufficiently well represented in our public collections for it to be possible to form an adequate estimate of their achievement".

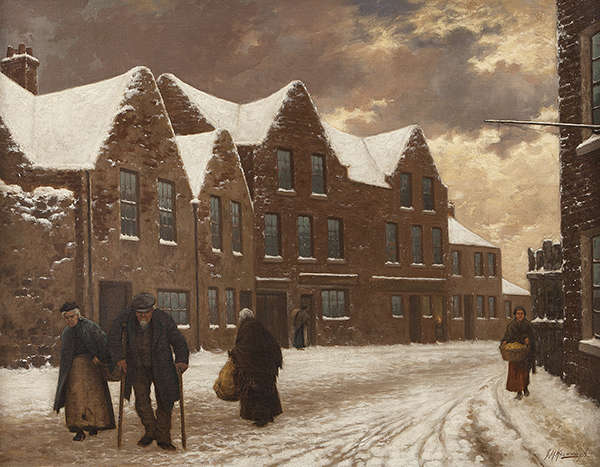
Old Dublin

== List of Known Works ==
Known works by Kavanagh that have been sold in various auction rooms are listed below.

=== Paintings: Dated works (in chronological order of year completed) ===
- Under the shadow of St Jacques (1881)
- Old convent gate, Dinan (1883)
- An Old Flemish Draw-Well, Merxem (1883) (Belgium)
- On the Banks of the Laita, Finistere. Dated 1885.
- A Breton Byeway. Signed Exhibited: RHA Annual Exhibition 1886 catalogue no. 1 Peintres Irlandaise en Bretagne, Musee De Pont Aven. When "A Breton Byeway" was first exhibited in 1886 it was described as "a very charming and competent work". The critic of the Dublin University Review Art Supplement commented "This is an excellent example of Mr Kavanagh's work. The expectant attitude of the kid tells of someone coming along the path and adds a point of human interest to the landscape which renders the picture particularly pleasing".
- Pursuing his gentle calling’ (1887), a self-portrait
- The Meadow Water at Swords (1893)
- DUBLIN BAY COCKLE PICKERS Oil on canvas, 23" x 38" (53.5 x 96.5 cm), signed and dated 1895. Exhibited: RHA 1896
- Woodland Pastures (1902) Collection of the Crawford Municipal Gallery, Cork, exhibited at the RHA in 1902
- Flecked with Sunlight. Dated 1903 verso
- The Stately Elm and In Rathfarnham Park, both exhibited at the RHA in 1903
- "Gathering Mushrooms" - a study Sepia. Original exhibition label inscribed with title and signed again verso This work is likely to date from 1904 when Kavanagh exhibited "Gathering Mushrooms - Feltrim Hill" at the RHA, catalogue no. 48.
- A November Evening, 1904. Collection of the National Gallery of Ireland
- The Hum of Summers in the Grove. Signed and dated 1905; also signed and inscribed verso 'Painted in Rathfarnham Park during the month of August 1905'
- Between the Autumn and the Spring. Exhibited:Belfast Art Society, 1905, catalogue no. 171 (£30-0-0); RHA, Dublin, 1906, catalogue no. 14 (£30-0-0); ’Exhibition of 18th, 19th and 20th century Irish Paintings’, Gorry Gallery, Dublin, 16–19 October 1987, catalogue no. 30
- Sheep in Pastures, Kilcock, Co. Dublin
- August Noon, Feltrim Hill, Co. Dublin. Dated 1906
- In The Grey of The Morning. Exhibited: RHA, Dublin, 1907, catalogue no. 236
- Dartry Pond, 1911
- Old Dublin - Marrowbone Lane. Exhibited: RHA, Dublin, 1918, catalogue no. 20. Literature: Ethna Waldron, 'Joseph Malachy Kavanagh', The Capuchin Annual, 1968, p. 324, illustrated p. 322
- Looking for the Best Spot

=== Paintings: Listed as by Kavanagh but no date provided ===
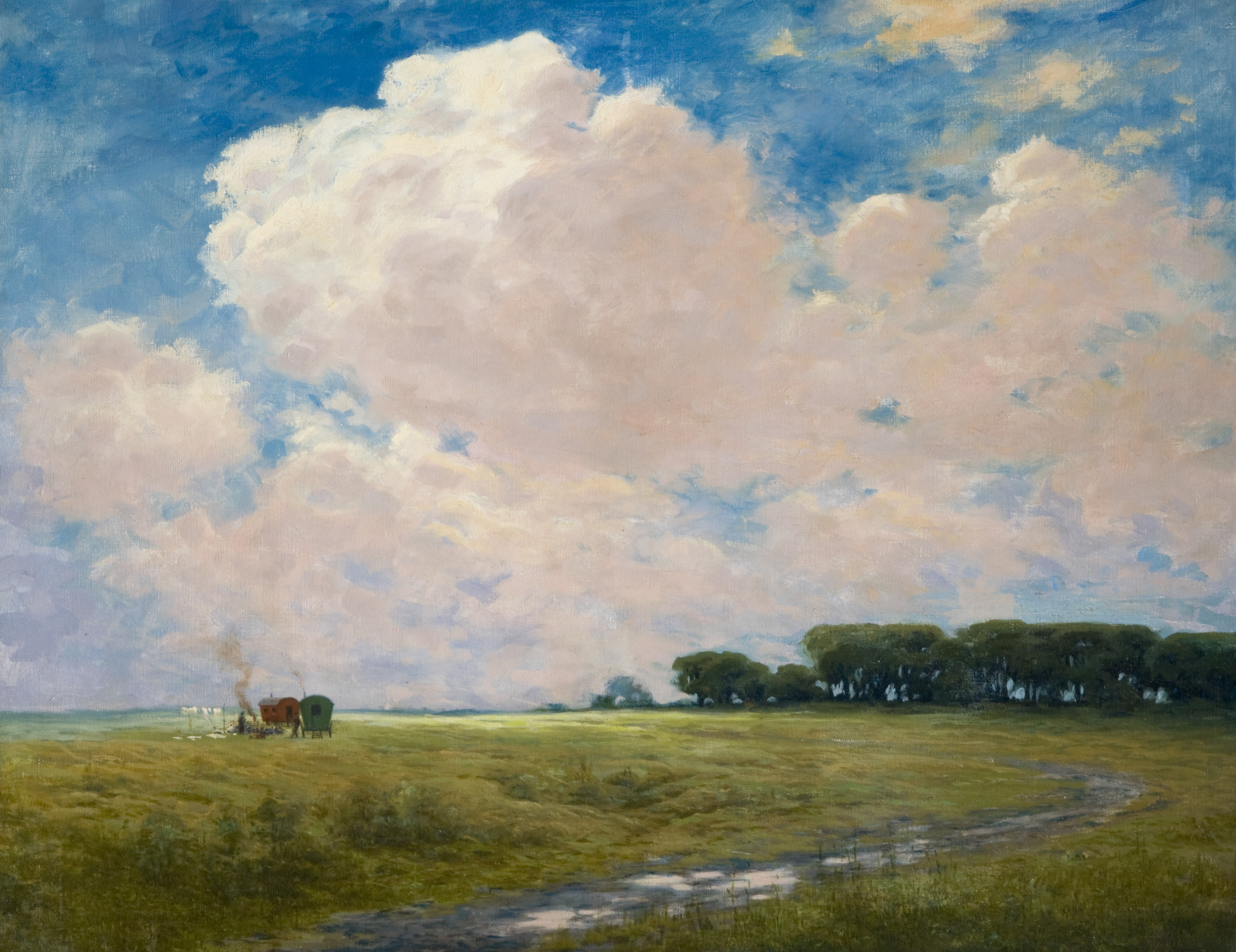
Gipsy Encampment on the Curragh by Joseph Malachy Kavanagh

- The Drover with his Flock, Homeward Bound
- The Dice Throwers
- Looking Out to Sea
- Pope Pius XII
- Gipsy Encampment on the Curragh

=== Etchings ===
All of the following etchings date from 1890 and are held in the British Museum:

- A Metallurgist
- The King's Gate, Mont St. Michel
- On the ramparts, Mont St. Michel
- Port du Baudets, Bruges
- The setting sun
