= SS Anglia (1944) =

History
- Name: Weserberg (1944-45); Empire Gallery (1945-47); Kampar (1947-57); Anglia (1957-74)
- Owner: Norddeutscher Lloyd (1944-45); Ministry of War Transport (1945-46); Ministry of Transport (1946-47); Straits Steamship Co Ltd (1947-57); Hellenic Lines (1957-58); Universal Cargo Carriers (1958-74)
- Operator: Norddeutscher Lloyd (1944-45); William Brown, Atkinson & Co Ltd (1945-47); Straits Steamship Co Ltd (1947-57); Hellenic Lines (1957-58); Universal Cargo Carriers (1958-74)
- Port of registry: (Nazi Germany) Bremen, Germany (1944-45); London, United Kingdom (1945-47); Singapore (1947-57); Piraeus, Greece (1957-58); Panama 1958-74)
- Builder: NV Machinefabriek en Scheepswerf P Smit Jr
- Yard number: 585
- Launched: June 1944
- Completed: February 1945
- Out of service: February 1974
- Identification: United Kingdom Official Number 180653 (1945-47); Code Letters GMCT (1945-47); IMO number: 5017589 ( –1974)
- Fate: Scrapped

General characteristics
- Class & type: Hansa A type Cargo ship
- Tonnage: 1,925 GRT, 937 NRT, 3,120 DWT
- Length: 85.19 m (279 ft 6 in)
- Beam: 13.49 m (44 ft 3 in)
- Depth: 4.78 m (15 ft 8 in)
- Installed power: Compound steam engine, 1,200IHP
- Propulsion: Single screw propeller
- Speed: 10.5 knots (19.4 km/h)

Anglia was a Hansa A Type cargo ship which was built as Weserberg in 1944 by P Smit, Rotterdam, Netherlands for Norddeutscher Lloyd, Bremen, Germany. She was seized as a prize of war in 1945, passing to the Ministry of War Transport and renamed Empire Gallery. She was sold to Singapore in 1947 and renamed Kampar. She was sold in 1957 to Greece and renamed Anglia before being sold the next year to Panama. She served until 1974 when she was scrapped.

== Description ==
The ship was 85.19 m (279 ft 6 in) long, with a beam of 13.49 m (44 ft 3 in). She had a depth of 4.78 m (15 ft 8 in). She was assessed as 1,925 GRT, 937 NRT, 3,120 DWT.

The ship was propelled by a compound steam engine, which had two cylinders of 42 cm (16 9/16 inches) and two cylinders of 90 cm (35 7/16 inches) diameter by 90 cm (35 7/16 inches) stroke. The engine was built P Smit. Rated at 1,200IHP, it drove a single screw propeller and could propel the ship at 10.5 knots (19.4 km/h).

== History ==
Weserberg was a Hansa A Type cargo ship built in 1944 as yard number 585 by NV Machinefabriek en Scheepswerf P Smit Jr., Rotterdam, Netherlands for Norddeutscher Lloyd, Bremen. She was launched in June 1944 and completed at Bremerhaven in February 1945. Her port of registry was Hamburg.

In May 1945, Weserberg was seized as a prize of war at Kiel. She was passed to the Ministry of War Transport. She was renamed Empire Gallery. The Code Letters GMCT and United Kingdom Official Number 180653 were allocated. Her port of registry was London and she was operated under the management of the William Brown, Atkinson & Co Ltd, Hull. On 15 October, she struck a mine 15 nautical miles (28 km) off the Cordouan Lighthouse, Gironde, France and was damaged. She was towed in to Le Verdon-sur-Mer. Empire Galleon arrived at Penarth, Glamorgan under tow on 7 January 1946 and was repaired there.

In 1947 Empire Galleon was sold to the Straits Steamship Co. Ltd., Singapore and was renamed Kampar.

In 1957, Kampar was sold to Hellenic Lines, Greece and was renamed Anglia. Her port of registry was Piraeus. She was sold the next year to Universal Cargo Carriers, Panama. With their introduction in the 1960s, Anglia was allocated the IMO Number 5017589. She arrived at Gemlik, Turkey on 23 February for scrapping by Centas Celik Makina. Anglia was scrapped in April 1974.
