= Lennon (artist) =

Irish artist (born 1947)

- Born: Ciaran Patrick Lennon; 1947 (age 78–79); Dublin, Ireland
- Education: National College of Art and Design, Ireland 1963–1967
- Known for: Painting

Ciaran Patrick Lennon (born 1947) is a Dublin-based Irish artist known for his minimalist large-scale paintings.

He was chosen to represent Ireland at the 1993 São Paulo Biennial in Brazil. In the same year, Lennon was elected to Aosdána (an Irish State honour conferred on artists whose work has made an outstanding contribution to the creative arts in Ireland).

He has been described as ‘one of the most important Irish painters currently working in the field of non-objective art’. Some of his most well-known work is ‘Porous Plane’, which originated from his Folded/Unfolded Paintings of 1969–1972.

== Collections ==
- Irish Museum of Modern Art
- National Gallery of Ireland
- Contemporary Irish Art Society
- The Hugh Lane Municipal Gallery
- Trinity College, Dublin
- Kamarsky collection in New York
- Fogg Museum, Boston
- Arken Museum of Modern Art, Copenhagen.
