= Nathaniel Hill (artist) =

Irish artist (1861–1930)

- Born: 1861; Drogheda, County Louth, Ireland
- Died: 17 February 1930 (aged 68–69); Betws-y-Coed, North Wales

Nathaniel Hill (1861–17 February 1930) was an Irish realist and impressionist rural genre painter.

== Early life and education ==
Convalescence (early 1880s) oil on canvas

Hill was born in Drogheda, County Louth. His father, Richard R. Hill, was a miller and owner of the R.R. Hill & Sons oatmill milling company. His family were Quakers. From 1877 to 1880 he studied at the Metropolitan School of Art and later the Royal Hibernian Academy (RHA) schools from 1885. He was a contemporary of Roderic O'Conor, Walter Osborne, and Joseph Malachy Kavanagh. He lived with O'Conor and his family at 88 Pembroke Road, Dublin when he first moved to Dublin.

== Career ==
His first exhibited artwork with the RHA was shown in 1880. He attended the Académie Royale in Antwerp from 1881 to 1883 with Osborne and Kavanagh. Whilst there, they studied life drawing under Charles Verlat. He won the Royal Dublin Society's Taylor scholarship in 1883, and a silver media from the Metropolitan School of Art. His earlier works were predominately in a realist style.

During the 1880s he made visits to Brittany with Osborne and O'Conor, including in the autumn of 1883 when he stayed at the artists' inn Pension Gloanec. He painted rural scenes, as well as peasants and country imagery. Many of his paintings had the same subject matter as Osborne, making it likely they painted side-by-side. He later spent some time in England painting similar genre and rural scenes, living in Worcestershire, Suffolk, Sussex and possibly Hertfordshire.

Hill won the Taylor scholarship again in 1884. He continued to exhibit with RHA, and then with the Dublin Art Club in 1886. He exhibited works at the Walker Art Gallery, Liverpool and the Royal Institute of Oil Painters up until 1893. He was appointed an associate of the RHA in 1892, and a full member in 1894.

Hill also painted portraits, mostly of family members. He exhibited a portrait of The late Alderman Branigan, J.P. with the RHA in 1895. This was his 27th and last work exhibited with the academy. His portrait of the brewer and banker, Thomas Plunkett Cairnes, is on loan to the Highlanes Gallery, Drogheda.

== Later life and death ==
His mother died in 1897. A relative later recounted that "It seems that shortly after he had won the grand prize in Paris, something in his life went wrong. My mother used to persuade herself that it was an unhappy love affair but it could have been a nervous breakdown. Whatever it was, the family never found out and Nathaniel returned from France to the family home and it appears never painted a stroke for the rest of his life." He lived the rest of his life with his two sisters, who were also unmarried. They eventually moved to Snowdon Villa, Betws-y-Coed, North Wales. Hill died there on 17 February 1930.

Some of his works are held in the National Gallery of Ireland. The majority of his paintings are held in private collections.
