= Patrick Collins (painter) =

Irish painter (1911–1994)

Patrick Collins (1911–1994) was one of Ireland's foremost painters of the 20th century.

He was elected HRHA (Honorary Member of the Royal Hibernian Academy) in 1980 and a member of the artists' academy Aosdána in 1981. He had a major retrospective exhibition hosted by Ireland's Arts Council (Cork, Belfast, Dublin) in 1982. Several solo exhibitions followed, including a Retrospective at Sligo Art Gallery in 1985. Two years later, Collins was the first visual artist to be honoured with the accolade Saoi by Aosdána, in recognition of his outstanding contribution to the visual arts in Ireland. In 1988 he received an Honorary Doctorate of Literature from Trinity College, Dublin.

His paintings have been exhibited widely in Ireland and in Europe, and are held in many public and private collections of Irish painting worldwide.

"Patrick Collins has made a unique contribution to painting in our time by his power to evoke an aspect of Ireland which captures not only the primary image of the place and the people, but also its spiritual content. His grey-blue landscapes contain images of households, farms and figures, which emerge with a curious imprecise shape that is ultimately seen to be marked by folk-memory and by legend. Like a poet with words, his images penetrate areas beyond exact statement or description – they belong to the area of suggestion and imagination which cannot be identified outside the realm of his own idiom." (James White, Chairman of the Arts Council in the foreword to "Patrick Collins" by Frances Ruane)

== Life ==
=== Biographical outline ===
1910	Born in Dromore West, Co. Sligo, lived in Riverstown and Sligo.
1925	School: St. Vincent's C.B.S., Glasnevin, Dublin
	Later worked for the Irish Life Insurance Company
	Studied briefly at the National College of Art and Design with George Collie RHA and at the National College of Art
1950	First exhibits at the Irish Exhibition of Living Art (IELA)
	Exhibits with IELA yearly until 1972
1956	First one-man show, Ritchie Hendriks Gallery, Dublin
	Exhibits with Hendriks until 1973
1958	Won the National Award in Guggenheim Award Exhibition, New York
1962	First exhibits at the Royal Hibernian Academy
1964	First exhibits in Oireachtas Exhibition; exhibits regularly there until 1973 and rarely afterwards
1971	Moves to Paris
	Irish Landscape Prize at the Oireachtas Exhibition
1973	Moves to Orne, Normandy
1974	Exhibits with Tom Caldwell Galleries from hereafter
1976	Moves to Nice
	Receives Irish American Cultural Institute Award
1977	Moves back to Ireland
1980	Elected HRHA – Honorary Member of the Royal Hibernian Academy
1981	Elected by peers as member of Aosdána
1982	Major retrospective exhibition (Cork, Belfast, Dublin)
1985	Retrospective at Sligo Art Gallery
1987	First visual artist to be honoured with the accolade Saoi by Aosdána in recognition of his outstanding contribution to the visual arts in Ireland
1988	Received Honorary Doctorate of Literature from Trinity College, Dublin

== Exhibitions ==
=== Solo exhibitions ===
1956, 1959, 1961, 1963, 1964, 1965, 1967, 1968	Ritchie Hendriks Gallery, Dublin
1968	Mercury Gallery, London
1969, 1970, 1972	David Hendriks Gallery, Dublin
1973	David Hendriks Gallery at Cork Arts Society
1971, 1974, 1976	Tom Caldwell Gallery, Belfast
1975, 1976, 1978, 1979	Tom Caldwell Gallery, Dublin
1982	Collins Retrospective, Douglas Hyde Gallery, Trinity College Dublin (also in Cork and Belfast)
1988, 1989, 1991	Tom Caldwell Gallery, Dublin
2011	"Last Daylight", Royal Hibernian Academy, Dublin

=== Selected group exhibitions ===
1950	Exhibition of Contemporary Irish Painting, North American Tour
1953	Irish Painting 1903–1953, Municipal Gallery of Modern Art, Dublin
	Contemporary Irish Art, Aberystwyth, Wales
1958	Guggenheim Award Exhibition, New York
1963	Twelve Irish Painters, New York
1965	Paintings and Sculpture from Private Collections in Ireland, Municipal Gallery of Modern Art, Dublin
1966	Modern Irish Paintings, Great Southern Hotels and Ulster Museum, Belfast
1969	Contemporary Irish Painting, Wexford Festival
	Exhibition of Modern Irish Painting, Northern European and Irish Tour
1970	Aspects of Landscape by Irish Artists, Irish touring exhibition.
1971	The Irish Imagination, Rosc '71, Municipal Gallery of Modern Art, Dublin
	Paintings from the Collection of An Chomhairle Ealaion, Irish Tour
1972	The Irish Imagination, Boston, Philadelphia and Washington
	Exhibition by Irish Painters, Galerie Braun, Paris
	From Yeats to Ballagh, Kusthalle Lund
	The Gordon Lamberg Collection, Municipal Gallery of Modern Art, Dublin
	Paintings by Irish Artists, Killarney
1976	Irish Art 1900–1950, Cork Rosc 1976, Crawford Municipal Gallery, Cork
	The Gordon Lamberg Collection of Contemporary Art, Ulster Museum, Belfast
1978	Dublin Arts Festival
1979	Contemporary Irish Art, Insurance Corporation of Ireland, Dublin
1980	The Delighted Eye, Arts Councils' Exhibition, London and Irish Tour
	Irish Art 1943–73, Cork Rosc 1980, Crawford Municipal Gallery, Cork and Ulster Museum, Belfast
	The College Gallery 21st Anniversary Retrospective Exhibition, Douglas Hyde Gallery, Trinity College, Dublin
	The Collection of Pat and Antoinette Murphy, Belltable Gallery, Limerick

== Works in collections ==
- Irish National Gallery
  - Liffey Quaysides, 1957-8
- Irish Arts Council:
  - Rising Swan
  - Small Holding on the Side of a Mountain
  - Children Playing
  - Predator Bird
  - Atlantic Window
  - Rain on the Moon
  - Oak Tree
- Arts Council of Northern Ireland
- AIB Collection
  - Travelling Tinkers, 1968
  - A Place with Stones, 1979
  - Table with Exotic Fruit, 1976
- Irish Museum of Modern Art (IMMA) Collection
  - Landscape with Declining Sun (1984)
  - The Wood Pigeon's Nest (1974)
  - Field of Old Stones (1978)
  - Bird Against the Window (1963)
  - Headland (1980)
  - Landscape with Church (1956)
- Bank of Ireland Collection
  - Pigeon House (mouth of the Liffey), 1978
  - Trout Rising, 1978

== See also ==
- Irish art
- List of Irish artists
