= John Kingerlee =

Irish painter (born 1936)

John Kingerlee (born 17 February 1936) is an Irish painter currently living on the Beara peninsula, in West Cork. He is a convert to Islam and has a second family in Fez, Morocco.

== Career ==
=== Early life ===
John Kingerlee was born in Birmingham, England in 1936. His Mother was related to Hogan's from County Cork and he was educated in a school run by the Marist Fathers. After living for twenty years in Cornwall in the far southwest of Britain, he moved in 1982 to an isolated farmhouse on the Beara Peninsula in West Cork, Ireland.

=== Current life and works ===
On the isolated Beara peninsula, looking directly out from his home across Kenmare Bay to the ring of Kerry, John and his wife Mo lead a life which some might describe as lonely. However, what they lack in human contact they make up for through an existence which extends to growing their own vegetables in their organic garden. The Kingerlees' alternative outlook on life somehow seems to be in complete harmony both with the space they inhabit and with the art that flows from John's palette knife and brush.

A non-conformist at heart, John has turned his back on the traditional way of seeing and depicting landscape - as a series of parallel planes that are made to appear to recede from foreground to background by the artist's manipulation of linear and aerial perspective. Recognising that perspective itself is a mathematical construct, John takes a different approach that is as radical as it is original. He states that he wants his art to recreate the experience of being in and moving through the landscape.

A Drawing by John Kingerlee - Notice the reference to Fez (Morocco) at the top

In the studio, using his own made-up pigments, he mimics the cycle of growth and decay by working with matter in a very direct and hands-on way. He applies colours, deep pools of it, red brick, reds, molten silver and zinc, platinum and titanium, sulphuric yellows and so much more to dozens of paintings in various states of becoming. He paints standing up, applying a new layer of paint (finished paintings will comprise fifty to one hundred or more layers of paint applied over a period of several years and when completed can take up to five months to dry out). His preferred tools are palette knives (one in each hand is the norm), and a decorator's brush which he holds vertically using a stippling technique.
