= Eileen Reid (painter) =

Irish painter and musician

- Born: Eileen Florence Beatrice Oulton; 11 February 1894; 19 Upper Mount Street, Dublin
- Died: 8 April 1981 (aged 87); 19 Upper Mount Street, Dublin
- Education: Royal Academy Schools

Eileen Reid (11 February 1894 – 8 April 1981) was an Irish painter and musician.

== Life ==
Eileen Reid was born Eileen Florence Beatrice Oulton on 11 February 1894 at 19 Upper Mount Street, Dublin. She was one of the two children of the Dublin barrister, George Nugent Oulton. She lived at the family home for her whole life. She attended the German High School, Wellington Place, Dublin, and then the Royal Irish Academy of Music. She won the 1910 Coulston exhibition, and the Coulston Academy scholarship in 1911. Her instrument was the piano. She qualified as a music teacher in 1914. It was the family friend, William Orpen, inspired her to start painting. In 1922 she entered the Royal Academy Schools in London.

On 26 June 1923, she married Hugh C. Reid in St Stephen's Church, Dublin. Reid was from London, and worked in the Nigerian colonial service. She had planned to join him in Africa, but he died of a fever on 14 February 1924 before she could do so. Instead, she returned to the Royal Academy, graduating in 1927. She taught music for a living, played the organ at St Stephen's church, while she painted. She painted figures, landscapes, and cityscapes. She initially worked in oils, but later moved in watercolours. She joined the Water Colour Society of Ireland in 1934, and was the group's secretary from 1936 to 1974. She exhibited with the society in the 1930s and 1940s, but later devoted her time to the administrative and organisational activities of the society. In 1970, she oversaw the society's centenary exhibition.

Reid died at home on 8 April 1981. Many of her paintings are held in a number of private Irish collections. A retrospective exhibition was held at the Cynthia O'Connor gallery in 1984.
