= Keith Drury (artist) =

Northern Irish artist

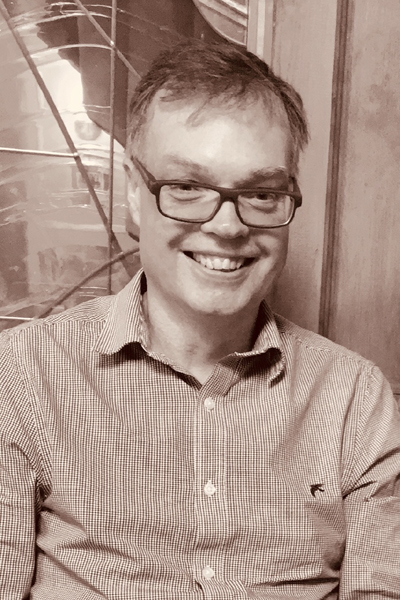
- Born: 1964 (age 61–62); Newtownbreda, Belfast, Northern Ireland
- Education: Queen's University Belfast
- Known for: Painting, 3D modelling
- Notable work: Pelé Portrait (2007), ‘London Way’ presented to HRH Princess Anne (2016).
- Style: Contemporary
- Movement: Member of Visual Artists Ireland https://visualartists.ie/
- Spouse: Dr Deborah Drury (m. 2007)
- Children: 2
- Awards: Winner of International Public Art Commission, Belfast City Council (2010)
- Patrons: Tribe (formerly National Autistic Society)
- Website: www.keithdruryart.com

Keith Drury is a Northern Ireland artist initially known for oil paintings and for cityscapes created by 3D modelling. Many of his early oil on canvas artworks gained national media attention. He is now best known for his intricate and highly coloured urban landscapes. He lives in Belfast.

== Life and education ==
Keith Alan Drury was born to Joseph and Maureen (née Morrissey) Drury, in the Newtownbreda area of Belfast. His father was Assistant Director for Nursing Services.

Drury's elementary education was at Newtownbreda Primary School and his secondary education was completed at Annadale Grammar School. He went on to graduate from Queen's University Belfast with an Honours degree in Business and Economics (BSSc Hons) before working at Short Brothers and in the National Health Service. Returning to QUB, he graduated with a bachelor's degree in Theology (BDiv Hons) from Union Theological College and became an ordained minister with the Presbyterian Church in Ireland. During this period, Drury was the Minister of May Street Church Belfast and served as a board member of Belfast City Centre Management working with the Chamber of Commerce and the Department for Regional Development. After 19 years in ministry, he resigned to become a professional artist in 2009. During this time, Drury combined art with graphic design and book publishing before his 3D modelling style became successful and he was able to work full-time as an artist.

The majority of Drury's art is created at his home studio but his work can be viewed and purchased online, or at his gallery (open to the public) on the Belmont Road in East Belfast.

== Social commentary ==
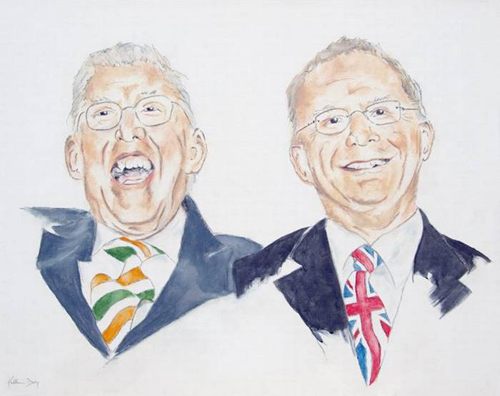
'Chuckle Brothers' - Paisley & McGuinness (oil on canvas)

Drury went professional as an artist in 2009. His early works were mainly oil on canvas and some featured controversial subjects, or included political and religious commentary.

One portrait showed a Democratic Unionist (DUP) politician, Iris Robinson, wife of former First Minister of Northern Ireland in a 'Marilyn Monroe pose'. Another depicted former DUP leader, Ian Paisley, wearing an Irish Tricolour tie, alongside his opposite number, Sinn Féin's Martin McGuinness in a Union Flag tie. This oil painting was entitled, ‘The Chuckle Brothers’ and illustrated how two key figures from opposing political parties in the Northern Irish conflict could form an unlikely friendship and help to bring about peace and reconciliation, despite deep-seated differences.

In 2010 Drury exhibited an oil painting in the Marketplace Theatre and Arts Centre in Armagh which alluded to the child abuse scandal in the Roman Catholic Church. It pictured Cardinal Sean Brady, head of the Catholic Church in Ireland, who was involved in an alleged cover-up, wearing a baby's dummy (pacifier) instead of a crucifix. There were calls for the portrait to be removed from public display. Defending his work, Drury told the press that although people could choose to take offence, the painting could be viewed in a variety of ways.

== Signature style ==
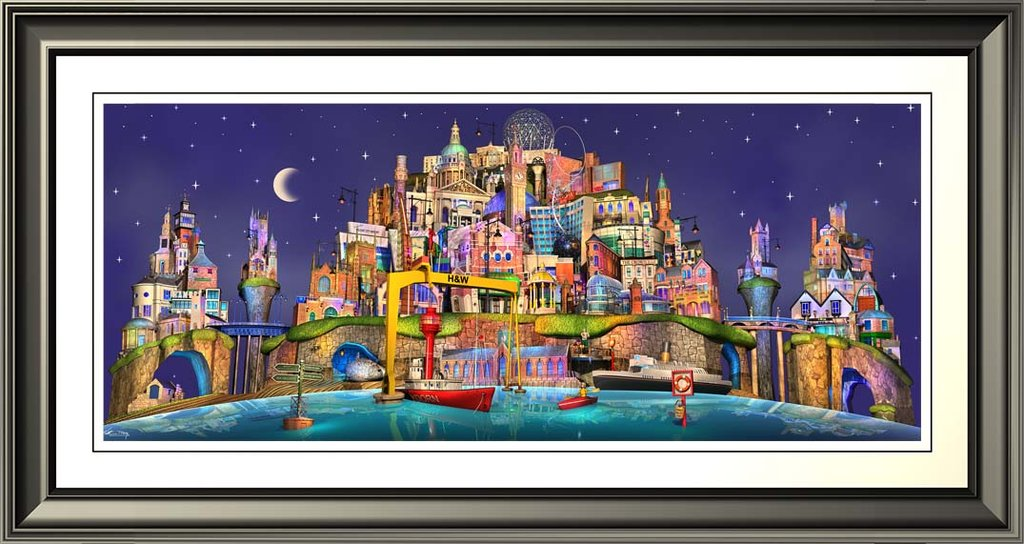
‘Norn Island’

Drury is now best known for his signature style which involves producing vibrant artworks using 3D modelling. He uses this technique to produce urban landscapes and cityscapes, depicting well-known local landmarks. Each picture can take up to three months to complete due to the complex modelling process and the high levels of detail included. Most of the scenes include a red telephone box, a red postbox and a clock which tells the same time. Drury deliberates for hours on inconsequential details such as a perforated brake disc on a Harley-Davidson motorbike. Many British and international towns and cities are featured in the artworks. Many of these pieces focus on Northern Irish landmarks, including Drury’s home city of Belfast. The artist’s unique artistic depiction of Northern Ireland reinvents the country in a vibrant and celebratory way following a long political conflict known as ‘The Troubles’.

== Commissions, awards & exhibitions ==
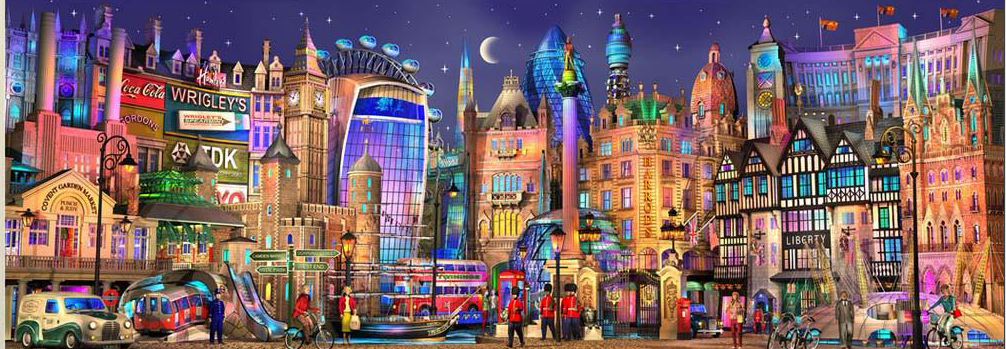
‘London Way’

Commissions and Notable Presentations

Drury presented an oil painting to Mary McAleese (then President of Ireland) in 2005 at a private dinner at her official state residence Áras an Uachtaráin in Dublin.

In 2007, Drury was commissioned by Irish author and film/documentary-maker, Don Mullan, to paint a portrait of Brazilian footballer Pelé. Drury personally presented the completed oil painting to Pelé at a Pelé Pequeno Principe Research event he hosted in Dublin.

Drury was commissioned to create a portrait of the newly inaugurated 44th US president Barack Obama in 2009. It was presented to The President's Club Charitable Trust in Belfast on the day of the US presidential inauguration. Later that year Drury travelled to Southampton to meet 97 year old Millvina Dean, the youngest passenger and last remaining survivor of the RMS Titanic disaster. He was the last person to officially interview her as she died a few days later.

In 2010, Drury won an international competition to produce a public commission artwork for Belfast City Council. The completed work is a collection of portraits interpreting the Irish history and heritage of Belfast. The piece's Irish title is: ‘Ar scath a cheile a mhaireas na daoine’ (‘It is in the shelter of each other that people live’) and features five prominent Belfast Irish cultural revivalists. This mixed media artwork is on permanent public display as part of the city's art collection at Belfast City Hall.

In 2016, London Way was presented to Princess Anne at a reception in Buckingham Palace.

The United States Ambassador to Ireland, Claire Cronin, presented Dublin Lane to outgoing treasurer of the Washington Ireland Program, Eugene Hillary, at the Ambassador's official residence in Dublin in 2024. Later the same year, Phil Mauger, Mayor of Christchurch, was presented with Christchurch Landing for display at Christchurch Town Hall, New Zealand.

Television, Media and Publications

In 2016, Holywood Boulevard, appeared in the BBC drama The Fall.

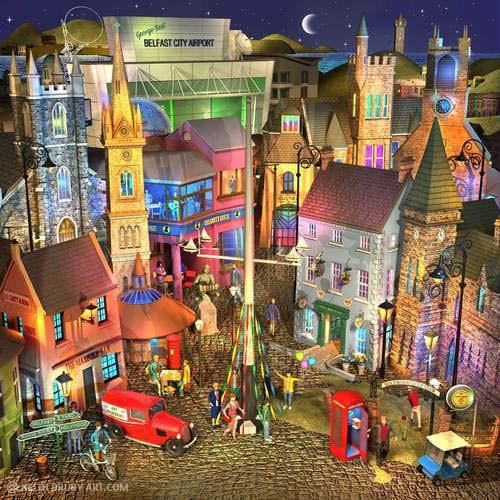
'Holywood Boulevard'

Drury's prints have also featured as part of a backdrop in BBC crime series, Line of Duty.

In 2019, a collection of artworks from Drury's Liverpool series featured in The Liverpool Art Book (Bloomsbury Publishing).

In 2021, his ‘Rainfall Series’ (oil on canvas) paintings, depicting iconic Belfast buildings, featured in the ITV production Marcella.

Early in 2025, following his decision to go public with his diagnosis of autism, Drury was interviewed by the Head of the BBC in Northern Ireland, Adam Smyth, at a special launch of his neurodiversity art series. Subsequently, the BBC featured Drury's story across all of their news platforms in Northern Ireland.

UTV Life interviewed Keith about his charitable partnership with the Odyssey Trust to raise funds for the Hospice in Northern Ireland in May 2025.

Corporate Commissions

The National Trust commissioned Drury to create an artwork to promote and celebrate a Van Morrison music festival, Back in Down, at the Castle Ward Estate in 2013.

In June 2018, MJM Marine commissioned an artwork to mark the launch of their contract to refurbish the Azamara Pursuit cruise ship. Drury presented the completed piece to then President and CEO of Azamara Club Cruises, Larry Pimentel at the Titanic Hotel

Danske Bank commissioned an artwork in September 2018 and Bunzl McLaughlin (part of Bunzl plc) presented Drury's 'Up the Farset' artwork to the Hastings Hotel Group later the same year.

Drury's art was part of a nationwide advertising and marketing campaign for The Boulevard in 2022 in collaboration with BWP Group.

In 2023, Drury was commissioned by Hardy Distribution to create a bespoke customisation for Boost Drinks to celebrate the company's twentieth anniversary in business.

Drury collaborated with The Odyssey Trust in 2025, working with the ‘Belfast Giants’, (the first professional ice hockey team in Ireland), to publish a bespoke artwork featuring the team.

SSP Group commissioned Drury to create a special installation mural for ‘Flax and Soda’, in the departure’s lounge at Belfast International Airport in 2026. The piece was entitled, ‘Best of Belfast’ and Keith said he wanted the artwork to ‘capture the colour, detail and flavour of Belfast, its creativity, its people and its ingenuity throughout the years.’

Awards and Recognition

2026: Official Art Partner of the Belfast Giants.

2025: Hummingbird Awards (NI): Shortlisted for Inspirational Role Model for efforts to champion equality, diversity and inclusion.

2023: UK Government and Northern Ireland Office: In recognition of Drury's contribution to the Arts, a special invitation was issued to attend a reception hosted by then British Prime Minister, Rishi Sunak, at 10 Downing Street to celebrate the culture of Northern Ireland.

2022: Ulster Tatler Awards: Nominated for Arts Personality of the Year.

2010: Belfast City Council: Winner of an international art competition to interpret the history and heritage of Belfast. This mixed media painting is on permanent public display at Belfast City Hall as part of the city's art collection.

Exhibitions

2025 - 2026: The Observatory, Grand Central Hotel Urban Landscapes (solo exhibition).

2025: The Long Gallery, Parliament Buildings Stormont, We’re All Mad Here (solo exhibition/mixed media).

2025: Ards Arts Centre We’re All Mad Here (solo exhibition/mixed media).

2024-2025: Montalto Estate Bohemians & Cityscapes (solo exhibition/mixed media).

2024: Isaac Theatre Royal New Zealand Christchurch Landing (solo exhibition/ 3D art on canvas).

2022: Titanic Hotel The Frida Series, Belfast and North Coast Highlights (solo exhibition/mixed media).

2018: Grand Opera House A Showcase of 3D Cityscapes: Belfast, Dublin and London (solo exhibition/3D art on canvas).

2018: The Old Inn Celebrating the Best of N.Ireland in 3D (solo exhibition/ 3D art).

2010: The Marketplace Theatre and Arts Centre Up Your Street and In Your Face exhibition of a range of satirical portraits featuring political and religious figures (solo exhibition/ oil on canvas).

2009: The Waterfront Hall Iconic Belfast Buildings (group exhibition/oil on canvas).

== Philanthropic activity ==
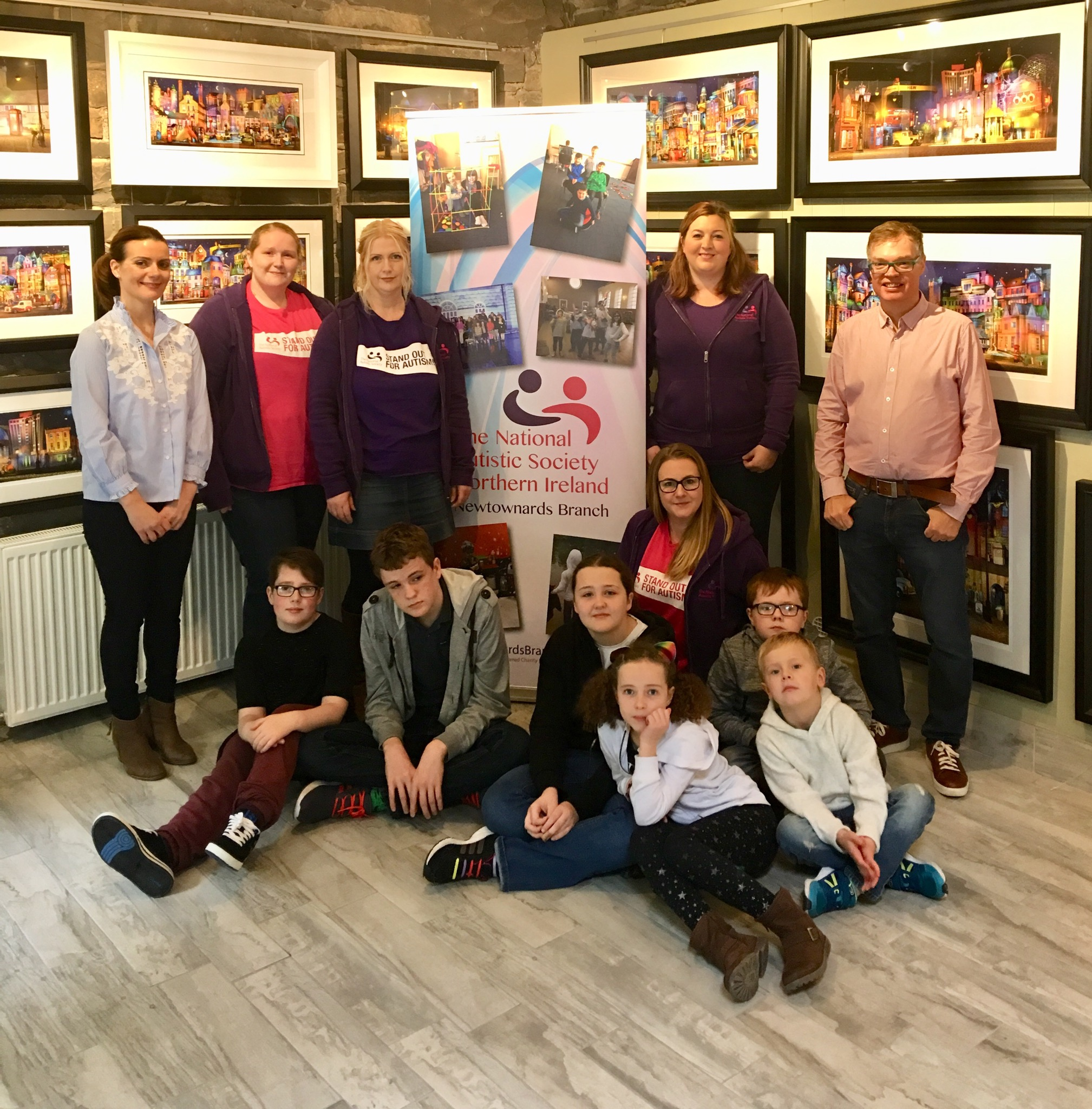
Drury is a Patron of the National Autistic Society in Northern Ireland

Keith, along with his wife, Deborah, and former staff member, Matthew McComb, (a games developer with Asperger syndrome), were involved in a doctoral research project at Queen's University Belfast. They developed a virtual reality (VR) programme using specially created scenes in 3D to assist children with autism. This innovative project used 3D models of Keith's art to create a virtual learning environment to help autistic children improve their coping mechanisms when faced with uncertain situations.

Drury was formally diagnosed with autism in 2023. The complex detail and intricate patterns in his art have been attributed to a talent made possible by his neurodiversity. Keith and his wife, Dr Deborah Drury, are Ambassadors of ‘Tribe’ (formerly the National Autistic Society (NAS) for Ards and North Down) and have assisted with educational workshops, donations and fundraising efforts for other local charities and schools in Northern Ireland.

In 2025, The Odyssey Trust commissioned Giants Bay - a bespoke artwork featuring the renowned ice hockey team Belfast Giants . As well as this special edition artwork, Keith created a designer jersey for a celebrity ice hockey event known as Hospice Hockey held at the SSE Arena to raise funds for the Northern Ireland Hospice

His ‘Belfast Bay’ artwork was specially customised to celebrate Mencap's 80th anniversary in Northern Ireland. This piece was donated to Mencap and subsequently auctioned to raise funds for the charity at their annual Race Day at Down Royal in June 2026. Mencap’s state-of-art educational facility also marked ten years in 2026 and is built on the former site of Newtownbreda Primary School, where Keith was a pupil in his formative years. Keith was interviewed in the Long Gallery, Parliament Buildings, about the artwork which was on exhibition during Learning Disability Week.

Drury designs a bespoke charity Christmas card each year and has raised significant funds for local charities in Northern Ireland through this initiative. He is also well known for donating many of his artworks to support charitable causes across the U.K.

New Work

‘We’re All Mad Here’ was published in 2025 exploring issues related to neurodiversity and mental health. This mixed media series (3D and oil on canvas) is based on a modern interpretation of the character of Alice from Lewis Carroll's novel, Alice's Adventures in Wonderland and is diverse in style, colour and composition. The intention behind this new work is to open conversations and raise awareness of issues related to mental health.
