= Robert Carver (painter) =

Irish water-colour painter

- Born: circa 1730; Dublin, Ireland
- Died: 14 November 1791 (aged 60–61); Bow Street, Covent Garden, London

Robert Carver (c. 1730–1791) was an Irish painter, who worked as a painter of theatre scenery as well as painting framed works. Carver was one of the leading landscape painters in the second half of eighteenth century Ireland.

== Life ==
Robert Carver was born in Dublin circa 1730. His father was Richard Carver (died 1754), who was a landscape and history painter born in Waterford. Carver was initially trained by his father, and later studied under Robert West at West's school on George's Lane, Dublin. During his early career, Carver's address was at Lazar's Hill, Dublin.

Carver was married to Anne Jolly. Their only known child was a son, John Carver, who died in 1766. Carver suffered from gout for a number of years. Carver died of pneumonia on 14 November 1791 at his home at 13 Bow Street, Covent Garden. He is buried at the churchyard of St Paul's, Covent Garden.

== Career ==
An Arcadian Landscape with Travellers and Herdsmen in the Distance, Oil on canvas, 37 x 48¼ in, 94 x 122.5 cm, Signed with initials and dated 'R.C. 1764'

He began exhibiting watercolours in Dublin, which were well received. In a Cork theatre, Carver painted scenery and in 1754, he succeeded John Lewis as scenery painter at Smock Alley Theatre, where he painted a wide array of scenery. He would later be employed by the revived rival theatre in Crow Street where he painted for Spranger Barry among others. His sets for the 1766 King Arthur was reported: "the sudden Changes of the beautiful Variety of Scenery, seemed to surprise and alarm the Audience, as the effect of real Magic". Carver worked with Thomas Sheridan in converting a barn into a theatre for a staging of Jack the giant-queller at Longfield, most likely in County Londonderry. Carver exhibited 20 landscapes with the Society of Artists, Dublin between 1765 and 1768.

Carver moved to London around 1769 and was hired by David Garrick as the head scene painter at Drury Lane, possibly at the recommendation of Barry. Here his work was highly regarded and received much praise. His relocation to London was financed by a benefit night at Crow Street theatre. For unknown reasons, Barry was dismissed from the theatre, and in 1775 Carver followed Barry to Covent Garden Theatre. There he worked with John Inigo Richards and trained Henry Hodgins. He worked there for the rest of his life. Two of his most notable sets at Covent Garden were Touchstone in 1779 and The siege of Gibraltar in 1780. He also worked at Brighton Theatre in 1777.

Between 1765 and 1768 Carver sent twenty paintings to the Free Society's exhibitions in London. He became a member there in 1773 and President of the society in 1777. Carver exhibited with the Royal Academy in 1789 and 1790. At the time of his death, Carver was completing a series of paintings for his patron Lord Altamont in Westport, County Mayo.
