= Neiland =

Neiland is a surname. Notable people with the surname include:

- Brendan Neiland (born 1941), English artist
- Larisa Neiland (born 1966), Latvian tennis player
- John Neiland, 16th century Anglican priest in Ireland
