= Andrew Park (animator) =

English animator

Andrew Park FRSA (born in south London, United Kingdom) is an English animator best known for making a 14-part series of 10-minute whiteboard animations for the Royal Society of Arts's channel theRSAorg which became the No.1 nonprofit channel worldwide with 46 million views.

== Career ==
2004 - Andrew Park registers Cognitive; a Whiteboard Animation Studio (where all animations are hand-drawn) 2007 - Earliest professional commission for UPS 2009 - Andrew Park starts work on the RSA Animates 2011 - RSA Animates achieve 46 million views on YouTube 2025 - RSA Animates achieved 100 million views on YouTube

== RSA Animate ==
Andrew Park created the original concept and design for the RSA Animate cartoon series that has transferred the contents of RSA speeches and books to the medium of (hand-drawn) cartoon animations.

The first whiteboard animation drawn by Andrew Park in the RSA Animate series was based on Stein Ringen's Book, "The Economic Consequences of Mr Brown" given as a speech delivered for RSA.

The most recently drawn is based on a 500-page book by psychiatrist Iain McGilchrist on the topic of the divided (human) brain.

== Other notable work ==
Andrew Park was chosen by Bill Gates to illustrate his Gates Foundation lecture on the power of vaccines. Since his work on the RSA Animates series, Andrew Park has gone on to create further animations for the RSA and other high-profile organizations. Created at his animation company Cognitive, these have reached wide audiences and appeared on national media outlets.
