= David Joseph =

David Joseph may refer to:

- David Joseph (basketball), Canadian basketball coach
- David Joseph (executive), English corporate executive
- David C. Joseph (born 1977), American judge

== See also ==
- Dave Joseph (born 1969), West Indian cricketer
