= Nathaniel Grogan =

Irish painter

- Born: c. 1740; Cork, Ireland
- Died: 1807 (aged 66–67); Cork

Nathaniel Grogan (the Elder) (1740–1807) was an Irish painter from Cork, and one of the most important Irish genre painters of the late 18th century.

== Life and family ==
Nathaniel Grogan was born around 1740 in Cork. He was originally an apprentice to his father, a turner and block maker, but he had a love for the arts and taught himself to draw. His early works were in chalk on board, as they were the only materials available. He trained in Cork under the local painter John Butts, and was influenced by Dutch painters such as Hobbema and Heemskerck. He was strongly discouraged from pursuing art by his father, which led to him eventually leaving home.

Once established as an artist in Cork, Grogan lived on the south side of the Mardyke in a small house. He died there in 1807, and is buried at the church of Saint Finnbarr. Grogan had 19 children, but only 2 surviving sons, Nathaniel (c. 1756–1825) and Joseph. Both his sons also achieved some success as a painters and were known for making copies of their father's works.

== Career ==
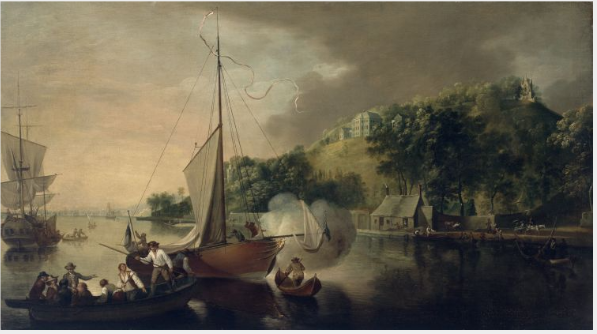
Boats on the River Lee below Tivoli, County Cork (c. 1785) by Grogan

He enlisted in the British army and served in America during the War of Independence and in the West Indies. Little is known of the paintings he produced during this period but advertisements have been found in the Pennsylvania Ledger of December 1777 offering "sign and ornamental painting". Having returned to Ireland, he painted decorations in houses, such as the walls, doors, and ceilings of Mount Vernon for Mr Lane.

He went on to produce numerous oil and watercolour paintings depicting landscapes and genre scenes of his native Cork. His Winter Scene with Skaters is seen as one of his better works. He is notable for his works depicting "Irish peasant life" which was an unusual subject for Irish painters during this period and show the influence of Dutch genre painting and of the English artists, George Morland and Henry Walton. Grogan's genre paintings, often humorous, offer a rare depiction of social life in the lower classes during this time with Anne Crookshank and the Knight of Glin stating that Grogan's genre paintings were "the most important paintings of Irish peasant life of the period in existence".

He exhibited 4 landscapes with the Free Society of Artists in London in 1782, which led him to spend some time in London. He also etched some bookplates. His best known etchings were a set of 12 views of Cork in mezzotint, and an engraving of a portrait of Catherine Fitzgerald, countess of Desmond. Grogan was mentioned in Maria Edgeworth's correspondence, citing 2 works of his that were of interest to her. He was also popular with collectors in Ireland.

== Legacy ==
The first exhibition of the Cork Society for Promoting the Fine Arts in 1815 exhibited 25 paintings by Grogan. 18 works by Grogan, including a self-portrait were featured in the 1852 Cork Exhibition. Walter G. Strickland states that he "enjoyed a considerable reputation in Cork; but his art is crude and hardly deserves the encomiums it received" and believed that further training would have improved his work and allowed him to gain success outside of Cork due to his natural talent. However, his work has been reappraised and is now regarded as one of the most significant provincial Irish painters of the late 18th century.

View of Cork, in the collection of the city's Crawford Art Gallery, was previously believed to be by Grogan, and is now attributed to his teacher, John Butts. Some paintings attributed to Grogan the elder have been reevaluated in the 21st century as possibly by his son, Nathaniel, who is considered to be a better figure painter than his father.

Grogan's Whipping the Herring out of Town – A Scene of Cork was selected as number 47 in the Cork in 50 Artworks series by the Irish Examiner.

== Selected works ==
- The Bantry Bard
- The Itinerant Preacher
- The Cronies
- The Wake
- The Quoit Players
- Irish Fair
