= VideoScribe =

Video software

- Developer: Sparkol
- Release: March 2012; 14 years ago
- Operating system: Windows 7 or newer, Mac OS X 10.6 or higher.
- Type: Whiteboard animation software
- Website: www.videoscribe.co

VideoScribe is a drag-and-drop whiteboard animation software. It is known primarily for its hand-drawn animation style and has remained popular with its subscribers for enabling the creation of animated video content with few skills or prior knowledge required.

The software is popularly used for creating explainer videos, marketing videos, internal communications videos, as well as branded or promotional videos for social media. VideoScribe content is also widely used within the education sector, with users creating video as teaching & learning curriculum content, and by students to deliver assignments, projects and homework.

== History ==
VideoScribe was launched in 2012 by UK-based company Sparkol. By April 2014 it had more than 250,000 users in 135 countries worldwide. VideoScribe is available as a desktop or browser version.

== Features ==
VideoScribe is available as a browser or desktop application. These are distinguished as two different products as they have some differing features. VideoScribe for Desktop can be used without Wi-Fi or internet access. It is developed using Apache Flex and Harman Air. Video files can be exported to QuickTime, wmv or avi video, or image sequences (JPEG or PNG).

VideoScribe for browser includes more regular feature updates and includes features such as scene functionality and canvas size options. VideoScribe for Browser can export videos in MP4 or GIF format.

VideoScribe allows a seven-day free trial after which users can buy VideoScribe Plus or Pro licences; which give users rights for commercial and resell use. Subscriptions can be purchased on a monthly or yearly basis.

The browser software features selections of ready-made customizable video templates and access to over 5 million image assets.

== Notable uses ==
- In April 2013, American school children used VideoScribe to create a message for Barack Obama, pleading with the US President to reinstate their tour of the White House after it was cancelled by federal budget cuts.
- UK Chancellor George Osborne narrated a scribe to explain the Spending Round on the British Government website in June 2013. The following month, VideoScribe was recommended on the BBC News website.
- Mashable have used VideoScribe to make several whiteboard videos for their website.
