= Royal Society of Arts =

British organisation

Coordinates: 51°30′34″N 0°7′22″W

- Royal Society for the Encouragement of Arts, Manufactures and Commerce
- Abbreviation: RSA
- Established: 1754; 272 years ago
- Founder: William Shipley
- Founded at: London, England
- Type: Registered charity
- Legal status: Royal Charter Company
- Headquarters: 8 John Adam Street; London, WC2N 6EZ
- Fields: Arts and culture
- Members: 30,000+ fellows
- Official language: English
- Chairman: Sir Loyd Grossman
- CEO: David Joseph
- Patron: Princess Anne, the Princess Royal
- Website: www.thersa.org
- Formerly called: Society for the Encouragement of Arts, Manufactures and Commerce

The Royal Society for the Encouragement of Arts, Manufactures and Commerce, commonly known as the Royal Society of Arts (RSA), is a London-based organization.

The RSA's mission expressed in the founding charter was to "embolden enterprise, enlarge science, refine art, improve our manufacturers and extend our commerce", but also of the need to alleviate poverty and secure full employment.

Notable Fellows (before 1914, called Members) include Charles Dickens, Benjamin Franklin, Charles Lennox, 3rd Duke of Richmond; Edmund Burke, Adam Smith, Karl Marx, Marie Curie, Stephen Hawking, Nelson Mandela, David Attenborough, Judi Dench, William Hogarth, John Diefenbaker, and Tim Berners-Lee. Today, the RSA has fellows elected from 80 countries worldwide.

== History ==
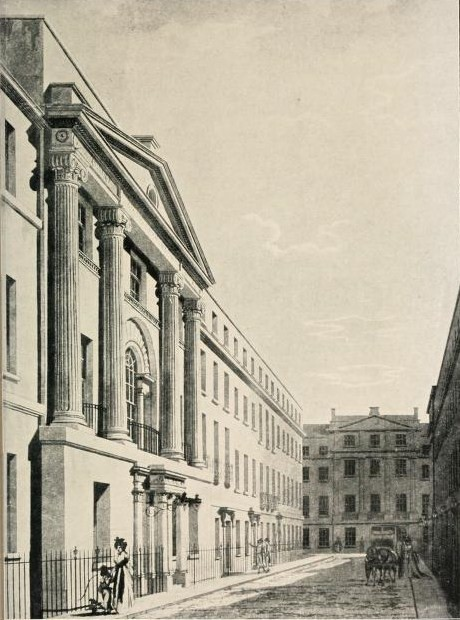
The RSA building (18th-century engraving)

Founded in 1754 by William Shipley as the Society for the Encouragement of Arts, Manufactures and Commerce, the organization was granted a Royal Charter in 1847 and the right to use the term "Royal" in its name by King Edward VII in 1908. It thus became the Royal Society of Arts. Members of the society became known as "Fellows" beginning in 1914. The RSA would be referred to by a variety of names, such as the "Premium Society" and the "Society of Arts and Sciences".

=== Society for the Encouragement of Arts, Manufactures and Commerce ===
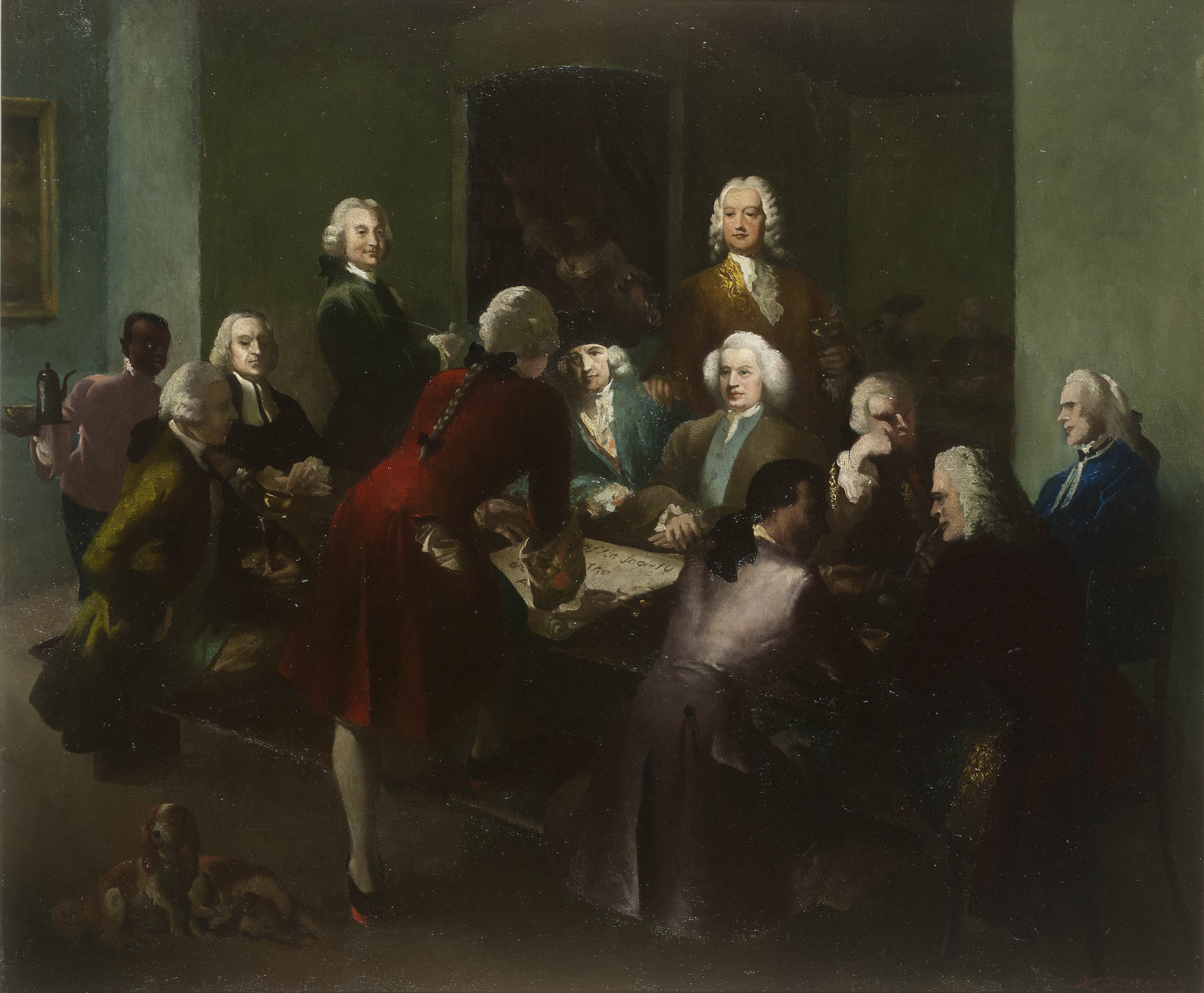
The First Meeting of the Society of Arts at Rawthmell's Coffee House, 22 March 1754

In 1753, William Shipley – a little-known drawing master in Northampton – had the idea of stimulating industry by means of prizes funded by public-spirited people. Through mutual friends in London he was introduced to the Rev. Dr. Stephen Hales, FRS, a distinguished scientist. Hales liked the idea and asked Shipley to put his proposals in writing while Hales contacted two important colleagues, Viscount Folkestone and Lord Romney, to seek their assistance.

In 1753, Shipley wrote proposals calling for the use of prizes and premiums to boost industry and promote innovation. Shipley produced two leaflets: "Proposals for raising by subscription a fund to be distributed in Premiums for the promoting of improvements in the liberal arts and sciences, manufactures, etc." and "A scheme for putting the Proposals in execution". These were privately circulated in London before Shipley moved to live there. He visited Lord Romney and was assured of his and Folkestone's support. After months of canvassing Shipley called the first meeting, which was held at Rawthmell's Coffee House, at 25 Henrietta Street, Covent Garden on 22 March 1754.

The following year, the first meeting of the society was held at Rawthmell’s Coffee House, on Henrietta Street in Covent Garden. Shipley and ten others attended, including Stephen Hales, who had introduced Shipley to Viscount Folkestone and Lord Romney, both of whom were present and would act as the first presidents of the society and the earliest patrons.

The name "Society for the Encouragement of Arts, Manufactures and Commerce" was adopted, but this title was later changed to "The Society of Arts". The organisation grew in its first few years from the original 11 members to about 3,000; ladies became members quite early on, as Shipley had wished. Viscount Folkestone was the first President (1755–1761) and Lord Romney the second (1761–1793). Samuel More was the society's Secretary from 1768 to his death in 1799.

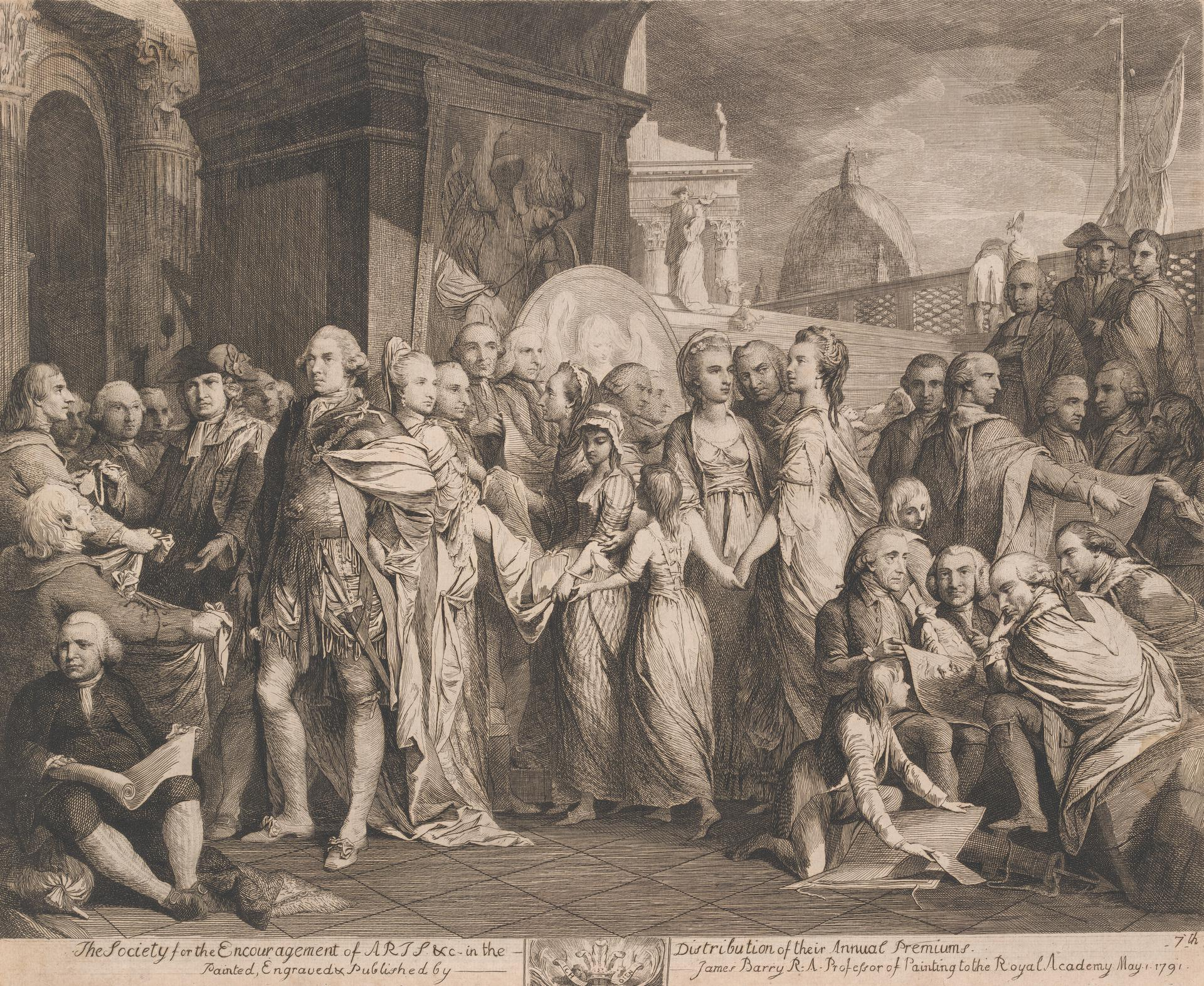
James Barry, "Distribution of Premiums in the Society of Arts", 1777-84

American scientist Benjamin Franklin became a corresponding member in 1756, then in person in London when he was a representative of the colony of Pennsylvania. Charles Lennox, 3rd Duke of Richmond also became a member around the same time and the two became friends. Thomas Paine met Franklin there, as did the Duke of Richmond. For Richmond, the society was a stable and reliable way to socialize outside the aristocracy, with scientists and political thinkers. Franklin came to view the Society as counter to the interests of America writing, "What you call Bounties...are nothing more than Inducements offered us, to induce us to leave Employments that are more profitable and engage in such as would be less...to quit a Business profitable to ourselves and engage in one as shall be profitable to you".

For the first two decades the Society used various premises, mostly in the Charing Cross area. Then, in 1772–74, the Adam brothers (Robert and James) built the present house for the Society, which has occupied it ever since. The property, at 6 John Adam Street, was completed on 24 April 1774; the Society was initially a tenant but bought the building in 1922.

One of the Society’s greatest achievements in the nineteenth century was its close involvement with establishing The Great Exhibition of the Works of Industry of All Nations of 1851 in London. Prince Albert was president of the Society when, in 1845, he suggested to some of the members the idea of "forming in England great Periodical Exhibitions of the Products of Industry." Its subsequent organisation was handled by a Royal Commission, with extensive involvement of several members of the Society, including Henry Cole, Francis Henry, George Wallis, Charles Dilke and other members of the society as a celebration of modern industrial technology and design. During this period the Society received its Royal Charter.

==== Early meetings ====
Members attending the first fifteen meetings of the Society
Name	Age	Notes
Henry Baker FRS	56	Naturalist.
Gustavus Brander FRS	34	Naturalist.
Nicholas Crisp	50	Proprietor of the Vauxhall porcelain factory.
Lord Folkestone	60	English politician of Huguenot descent. First President.
John Goodchild		Prosperous linen draper, Hales' neighbour in Twickenham, and Society's first Treasurer.
Stephen Hales FRS	77	Distinguished scientist. Vice-President.
Husband Messiter		Physician, died 1785.
Lord Romney	42	Vice-President.
William Shipley	38	The Society's first Secretary.
James Short FRS	44	Scottish mathematician and telescope maker.
James Theobald FRS	66	Merchant and natural historian. Vice-President.
Charles Lawrence		
Charles Whitworth	33	British MP, later Sir Charles. Expert in statistics and finance. Vice-President.
Isaac Maddox	57	Bishop of Worcester, formerly Bishop of St Asaph.

The Society met 15 times in the period 22 March 1754 through 5 February 1755, with three members attending 10 or more times (Goodchild, Messiter and Shipley) and some only once or twice (Lawrence, Brander, Hales and the Bishop of Worcester)

=== Royal Society ===
In 1908 the Society became the Royal Society for the Encouragement of Arts, Manufactures and Commerce. Today it is more commonly known as the Royal Society of Arts or the RSA.

In September 2023, RSA workers voted to strike for the first time in the organization's 270 year history, saying management had entered into pay negotiations in "bad faith".

== Journal ==
- RSA Journal, 1987-2025
- Journal of the Royal Society of Arts, 1908-1987
- The Journal of the Society of Arts, 1852-1908
- Transactions of the Society, Instituted at London, for the Encouragement of Arts, Manufactures, and Commerce, 1783-1843

Journals cover many aspects of social progress, including mobility, urbanism, environmental sustainability, as well as the arts, including collaboration of societal challenges and creative solutions.

They may foster a shift towards appreciation for societal well-being. RSA Journals are dedicated to balancing efficiency and productivity with restoration and regeneration. They stress the importance of humans needing to have access to places to escape the busyness of life and be in nature.

== Leadership ==
The RSA's current patron is Anne, Princess Royal. She replaced her father, Prince Philip, Duke of Edinburgh, as President in 2011. The chairman is Loyd Grossman, who was appointed in 2024. The chief executive since September 2025 is former chairman and chief executive of Universal Music UK, David Joseph.

=== Presidents ===
- 1755–61: Jacob Bouverie, 1st Viscount Folkestone
- 1761–93: Robert Marsham, 2nd Baron Romney
- 1794–1815: Charles Howard, 11th Duke of Norfolk
- 1816–43: Prince Augustus Frederick, Duke of Sussex
- 1843–61: Albert, Prince Consort
- 1862: William Tooke
- 1863–1901: Albert Edward, Prince of Wales
- 1901: Sir Frederick Bramwell
- 1901–10: George, Prince of Wales
- 1910–10: Richard Webster, 1st Viscount Alverstone
- 1911–42: Prince Arthur, Duke of Connaught and Strathearn
- 1942–43: Sir Edward Crowe
- 1943–45: E. F. Armstrong
- 1945–47: Richard, Viscount Bennett
- 1947–52: Elizabeth, Duchess of Edinburgh
- 1952–2011: Prince Philip, Duke of Edinburgh
- 2011–present: Anne, Princess Royal

== Fellowship ==
Fellowship is granted to applicants "who are aligned with the RSA's vision and share in our values". Some prospective fellows are approached by the RSA and invited to join in recognition of their work; some are nominated or "fast-tracked" by existing fellows and RSA staff, or by partner organisations such as the Churchill Fellowship; others make their own applications with accompanied references, which are reviewed by a formal admissions panel consisting of RSA trustees and fellowship councillors.

Fellows of the RSA are entitled to use the post-nominal letters FRSA. They also gain access to the RSA Library and to other premises in central London. Fellows pay an annual charitable subscription to the RSA. Alongside this, all new Fellows pay a one-off registration fee.

== Prizes ==
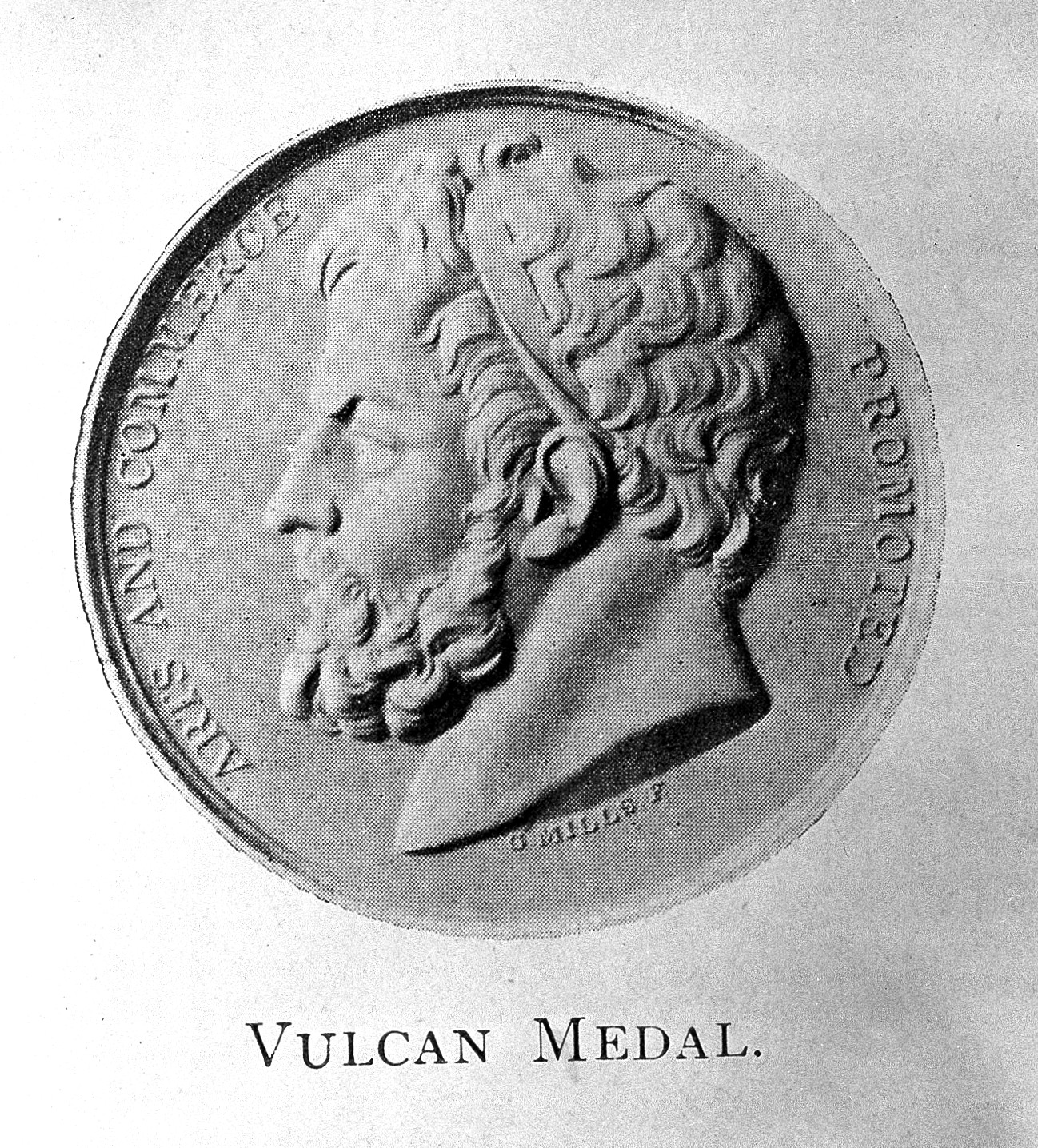
Vulcan medal from the Royal Society of Arts

Originally modelled on the Dublin Society for improving Husbandry, Manufacturers and other Useful Arts, the RSA, from its foundation, offered prizes through a Premium Award Scheme that continued for 100 years. Medals and, in some cases, money, were awarded to individuals who achieved success in published challenges within the categories of Agriculture, Polite Arts, Manufacture, Colonies and Trade, Chemistry and Mechanics. Premiums were offered for four specific purposes:

- For the best quantity of cobalt produced in Great Britain
- For raising and curing not less than 20 pounds of madder
- For the best drawing by a child under 14 years of age
- For the best drawing by a child between 14 and 17

The aim of the first two was to encourage domestic production of two very important raw materials, then being imported at great cost; and to make available cheap dyestuffs, to avoid having textiles dyed abroad. The third and fourth were to encourage a supply of draughtsmen, especially for creating designs in the textile industry. The first premium list was a trial effort. Soon afterwards the members involved developed eight quite searching criteria for deciding how and to whom to award prizes. They ranged from deciding whether the proposal for an award had more than local or temporary significance, to determining whether a written account, drawings or even a model was required as a permanent record. This detailed investigation was referred to one of the Committees established early on in the formation of the Society. There were six principal ones: Agriculture, Chemistry, Polite Arts, Manufactures, Mechanics, and Colonies and Trade. They dealt with the matters speedily – often within a week – and would meet frequently to get the work done. By 1764 the organisation for handling prize entries and awards had almost become an industry in its own right: the offers published that year filled 91 pages of text and had 380 classes in which to compete. By 1766 the amount expended on premiums totalled £16,625.

A poem by George Cockings was published in 1769 dedicated to "The Right Honourable the President, Vice Presidents and Members of the Society..." which gives a full and amusing account of the Society and its achievements.

In response to concerns over deforestation and possible timber shortages in the eighteenth century, the RSA awarded metals to those who planted the most trees annually. According to RSA historian Anton Howes, "The medal-winners altogether planted at least sixty million trees—a figure that fails to take into account the countless others who entered the annual competition and lost, as well as the broader and intended effect of making tree-planting fashionable".

The RSA also supplied premiums for devising new forms of machinery, including an extendable ladder to aid firefighting that has remained in use relatively unchanged.

The polite arts includes "painting, drawing, sculpture, die-sinking, designs for manufactures, and ... literature". The RSA provided premiums to promote the acquisition of artistic materials, such as dyes and colors, and it offered prizes to young people to foster the development of talent, including Edwin Landseer who at the age of 10 was awarded a silver medal for his drawing of a dog.

The RSA originally specifically precluded premiums for patented solutions. Today the RSA continues to offer premiums.

In 1823, Augustus Siebe won the Vulcan medal from the Royal Society of Arts for an improved screw threading tool.

The RSA awards three medals – the Albert Medal, the Benjamin Franklin Medal, and the Bicentenary Medal. Medal winners have included Nelson Mandela, Sir Frank Whittle, and Professor Stephen Hawking.

Prizes

Recipient	Reason	Prize
Henry Greathead	Invention of the lifeboat	50 guineas and a gold medal
John Bell	Invention of a method of firing a rope and grapple by mortar from a ship to the shore, to save people on board from shipwreck	50 guineas
John Hessey Abraham	Invention of a magnetic apparatus that would prevent metal dust getting into the eyes and lungs of workers employed in grinding the points of needles	A medal
Christopher Pinchbeck	Invention of a safer crane with a pneumatic braking mechanism	?
George Smart	Invention of the Scandiscope	Gold medal

K W Luckhurst, MA – the then secretary to the RSA – described in his 1949 paper the many successes flowing from the awards, including reafforestation and the invention of mechanical devices. Much more recently, however, the economist Zorina Khan has stated that the Society "ultimately became disillusioned with the prize system, which they recognized had done little to promote technological progress and industrialization" and argues that the patent system is more effective.

=== Royal Designers for Industry ===
In 1936, the RSA awarded the first distinctions of Royal Designers for Industry (RDI or HonRDI), reserved for "those very few who in the judgment of their peers have achieved 'sustained excellence in aesthetic and efficient design for industry'".

In 1937, "The Faculty of Royal Designers for Industry" was established as an association with the object of "furthering excellence in design and its application to industrial purposes": membership of the Faculty is automatic for (and exclusive to) all RDIs and HonRDIs. The Faculty currently has 120 Royal Designers (RDI) and 45 Honorary Royal Designers (non-British citizens who are awarded the accolade of HonRDI): the number of designers who may hold the distinction of RDI at any one time is strictly limited.

The Faculty consists of practitioners from fields as disparate as engineering, graphics, interaction, product, furniture, fashion, interiors, landscape, and urban design. Past and present members include Eric Gill, Enid Marx, Sir Frank Whittle, Sir Jonathan Ive, Dame Vivienne Westwood, Sir James Dyson, Sir Tim Berners-Lee, Manolo Blahnik, Naoto Fukasawa, Rei Kawakubo, Issey Miyake, Dieter Rams, Sergio Pininfarina, Alvar Aalto, Vico Magistretti, Walter Gropius, Charles Eames, Richard Buckminster Fuller, Saul Bass, Raymond Loewy, George Nelson, Paul Rand, Carlo Scarpa, Vuokko Nurmesniemi, Massimo Vignelli, Yohji Yamamoto, Peter Zumthor, and more.

== Activities ==
In Great Britain and Ireland, the RSA offers regional activities to encourage Fellows to address local topics of interest and to connect with other Fellows in their locality. The British Regions are: London, Central, North, Scotland, South East, South West, Wales and, Ireland. The RSA has a presence around the world under its RSA Global scheme with a notable presence in Australia, New Zealand and the United States.

=== Events ===
The RSA's public events programme is a key part of its charitable mission to make world-changing ideas and debate freely available to all. Over 100 keynote lectures, panel discussions, debates, and documentary screenings are held each year, many of which are live-streamed over the web. Events are free and open to the public, and mp3 audio files and videos are made available on the RSA's website and YouTube page.

Speakers on the RSA's stage have included Ken Robinson, Al Gore, Sir David Attenborough, Alain de Botton, Michael Sandel, Nassim Nicholas Taleb, Martha Nussbaum, Desmond Tutu, Steven Pinker, Susan Cain, Dan Pink, Dan Ariely, Brene Brown, Slavoj Zizek, David Cameron, Yuval Noah Harari and Dambisa Moyo.

The choice of speaker for the recent annual Presidential lecture has been a matter of interest in the press. Danish professor Björn Lomborg, was chosen; his book, Cool It, suggests that the imminent demise of polar bears is a myth.

On 14 January 2010, the RSA in partnership with Arts Council England hosted a one-day conference in London called "State of the Arts". A number of speakers from various disciplines from art to government gathered to talk about the state of the arts industry in the United Kingdom. Notable speakers included Jeremy Hunt MP, Shadow Secretary of State for Culture, Media and Sport, and his counterpart, Ben Bradshaw MP, who was then the Secretary of State for Culture, Media and Sport.

=== RSA Animate (animation series) ===
Excerpts from the events programme form the basis for the 10-minute whiteboard animations as shown on the theRSAorg YouTube channel. The series was created as a way of making important, socially-beneficial ideas as accessible, clear, engaging and universal as possible. The series is produced and audio-edited at the RSA, and the animations are created by RSA Fellow Andrew Park at Cognitive.

The first 14 of these had gained 46 million views as of 2011, making it the no.1 nonprofit YouTube channel worldwide. The first animation in the RSA Animate series was based on Renata Salecl's speech delivered for RSA on her book about choice. The RSA and Andrew Park have been collaborating since 2008.

=== Projects ===
The society offered the first national public examinations in 1882 that led to the formation of the RSA Examinations Board now included in the Oxford, Cambridge and RSA Examinations Board.

In 1876, a predecessor of the Royal College of Music, the National Training School for Music, was founded by the RSA.

The RSA devised a scheme for commemorating the links between famous people and buildings, by placing plaques on the walls – these continue today as "blue plaques" which have been administered by a range of government bodies. The first of these plaques was, in fact, of red terracotta erected outside a former residence of Lord Byron (since demolished). The society erected 36 plaques until, in 1901, responsibility for them was transferred to the London County Council (which changed the colour of the plaques to the current blue) and, later, the Greater London Council (the G.L.C.) and, most recently, English Heritage. Similar schemes are now operated in all the constituent countries of the United Kingdom.

In 1929, the society purchased the entire village of West Wycombe. After extensive repairs, the village was legally conveyed by deed to the National Trust.

During the 1980s, the RSA worked with the Comino Foundation and established a Comino Fellowship Committee 'to change the cultural attitude to industry from one of lack of interest or dislike to one of concern and esteem'. This eventually led to a joint government/industry initiative to promote 1986 as "Industry Year", with the RSA and the Comino Foundation providing core funding of £250,000 – which persuaded the Confederation of British Industry to raise £1 million and government departments to provide £3 million.

In July 2008, the RSA became a sponsor of an academy in Tipton, The RSA Academy, which opened in September 2008. A New building for the school was completed in September 2010. In 2021 it was announced that the school would no longer be associated with the RSA. Projects include Arts and Ecology, Citizen Power, Connected Communities, Design and Society, Education, Public Services, Social Brain, and Technology in a Cold Climate. There are six schools in the RSA Family of Academies, all in the West Midlands, including Whitley Academy. The former RSA Academy in Tipton was also a member, until its disassociation in 2021.

Past projects include delivering fresh drinking water to the developing world, rethinking intellectual property from first principles to produce a Charter (published as the Adelphi Charter), investigating schemes to manage international migration and exploring the feasibility of a UK-wide personal carbon trading system. It still promotes the practice of inclusive design, and is working with artists to communicate ideas about environmental sustainability (for example, through one of the RSA's past projects, WEEE Man, and currently through the Arts and Ecology project).

The RSA has been home to TEDxLambeth, a TEDx conference based in Lambeth, since October 2019.

Newer projects include the 2025 Southern Creative Catalyst. With the goal of strengthening the influence of creative industries across the Central South of England. Led by RSA fellows working to better support creative businesses and develop and test theories of place-based growth. In order for the economy and network of Central South to interact more effectively. The project is partnering with multiple universities and organizations in the area.

== RSA House ==
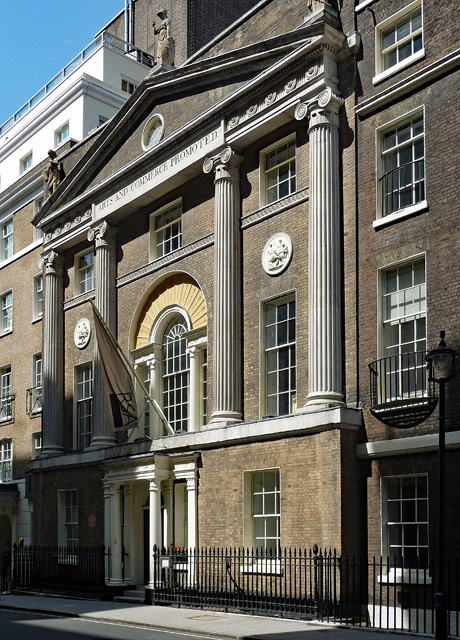
Front façade of the RSA building at 8 John Adam Street in London

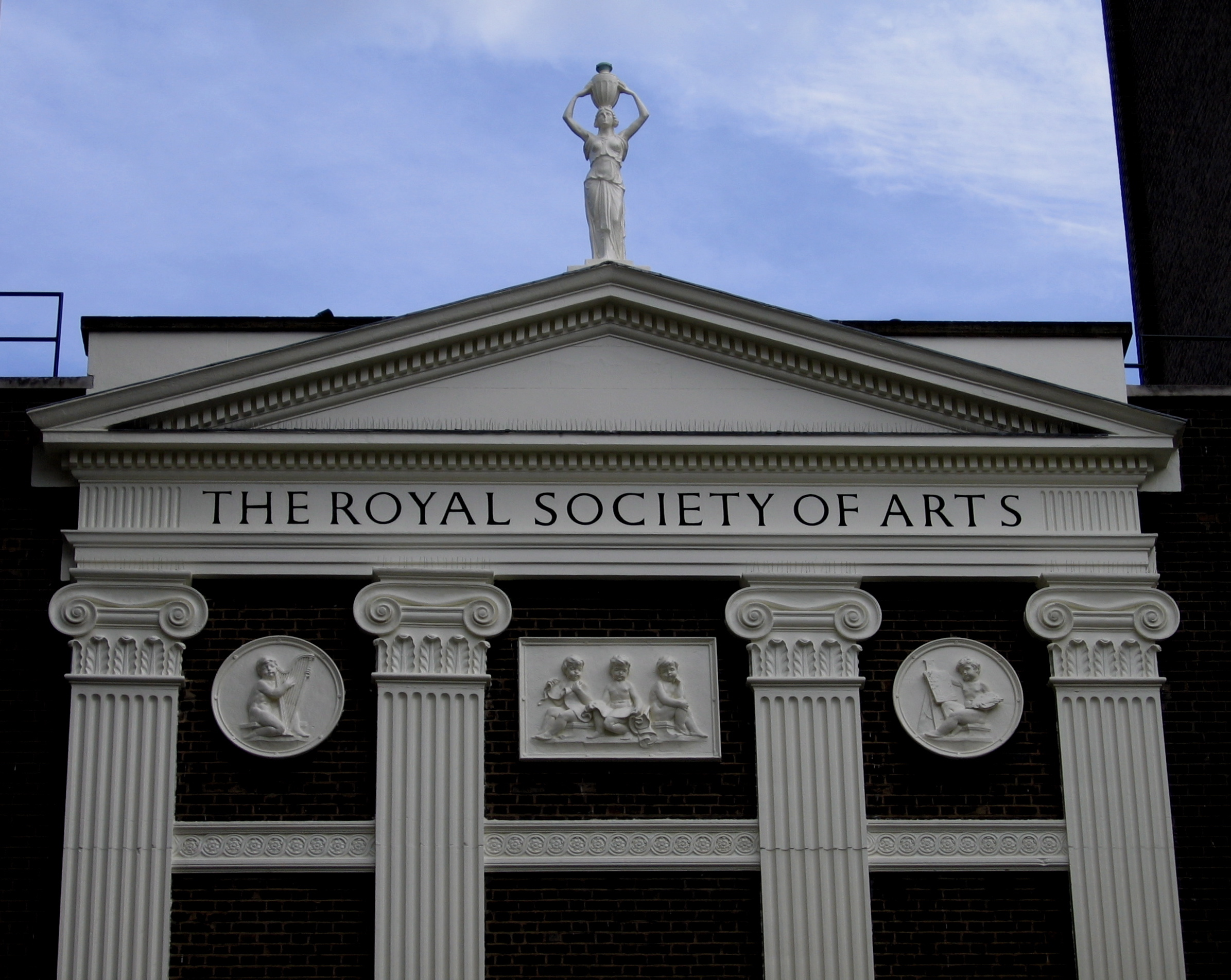
The RSA building, rear façade (facing the Strand)

Audio description of the building by Matthew Taylor

Early meetings took place in "coffee houses or taverns, or wherever else was convenient". As membership increased, there was a stronger need for a dedicated venue. The RSA moved to its current home in 1774. The House, situated in John Adam Street, near the Strand in central London, had been purpose-designed by the Adam Brothers (James Adam and Robert Adam) as part of their innovative Adelphi scheme. The original building (6–8 John Adam Street) includes the Great Room, which features a magnificent sequence of paintings by Irish artist James Barry titled The Progress of Human Knowledge and Culture and portraits of the society's first and second presidents, painted by Thomas Gainsborough and Joshua Reynolds respectively. On the RSA building's rear frieze, the words "The Royal Society of Arts" are displayed (see photograph at right), although its full name is "The Royal Society for the Encouragement of Arts, Manufactures and Commerce".

The RSA has expanded into adjacent buildings, and now includes 2 and 4 John Adam Street and 18 Adam Street. The first occupant of 18 Adam Street was the Adelphi Tavern, which is mentioned in Dickens's The Pickwick Papers. The former private dining room of the Tavern contains a magnificent Adam ceiling with painted roundels by the school of Kauffman and Zucchi.

A major refurbishment in 2012 by Matthew Lloyd Architects won a RIBA London Award in 2013, and a RIBA English Heritage Award for Sustaining the Historic Environment, also in 2013.

== Associated organisations ==
The origin of London's Royal Academy of Arts lies in an attempt in 1755 by members of the RSA (then simply known as the Society for the Encouragement of Arts, Manufactures and Commerce), principally the sculptor Henry Cheere, to found an autonomous academy of arts to teach painting and sculpture. Prior to this a number of artists were members of the RSA, including Cheere and William Hogarth, or were involved in small-scale private art academies, such as the St Martin's Lane Academy. Although Cheere's attempt failed, the eventual charter, called an 'Instrument', used to establish the Royal Academy of Arts over a decade later was almost identical to that drawn up by Cheere and the RSA in 1755. The RSA also hosted the first exhibition of contemporary art in 1760. Thomas Gainsborough and Joshua Reynolds were among those who exhibited at this first exhibition, and were subsequently founder members of the Royal Academy of Arts in 1768.

An 1852 photography exhibition led to the creation of the Photographic Society of London in 1853.

== Arms ==
Coat of arms of Royal Society of Arts
Adopted 2006 Crest Within an Ancient Crown Or a Terrestrial Globe proper on its stand Or. Escutcheon Vert issuing from the base an Arcade thereon the Façade of the House of the Royal Society of Arts Or encircled by five Mural Crowns Argent. Supporters On either side A Pegasus wings inverted Or about the neck a Torse Azure and Gules pendant therefrom by a Chain a Lozenge Sable.

== See also ==
- First Exhibition (1760)
- List of fellows of the Royal Society of Arts
- List of learned societies in the UK
