= John Butts (painter) =

Irish landscape painter (1728–1764)

John Butts (c. 1728 – 1764/5) was an Irish landscape painter, specialising in woodland and river scenes.

== Life ==
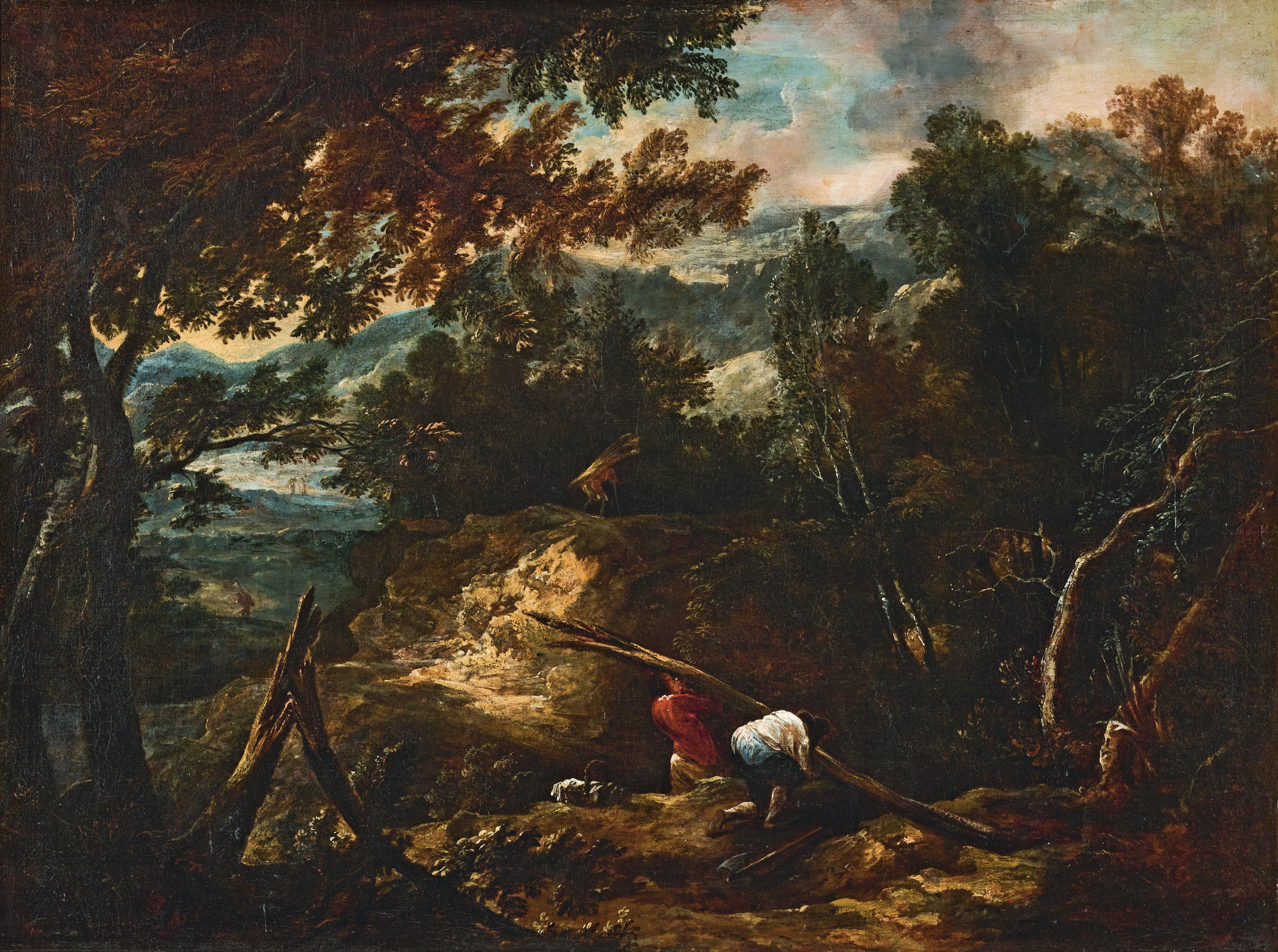
A Mountainous Wooded Landscape With Figures Gathering Wood (oil on canvass)

Butts was born around 1728 and was educated in Cork, Ireland. He received his training from Rogers, one of the earliest recorded Irish landscape painters, and who was described in multiple sources as the "father of landscape painting in Ireland".

He painted landscapes somewhat in the style of Claude Lorrain, and worked as an art teacher, his pupils in Cork including James Barry and Nathaniel Grogan. In around 1757, at the age of about 30, he moved to Dublin, where he continued to work as a landscape and figure painter, and was also employed as a scene-painter at the Crow Street Theatre and Smock Alley Theatre.

He spent much of his life in poverty, and struggled to support his large family. Owing to his alleged alcoholism, Butts painted copies of alehouse scenes which he sold cheaply, along with also doing coach panels and sign painting. It is believed that he also painted forgeries having made the acquaintance of the art dealer, Chapman. Barry, in a letter written soon after Butts' death, described him as "an unfortunate man, who with all his merit never met with any thing but cares and misery, which I may say hunted him into the very grave. His cast of genius was very much that of Claude's, whom he resembles without any imitation more than anybody that I know of".

He died in 1764 or 1765. Butts' works are considered some of the finest Irish landscapes of the period, and are rare. The Tate Gallery holds his A Mountainous Wooded Landscape.

His painting, View of Cork from Audley Place (1750), which was previously attributed to Grogan is now held in the Crawford Gallery, Cork. The National Gallery of Ireland hold a sketch by Butts dated "Feb 24".

== Sources ==
- Strickland, Walter S. (1913). A Dictionary of Irish Artists (National Library of Ireland online ed.).

Attribution:
