= James Barry (painter) =

Irish painter (1741–1806)

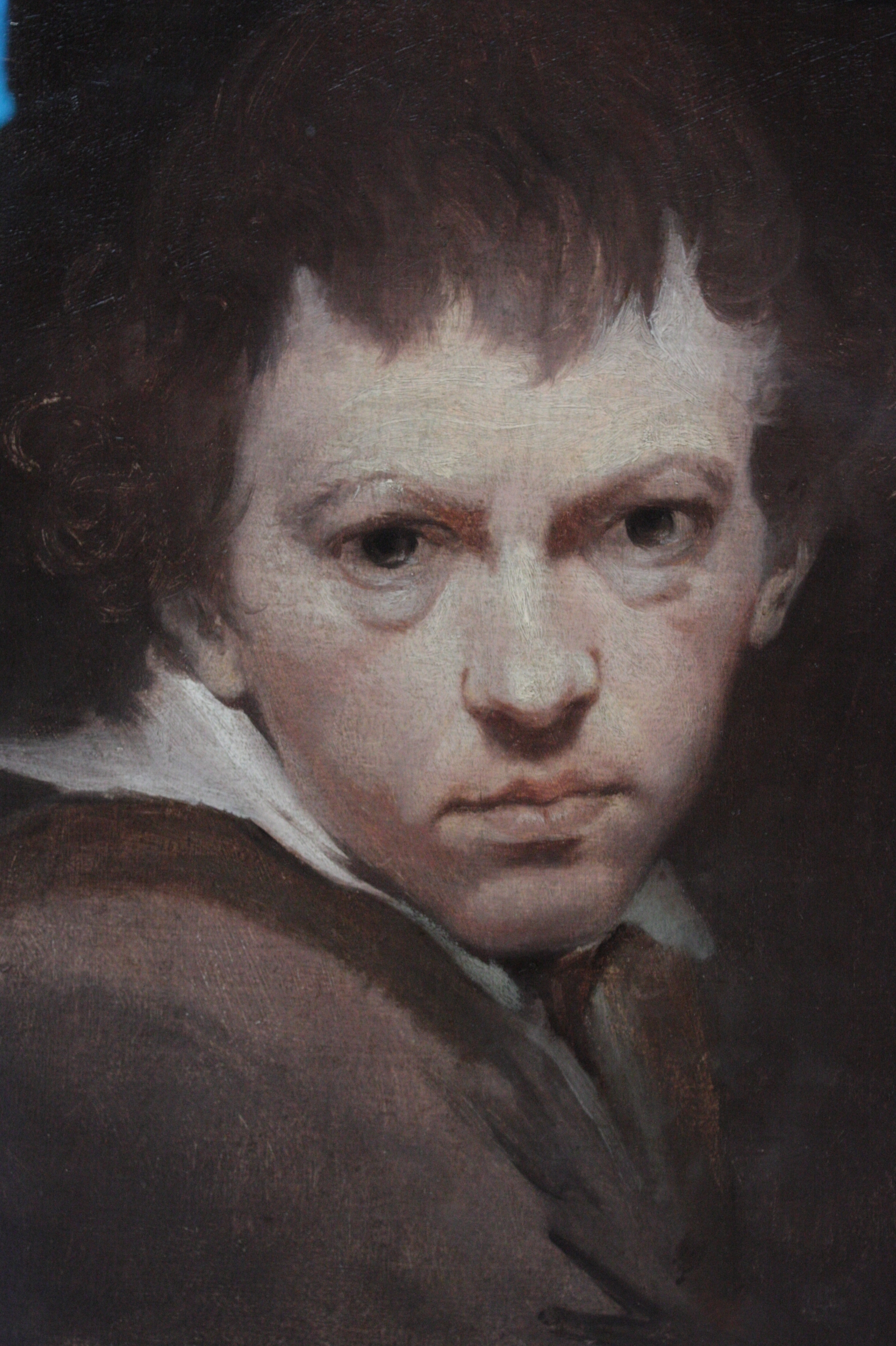
- Barry, Self-portrait, c. 1775
- Born: 11 October 1741; Cork, Ireland
- Died: 22 February 1806 (aged 64); London, England
- Resting place: St Paul's Cathedral, London
- Education: John Butts
- Known for: Painting, drawing, portraits and landscapes and for being a patron of Edmund Burke
- Notable work: The Progress of Human Culture (1783); Baptism of the King of Cashel (1762); Jupiter and Juno on Mount Ida (1773); Ulysses and his companions escaping from Polyphemus (1776); King Lear Weeping over the Dead Body of Cordelia (1788)
- Movement: Neoclassicism, Romanticism
- Family: James Barry (surgeon)

James Barry (11 October 1741 – 22 February 1806) was an Irish painter, best remembered for his six-part series of paintings entitled The Progress of Human Culture in the Great Room of the Royal Society of Arts in London. Because of his determination to create art according to his own principles rather than those of his patrons, he is also noted for being one of the earliest romantic painters working in Britain, though as an artist few rated him highly until the fully comprehensive 1983 exhibition at the Tate Gallery led to a reassessment of this "notoriously belligerent personality", who emerged as one of the most important Irish artists. He was also notable as a profound influence on William Blake.

Barry was elected to the Royal Academy of Arts; and in 1782 he was appointed professor of painting at the Royal Academy schools (1782-99).

== Early life ==
James Barry was born in Water Lane (now Seminary Road) on the north side of Cork, Ireland on 11 October 1741. His father had been a builder, and, at one time of his life, a coasting trader between England and Ireland. Barry actually made several voyages as a boy but convinced his father to let him study drawing and art. He first studied painting under local artist John Butts.

At the schools in Cork to which he was sent he was regarded as a prodigy. At about the age of seventeen, he first attempted oil painting, and between that and the age of twenty-two, when he first went to Dublin, he produced several large pictures, which decorated his father's house, such as Aeneas escaping with his Family from the Flames of Troy, Susanna and the Elders and Daniel in the Lions' Den".

== Career ==
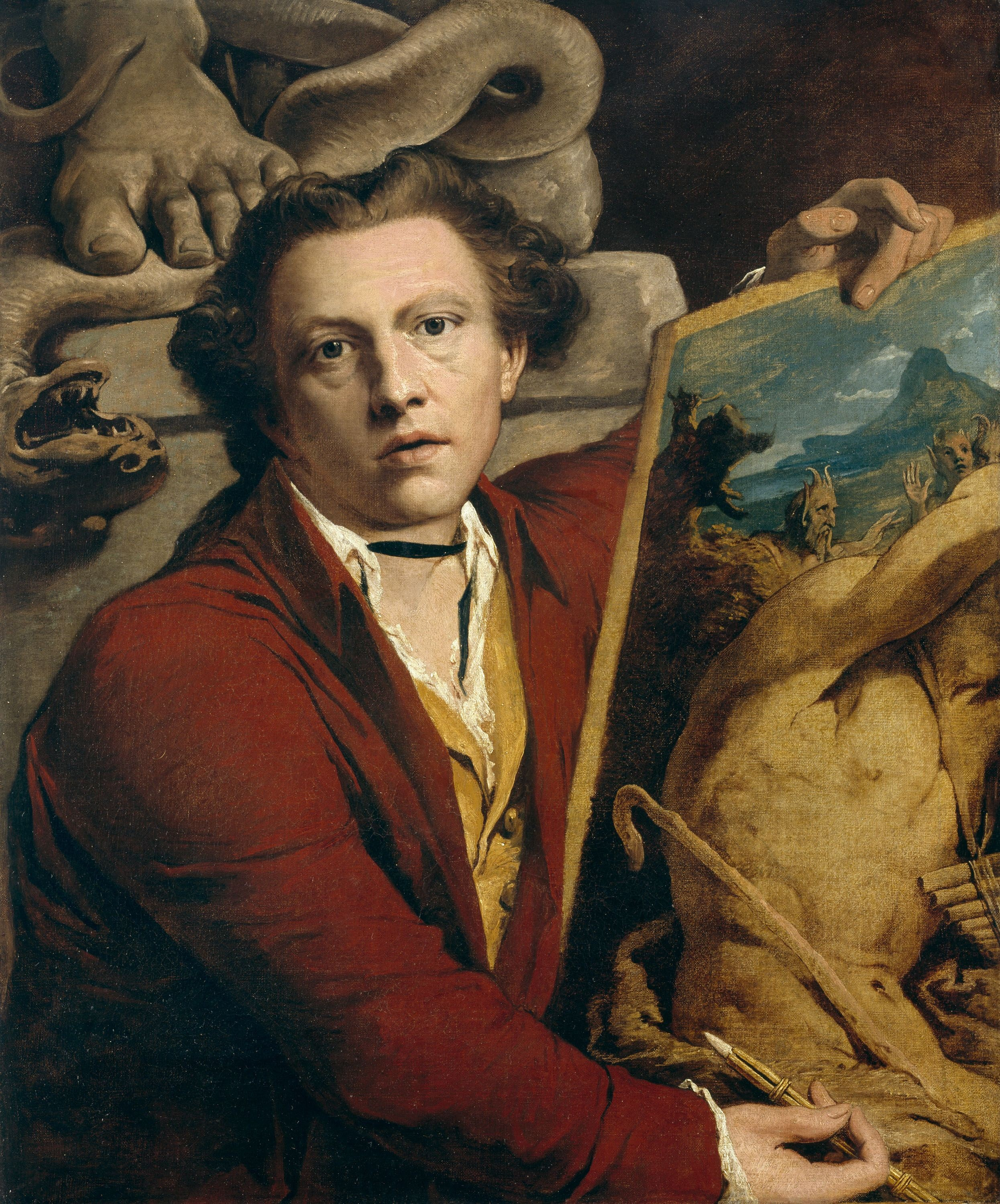
Barry, Self-portrait, 1803, oil on canvas. National Gallery of Ireland, Dublin.

The painting that first brought him into public notice, and gained him the acquaintance and patronage of Edmund Burke, was the Baptism of the King of Cashel, exhibited at the Royal Dublin Society in 1763. This work was purchased by a group of members of the Parliament of Ireland to be hung in the Commons Chamber of the Parliament House, Dublin. The painting was believed lost (even by Barry himself) in the fire which occurred there on 27 February 1792, but is almost certainly the painting rediscovered by William L. Pressly at Terenure College in 1976, in unexhibitable condition.

By the liberality of Burke and his other friends, Barry in the latter part of 1765 was enabled to go abroad. He went first to Paris, then to Rome, where he remained upwards of three years, from Rome to Florence and Bologna, and thence home through Venice. While in Italy, he became friendly with the Scottish painter Alexander Runciman and the Swedish sculptor Tobias Sergel. His letters to the Burkes, giving an account of Raphael, Michelangelo, Titian and Leonardo da Vinci, show remarkable insight. Barry painted two pictures while abroad, an Adam and Eve and a Philoctetes. Barry had also mastered the art of aquatint.

Soon after his return to England in 1771, he produced his picture of Venus, which was compared to the Galatea of Raphael, the Venus of Titian and the Venus de Medici. In 1773 he submitted his Jupiter and Juno on Mount Ida at the Royal Academy Exhibition of 1773. His Death of General Wolfe, in which the British and French soldiers are represented in very primitive costumes, was considered a falling-off from his great style of art. His fondness for Greek costume was assigned by his admirers as the cause of his reluctance to paint portraits. His failure to go on with a portrait of Burke which he had begun caused a misunderstanding with his early patron. The difference between them is said to have been widened by Burke's growing intimacy with Sir Joshua Reynolds, and by Barry's jealousy of the fame and fortune of his rival "in a humbler walk of the art". About the same time he painted a pair of classical subjects, Mercury inventing the lyre, and Narcissus, the last suggested to him by Burke. He also painted a historical picture of Chiron and Achilles, and another of the story of Stratonice, for which last the duke of Richmond gave him a hundred guineas.

In 1773, it was proposed to decorate the interior of St. Paul's with historical and sacred subjects; but the plan fell to the ground, from not meeting with the agreement of the bishop of London and the Archbishop of Canterbury. Barry was upset by the failure, for he had in anticipation fixed the subject he intended to paint – the rejection of Christ by the Jews when Pilate proposes his release. In 1773, he published An Inquiry into the real and imaginary Obstructions to the Acquisition of the Arts in England, vindicating the capacity of the English for the fine arts and tracing their slow progress to the Reformation, to political and civil dissensions, and lastly to the general direction of the public mind to mechanics, manufactures and commerce.

In 1774, a proposal was made through Valentine Green to Sir Joshua Reynolds, Benjamin West, Cipriani, Barry, and other artists to ornament the Great Room of the 'Society for the encouragement of Arts, Manufactures and Commerce' (now the Royal Society of Arts), in London's Adelphi, with historical and allegorical paintings. This proposal was at the time rejected by the artists; but in 1777, Barry made an offer to paint the whole on condition that he was allowed the choice of his subjects, and that he would be paid by the society the costs of canvas, paints and models. His offer was accepted. He finished the series of pictures after seven years to the satisfaction of the members of the society, who granted him two exhibitions, and at subsequent periods voted him 50 guineas, a gold medal, and a further 200 guineas. Barry regularly returned to the series for more than a decade, making changes and inserting new features. The series of six paintings—The Progress of Human Culture—has been described by critic Andrew Graham-Dixon as "Britain's late, great answer to the Sistine Chapel".

Soon after his return from the continent, Barry was chosen as a member of the Royal Academy of Arts; and in 1782 he was appointed professor of painting (1782-99). Working in the room of Edward Penny his salary was £30 a year. During his time at the Royal Academy of Arts, Barry painted The Thames (or Triumph of Navigation) in 1791, which featured the English music historian Charles Burney. Among other things, he insisted on the necessity of purchasing a collection of pictures by the best masters as models for the students and proposed several of those in the Orleans collection. This recommendation was not relished, and in 1799 Barry was expelled from the academy soon after the appearance of his Letter to the Dilettanti Society, an eccentric publication, full of enthusiasm for his art and at the same time of contempt for the living professors of it. Barry remained the only academician ever to be expelled by the academy until Brendan Neiland in July 2004.

== Final days and death ==
After the loss of his salary, a subscription was set on foot by the Earl of Buchan to relieve him from his difficulties, and to settle him in a larger house to finish his picture of Pandora. The subscription amounted to £1000, with which an annuity was bought, but on 6 February 1806 he was seized with illness and died on the 22nd of the same month. On 4 March his remains were interred in St Paul's Cathedral, London.

== Legacy ==
The 1911 Encyclopædia Britannica has this to say:

As an artist, Barry was more distinguished for the strength of his conceptions, and for his resolute and persistent determination to apply himself only to great subjects, than for his skill in designing or for beauty in his colouring. His drawing is not especially good, his colouring ordinary. He was impulsive; sometimes morose, sometimes sociable and urbane; jealous of his contemporaries, and yet capable of pronouncing a splendid eulogy on Reynolds.

== Selected works ==
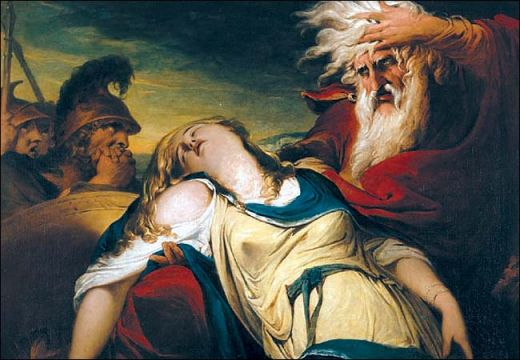
King Lear mourns Cordelia's death, 1786–88

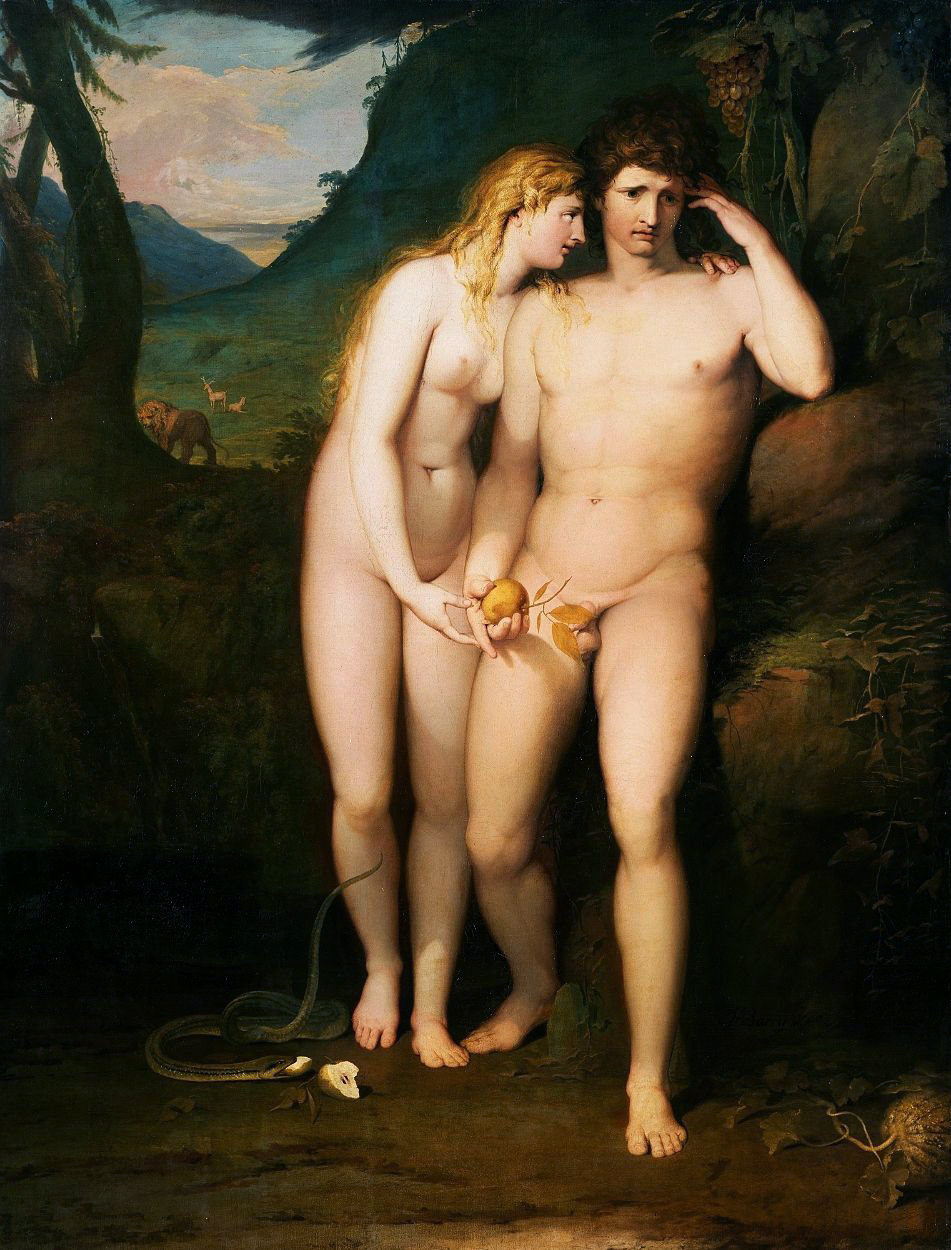
The Temptation of Adam, 1767–70

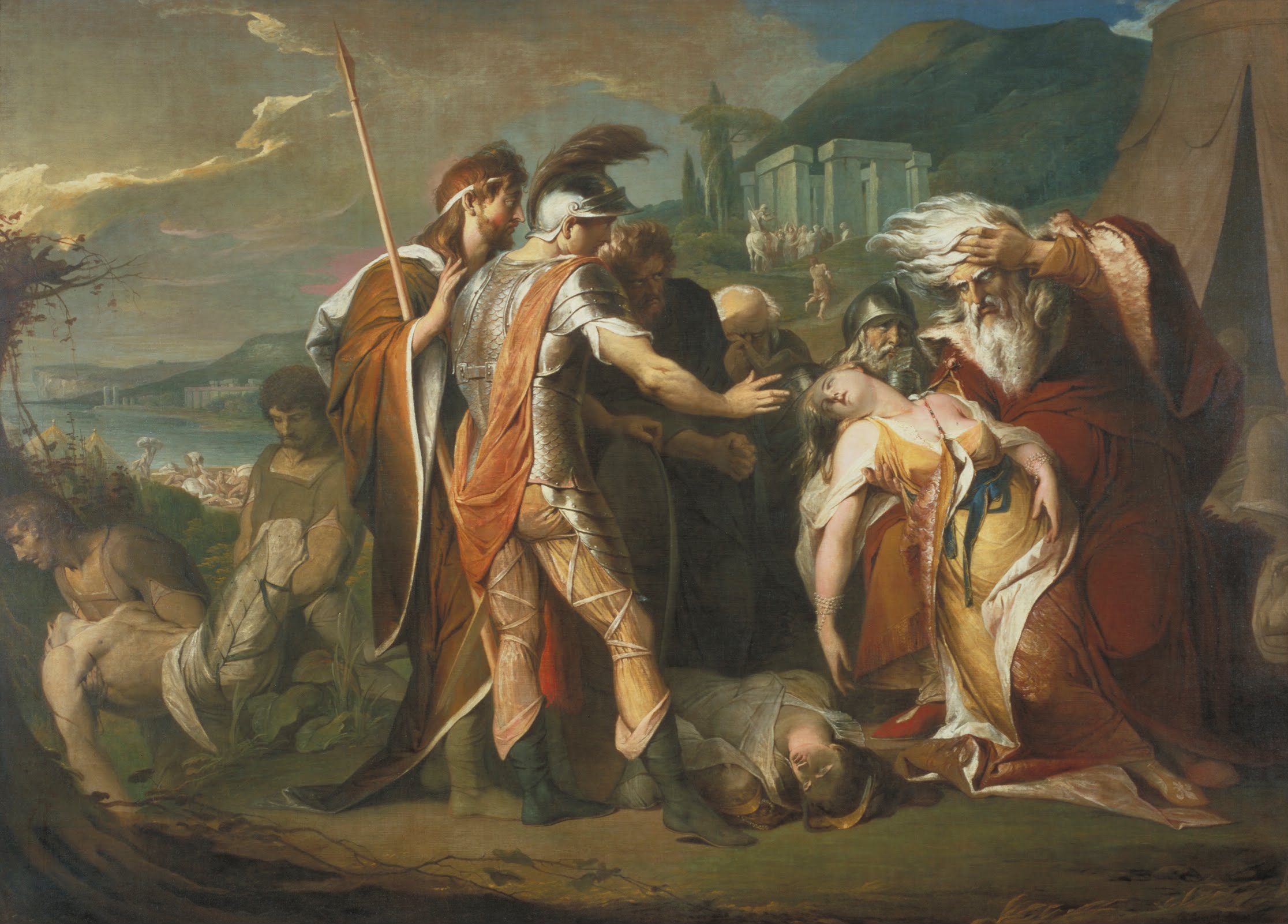
King Lear Weeping over the Dead Body of Cordelia, 1788

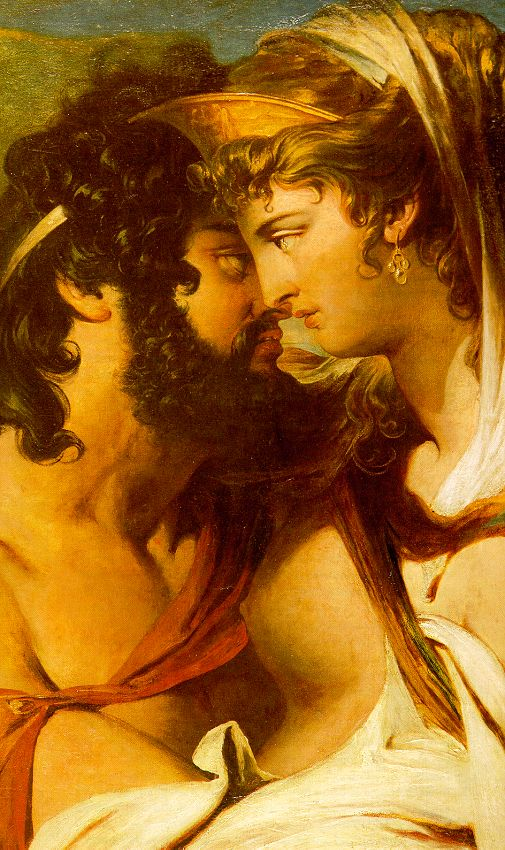
Jupiter and Juno on Mount Ida, City Art Galleries, Sheffield

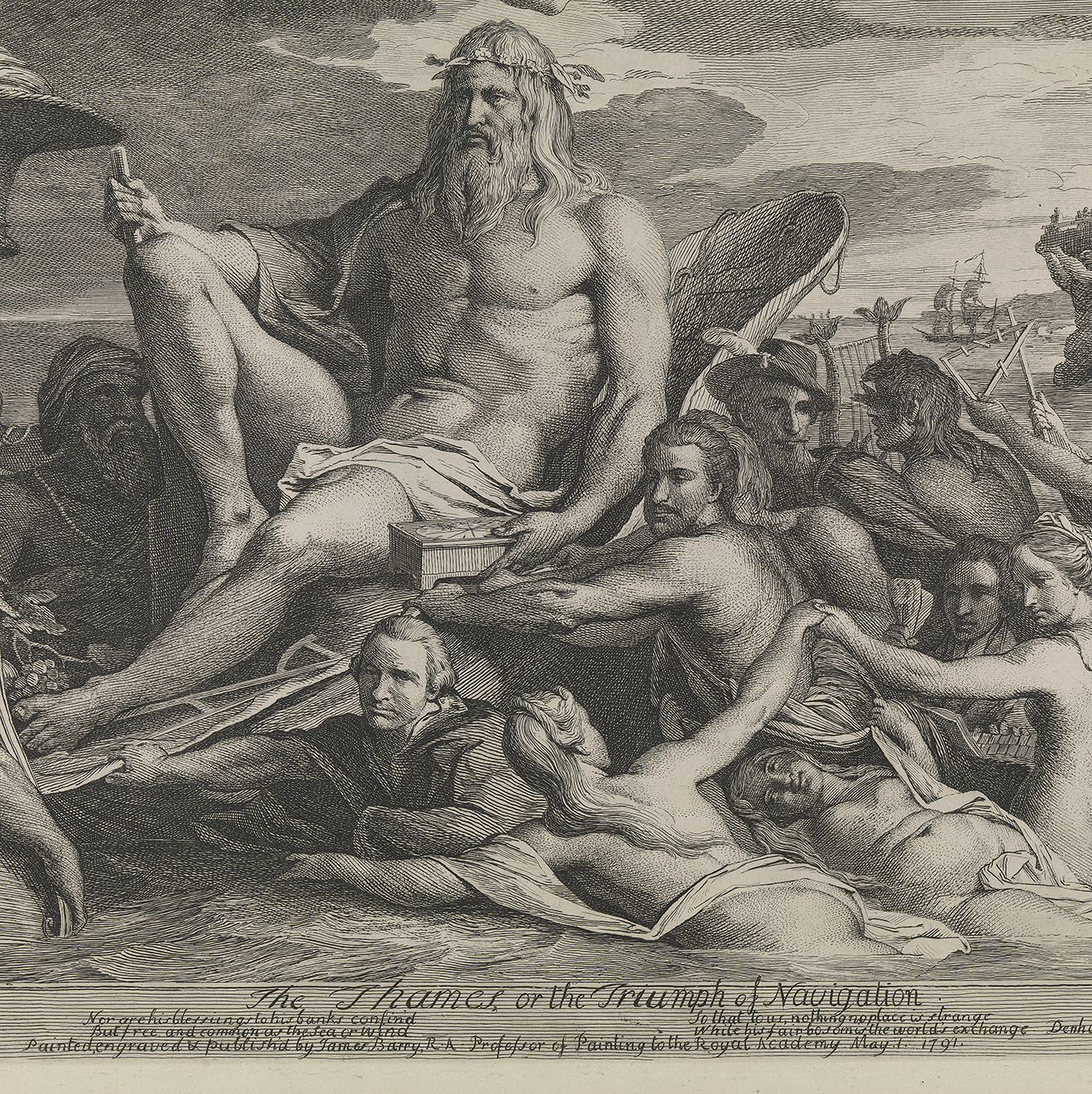
The Thames or Triumph of Navigation

== See also ==
- Art of the United Kingdom
- English school of painting
- Irish art
- List of people on the postage stamps of Ireland

== Sources ==
- Chisholm, Hugh, ed. (1911). "Barry, James" . Encyclopædia Britannica (11th ed.). Cambridge University Press.
- Pressly, William L. (1983). James Barry: The Artist as Hero. London: The Tate Gallery. ISBN 0-905005-09-0 (Catalogue of the 1983 exhibition)
- Pressly, William, L. (1985). "Portrait of a Cork Family: The Two James Barrys" (PDF). Cork Historical and Archaeological Society. 90: 127–149.
