= The Progress of Human Culture =

Six paintings by James Barry, 1777–1784

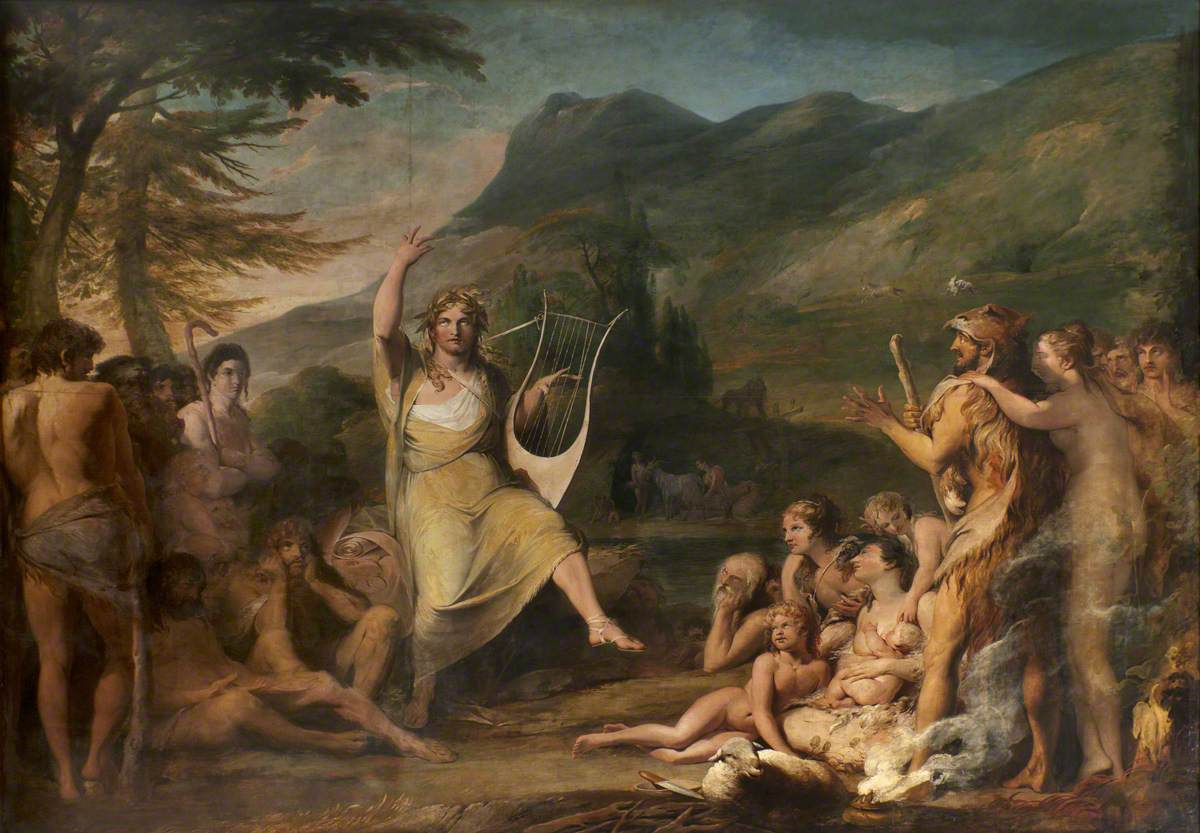
Painting 1: Orpheus

The Progress of Human Culture is a series of six paintings by Irish artist James Barry. Depicting the advance of Western culture from prehistory to the 18th century, the paintings adorn the walls of the Great Room of the Royal Society of Arts in London.

== Background ==
In 1774, the Royal Society of Arts approached several artists, including Barry, to decorate the Great Room of their new headquarters in the Adelphi; all except Barry declined, and in 1777 Barry offered to undertake the task on his own. The Society offered to compensate him for materials and models, and would pay him the proceeds resulting from two exhibitions of the series, once completed. The work took seven years to complete, and by the time the paintings were presentable enough to exhibit, in 1783, Barry was living in poverty. He earned little money from the two exhibitions, though critics were enthusiastic in their praise of his work. This financial failure was a blow to the painter's morale and productivity. In later years, during his tenure as professor of painting at the Royal Academy of Arts, Barry made frequent alterations to the series.

William Blake expressed indignation at the Royal Society of Arts' treatment of Barry, whom he admired: [all punctuation and capitalization is Blake's]

Who will Dare to Say that Polite Art is Encouraged, or Either Wished or Tolerated in a Nation where The Society for the Encouragement of Art Suffrd Barry to Give them his Labour for Nothing? A Society Composed of the Flower of the English Nobility & Gentry – A Society Suffering an Artist to Starve while he Supported Really what They under pretence of Encouraging were Endeavouring to Depress. – Barry told me that while he Did that Work – he lived on Bread & Apples.

— William Blake

Barry was committed to a vision of the artist as prophet, and conceived of his own medium and subject matter as the pinnacle of art. In his own words, "History painting and sculpture should be the main views of everyone desirous of gaining honor by the arts. These are tests by which the national character will be tried in after ages, and by which it has been, and is now, tried by the natives of other countries." The primary task of the artist, as Barry saw it, was instructive; according to his biographer William Pressly, The Progress of Human Culture "illustrates how both societies and individuals have achieved greatness in the past and how contemporary England can best realize a more glorious future." It is also important to note that Barry was an Irish Catholic: this marginalized position, as well as his aesthetic belief in the primacy of the symbolic over the allegorical, contributed to the esotericism of the paintings, which include hidden Catholic imagery and narratives.

The exhibition was accompanied by Barry's An Account of a Series of Pictures, in the Great Room of the Society of Arts, Manufactures, and Commerce, a book which Horace Walpole writes "does not want sense, though [it is] full of passion and self, and vulgarisms, and vanity." In his introduction to the book, Barry describes his purpose in the series as being "to illustrate one great maxim of moral truth, viz. that the obtaining of happiness, as well individual as public, depends on cultivating the human faculties."

== The six paintings ==
The first painting, Orpheus, seeks to represent the mythical musician not in the quaint way that had become a commonplace of Western art, but "as he really was, the founder of Greek theology, uniting in the same character, the legislator, and the poet, as well as the musician." Here Orpheus, messenger of the gods, instructs the Greeks through music. Their condition exposes Barry's view of the state of nature as a miserable and savage condition. In the background of the painting, Ceres is coming to the earth for the first time. In front of Orpheus, to illustrate his lessons, are items such as papers, an egg, and a bound lamb. Orpheus' pose in this painting is based on traditional representations of John the Baptist.

In the second painting, A Grecian Harvest Home, or Thanksgiving to the Rural Deities, a group of young people dance around a garlanded double statue of Silvanus and Pan. Other harvest festival activities are depicted behind them, along with instruments of the harvest such as a threshing floor and ox-drawn cart. In the top left, deities such as Ceres, Pan, and Bacchus gaze benevolently down on the celebration. Barry writes: "I have endeavoured to introduce whatever could best point out a state of happiness, simplicity, and fecundity, in which, though not attended with much eclat, yet, perhaps, the duty we owe to our God, to our neighbor, and ourselves, is much better attended to in this, than in any other stage of our progress...". The wrestlers and other athletes in the middle distance show the conflict undergirding human progress, a subject which will be picked back up in the third painting. The Christianizing narrative continues here: a mother and children, based on iconography of Mary with the infant Christ and John the Baptist, is present under a peacock representing immortality

This third painting, Crowning the Victors at Olympia, is a crowded composition that depicts a moment at the Olympic Games when the victors would process before the judges, who would crown them with wreaths of olive. Near the throne of the judges, a scribe records the names of the victors. There appears a runner, a pankratist, and a victor at the cestus, as well as Hiero II of Syracuse in his chariot; Pindar leads the chorus. Carried on the shoulders of the boxer is an aging former athlete, who has imparted his knowledge to a new generation. Statesman such as Pericles and Cimon appear as spectators, along with figures such as Socrates, Anaxagoras, Euripides and Herodotus. It should be mentioned that Barry associated the judges of the ancient Olympics with the papacy, and that there is a Catholic undertone to this painting: the focus shifts through the first three paintings from John the Baptist to Christ to the papacy, depicting this succession as an inevitable fact of human progress.

Barry begins his exegesis of the fourth painting, Commerce, or the Triumph of the Thames, by noting that "The practice of personifying rivers, and representing them by a genius, or intelligence, adapted to their particular circumstances, is as ancient as the arts of poetry, painting and sculpture." Here, he depicts "Father Thames" holding a compass, carried along the river by Britain's great navigators, depicted as Tritons. Nereids, depicted in attitudes ranging from playful to lascivious, conclude the train, showing the frivolity of many commercial matters; above Father Thames is Mercury, personifying Commerce.

The fifth painting, The Distribution of Premiums in the Society of Arts, dramatizes the act of patronage. Barry depicts many contemporary artists and intellectuals, including Samuel Johnson and Barry's own friend and patron Edmund Burke. Barry takes the opportunity in his book to praise those who have helped him in his career, and to expound his own ideal system of patronage.

The sixth painting, Elysium, or the State of Final Retribution, Barry brings together "those great and good men of all ages and nations, who were cultivators and benefactors of mankind." On a pedestal at the left is a pelican, which according to legend rips her own breast open to feed her young, here used as a metaphor for artistic labors but elsewhere frequently found in Catholic contexts.

== Gallery ==
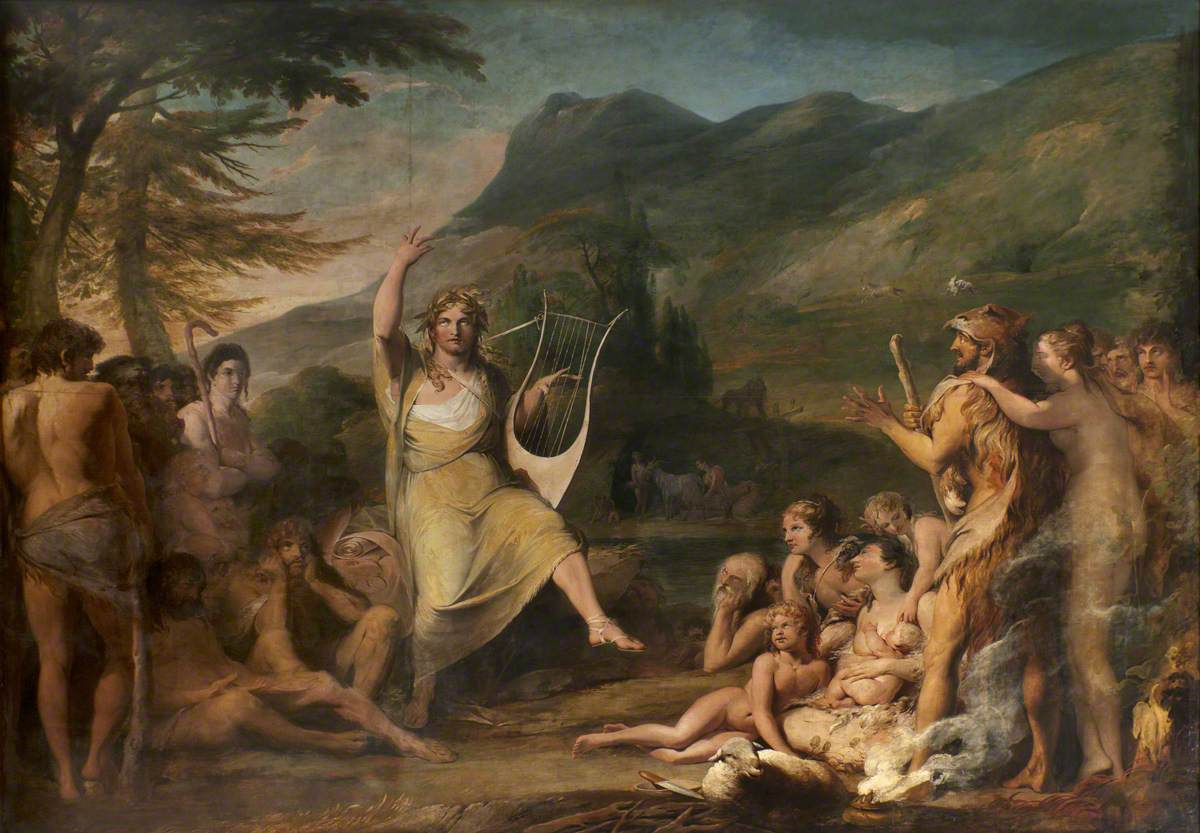
Painting 1: Orpheus

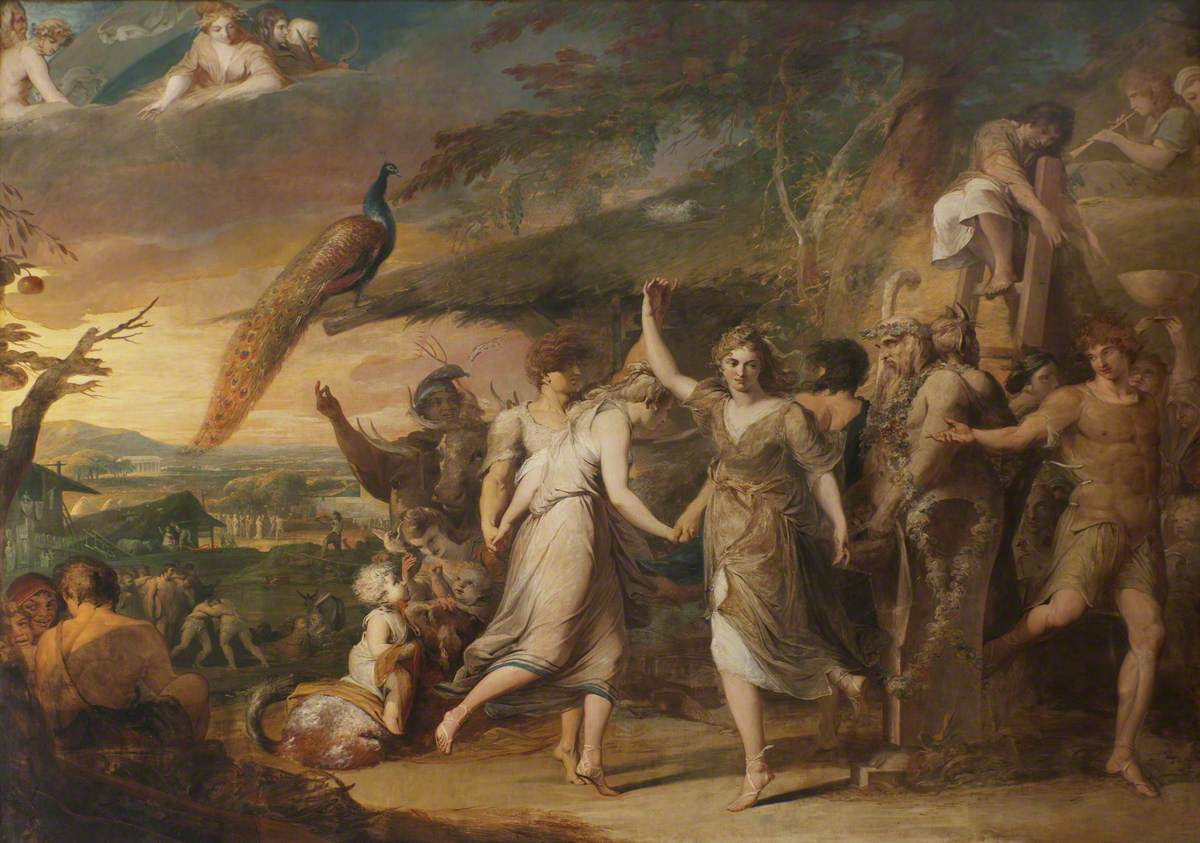
Painting 2: A Grecian Harvest Home, or Thanksgiving to the Rural Deities, Ceres, Bacchus

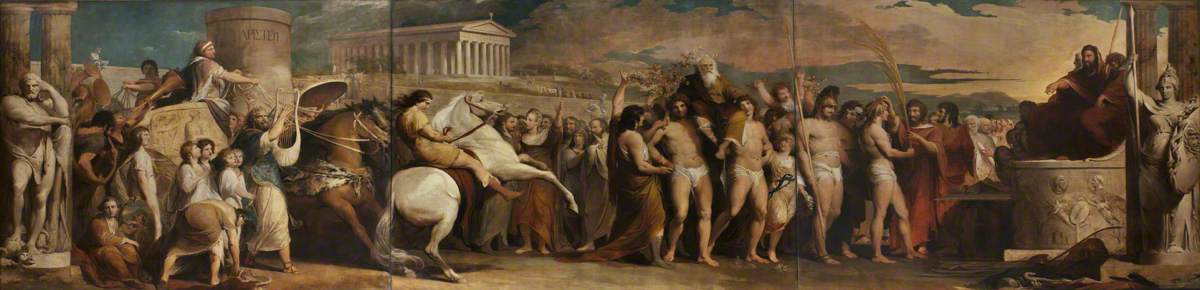
Painting 3: Crowning the Victors at Olympia

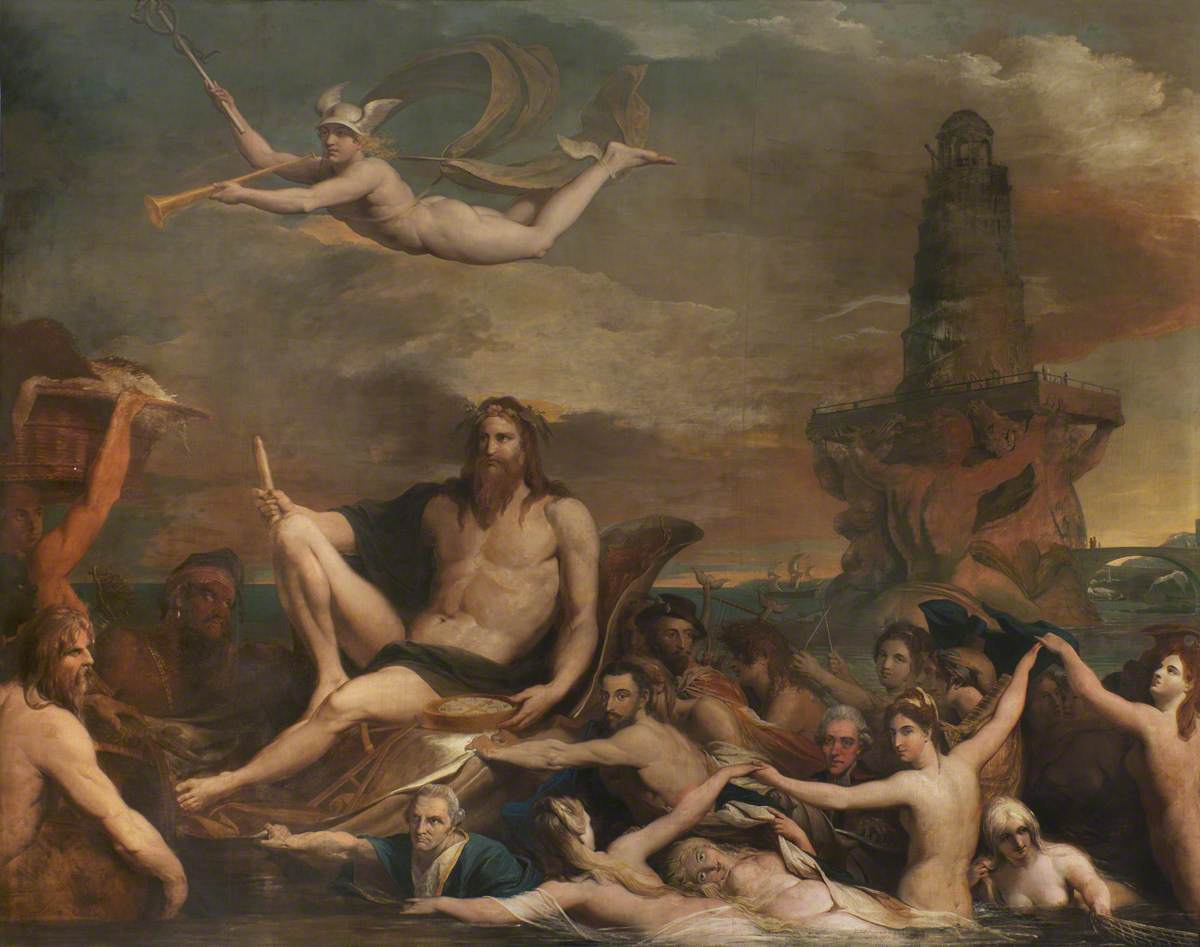
Painting 4: Commerce, or the Triumph of the Thames

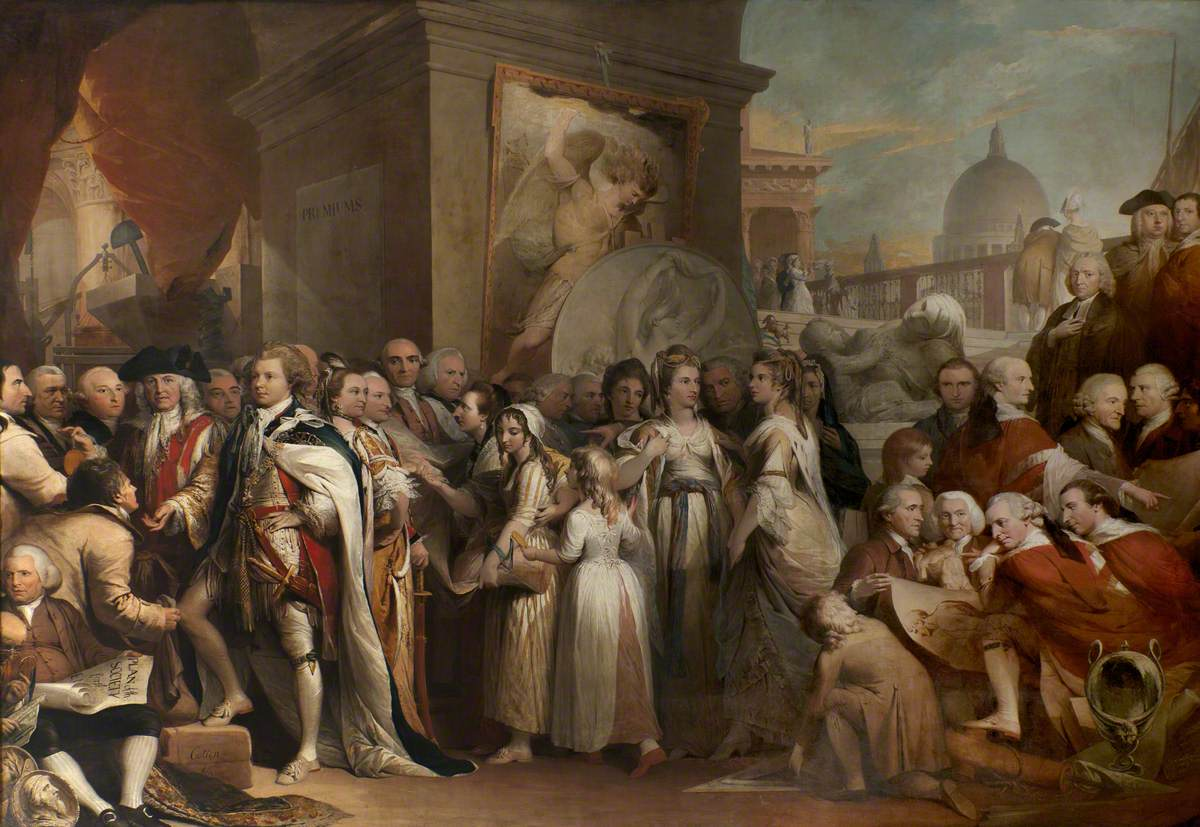
Painting 5: The Distribution of Premiums in the Society of Arts

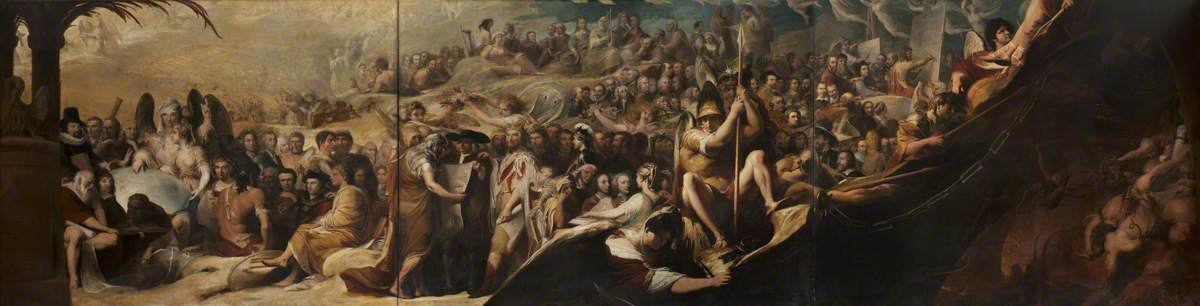
Painting 6: Elysium, or the State of Final Retribution
