= King Lear Weeping over the Dead Body of Cordelia =

Painting by James Barry

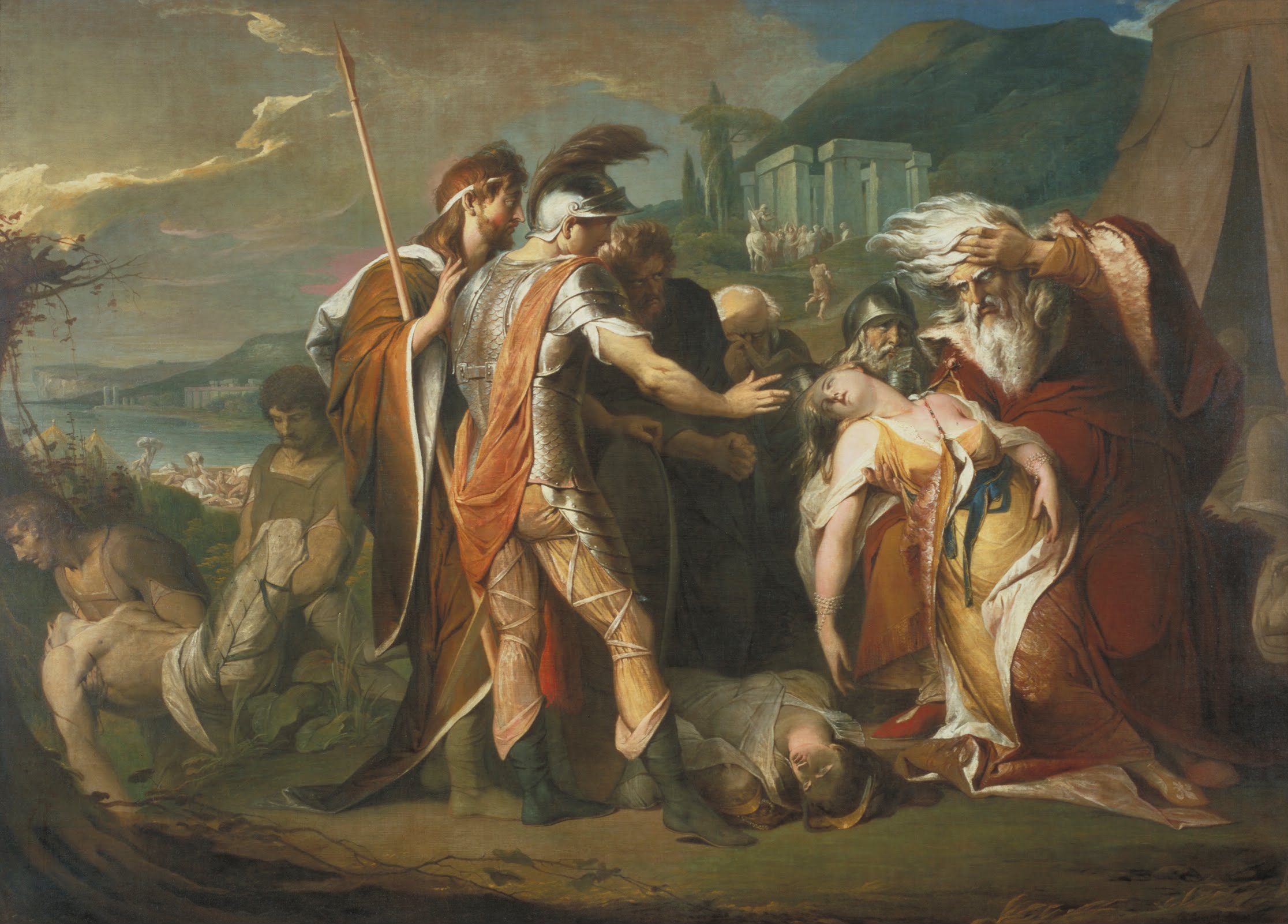
- Artist: James Barry
- Year: 1788
- Type: Oil on canvas, landscape painting
- Dimensions: 269.2 cm × 3671 cm (106.0 in × 1,445 in)
- Location: Tate Britain, London

King Lear Weeping over the Dead Body of Cordelia is a c.1788 oil painting by the Irish artist James Barry. It depicts a scene from William Shakespeare's tragedy King Lear. A grief-stricken Lear is shown supporting the body of his dead daughter Cordelia. To emphaise the Ancient British theme, Stonehenge is shown in the background.

The picture was commissioned by John Boydell for the new Boydell Shakespeare Gallery in Pall Mall. Barry was a prominent member of the Royal Academy of Arts known for his neoclassical paintings. In 1792 the printmaker Francis Legat produced an engraving

The painting is now in the collection of the Tate Britain in Pimlico, which purchased it in 1962.

== Bibliography ==
- Facos, Michelle. An Introduction to Nineteenth-Century Art. Taylor & Francis, 2011
- Martineau, Jane. Shakespeare in Art. Merrell, 2003.
- Smith, Anthony D. The Nation Made Real: Art and National Identity in Western Europe, 1600–1850. OUP Oxford, 2013.
