= Brendan Neiland =

English artist (born 1941)

Brendan Neiland (born 23 October 1941) is an English artist best known for his paintings of reflections in modern city buildings. In 1992 he was elected to the Royal Academy (RA).

Neiland is known for his interpretations of city life. His use of light and pictorial structure, using a spray-gun technique developed at the Royal College of Art, has seen Neiland likened to Georges Braque and Johannes Vermeer. His work is widely exhibited in major museums and galleries worldwide including, in Britain, the Victoria and Albert Museum, The Tate Gallery London, The Collections of the British Council and the Arts Council of Great Britain. He is represented by the Redfern Gallery and has had numerous shows internationally, including at the Galerie Belvedere in Singapore, who represent him in Singapore and the Far East.

In 1998 Neiland was appointed Keeper (Director) of the Royal Academy School's, and was credited with reviving what had been a struggling art school. In July 2004 he resigned as Keeper following newspaper reports concerning financial irregularities. Neiland was subsequently expelled from the membership following a vote by Royal Academicians. Neiland is the first artist to be stripped of his membership since James Barry in 1799.

It was reported that Neiland had been contributing his own consultancy earnings and funds he had raised independently towards the operation of the Royal Academy Schools. In doing so Neiland had not observed the budgetary discipline and financial controls required by the organisation. Neiland later said he had set aside the missing money, the fruit of his own fundraising efforts, to protect it from being sucked into a general RA fund. However other commentators speculated that his expulsion was connected to an internal power struggle over the governance of the RA.

Fellow Academician Sir Peter Blake resigned from the academy in protest at Neiland's expulsion.
