= Whiteboard animation =

Animation on a whiteboard

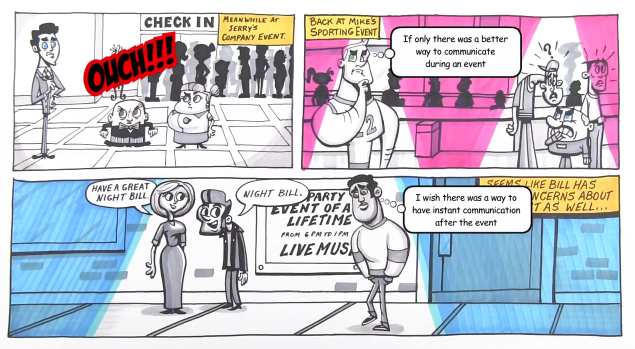
Whiteboard animation video example

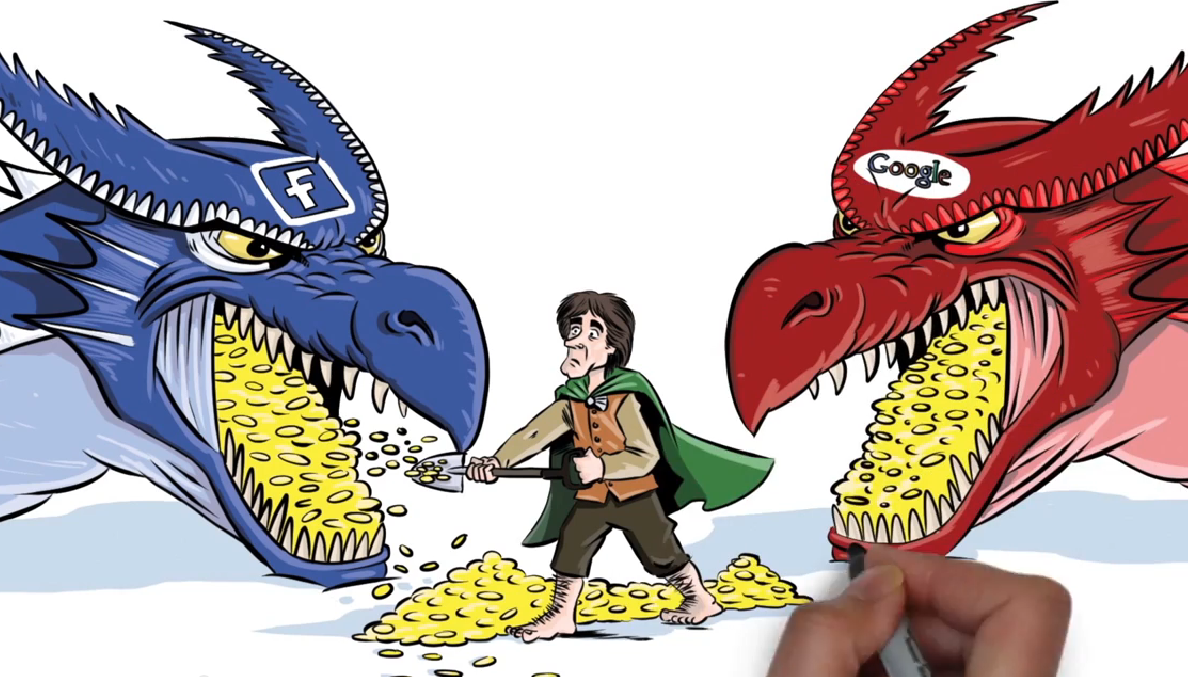
Whiteboard-Animation-Example

Whiteboard animation is the process in which an author physically draws and records an illustrated story using a whiteboard, or whiteboard-like surface, and marker pens. The animations frequently are aided with narration by script. The authors commonly use time-lapsed drawing and stop motion animation to liven hand-drawn illustrations, with YouTube used as a common platform. It is also used in television and internet advertisements to communicate with consumers in a personal way. The earliest videos made using Whiteboard Animation were published in 2009 on YouTube, used mostly for experimental purposes until developing into a storytelling device, focusing mostly on narratives and educational explanations.

== Description ==
"Whiteboard animation" refers to a specific type of presentation that uses the process of creating a series of drawn pictures on a whiteboard that are recorded in sequence and then played back to create an animated presentation. The actual effect of whiteboard animation is time-lapse, or stop-motion. The actual sequential frame by frame animation is rarely used but has been incorporated. Other terms are "video scribing" and "animated doodling". These video animation styles are now seen in many variations and have taken a turn into many other animation styles. With the introduction of software to create whiteboard animations, the process has many different manifestations of varying quality. Those who use whiteboard animation are typically businesses and educators.

== Process ==
The whiteboard animation production procedure begins with creating a topic. Once the topic is chosen, scriptwriting begins. After the content is created, it is time to create rough drafts of animations. These assist to set up the inventive bearing and timing for the movement. The rest of the process is as follows:

1. Compose the content
2. Record the voiceover
3. Make starting animations
4. Organize the animations
5. Make Guides
6. Record the video
7. Match up sound and video
8. Include music
9. Export and share

The steps listed above are not set in stone, they should be used as a guideline to create a whiteboard animation production.

== Applications ==
Whiteboard animation has been used in a few TV spots and on internet video sites such as YouTube and Vimeo. Early types were UPS Whiteboard Commercials. Many companies and firms of all sectors and sizes are incorporating this style into their modus operandi to teach company employees different company policies or demonstrate a new software or product to consumers.

For educational purposes, whiteboard animation videos have been used for learning online to teach languages, as chapter summaries for educational textbooks, and for the public communication of academic scholarship. A 2016 study of whiteboard animation found that, despite claims and high popularity, there is little to no compelling experimental evidence that they are more effective in learning, motivation, or persuasion than other forms of learning.

Starting in 2010, the Royal Society of Arts converted selected speeches and books from its public events program into whiteboard animations. Made by whiteboard animation studio Cognitive, the first 14 RSA Animate videos gained 46 million views in 2011, making the RSA's YouTube channel the no.1 nonprofit channel worldwide.

== See also ==
- VideoScribe
