= David Joseph (businessman) =

British businessman

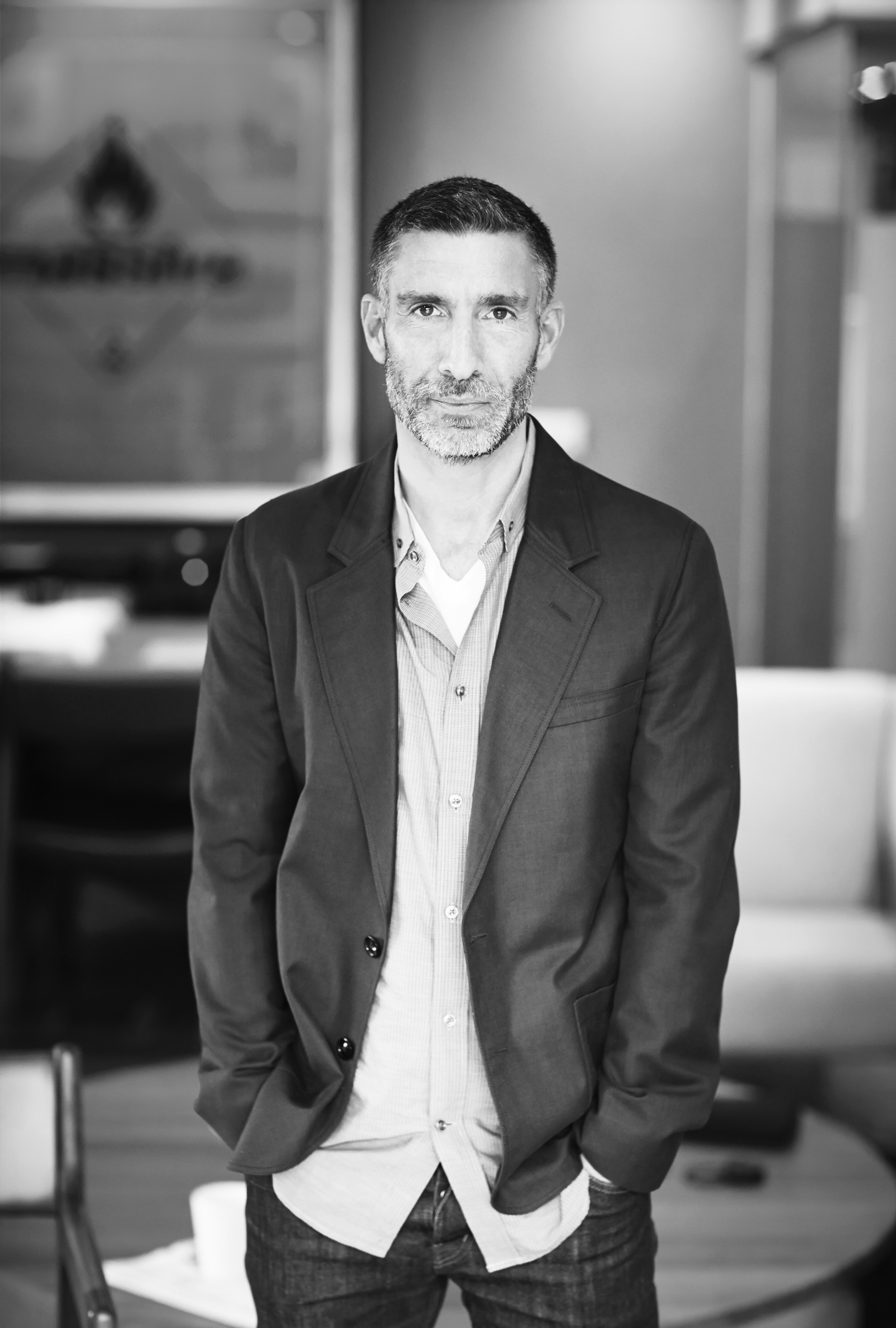
David Joseph

David Joseph CBE is Chair of the Grenfell Foundation and Chief Executive of the Royal Society of Arts (RSA). He was Chairman and CEO of Universal Music UK from 2008 to 2024 and has been involved in the UK music industry for over 20 years. He was a member of Arts Council England's National Council from 2013-2021.

== Biography ==
=== Early career ===
David Joseph began his career at RCA Records where he was head of artist development, working with artists including Take That, Kylie Minogue and Annie Lennox.

=== Universal Music ===
Joseph joined Universal Music in August 1998 as general manager of the company's Polydor label. In February 2002, Joseph became managing director and later co-president of Polydor. In March 2008, he assumed the role of chairman and CEO of Universal Music UK, overseeing the labels 0207 Def Jam, Island, Polydor, Capitol, Decca and EMI, as well as recording studios Abbey Road. Joseph remained in post until 2024.

During his tenure, Universal Music UK represented artists from across the musical spectrum including The Rolling Stones, Elton John, U2, Florence + The Machine, Mumford & Sons, Take That, The 1975, Sam Smith, Stormzy, Sam Fender, Dave, Lewis Capaldi, Michael Kiwanuka. It also released the music of artists such as Drake, Ariana Grande, Justin Bieber, Billie Eilish, Taylor Swift, Eminem, Kendrick Lamar, Lady Gaga, Selena Gomez, and Rihanna. Its catalogue includes the music of Abba, The Beatles and Queen.

=== BRIT Awards and Unity ===
In 2005, Joseph became a member of the BPI Council. From 2010 to 2013 he chaired the Brits Committee, which oversees the Brit Awards. Under his leadership, the BRITs was moved to the O2 arena. 2012's show attracted its biggest television audience since 2005.

In 2020, Joseph oversaw another overhaul of the BRIT Awards, which included performances from the likes of Dave, Stormzy and Celeste. As reported in Billboard, the show was met with “widespread praise from the UK music industry, with many observers hailing at it as the best BRITs in years”.

In 2013 Joseph worked with Doreen Lawrence, Baroness Lawrence of Clarendon to gather music industry support for Unity, the O2 concert marking the 20th anniversary of Stephen Lawrence's murder.

=== Film and Media ===
In 2015, Joseph became the executive producer of Amy, the documentary film about the late singer Amy Winehouse, directed by Asif Kapadia. Amy became the highest-grossing British documentary of all time, taking £3 million at the box office in its first weekend, and won Best Documentary at the 69th British Academy Film Awards, Best Music Film at the 58th Grammy Awards and the Academy Award for Best Documentary Feature at the 88th Academy Awards.

Since Amy, Joseph has been the executive producer on several other projects including the Apple TV+ series 1971: The Year That Music Changed Everything (2021), the documentary One to One: John and Yoko (2024) that chronicles the first 18 months of John Lennon and Yoko Ono's life in New York, and Metallica Saved My Life (2025), a documentary on the band told through the perspective of their fans.

=== Charitable and Public Roles ===
In September 2013, Joseph was appointed as a member of the council of Arts Council England where he served two terms. In 2017, Joseph became a trustee and Vice Chair of the Grenfell Foundation, an organisation which supports survivors, bereaved families and the community to remember the event of 14 June 2017 and to keep the memory of their loved ones in hearts and minds. Joseph was appointed Chair of the organisation in December 2024.

Joseph was appointed Commander of the Order of the British Empire (CBE) in the 2016 New Year Honours for services to the music industry.

In May 2026, Joseph joined the board of Andrew Lloyd Webber's LW Entertainment as non-executive director.

=== Advocacy and initiatives ===
In 2019, Joseph gave an interview in The Evening Standard on the importance of embracing neurodiversity in the workplace. The following year he launched Universal Music’s Creative Differences project, led by the publication of the first handbook for embracing neurodiversity in the creative industries, which was widely covered across BBC networks. He discussed the issue again in 2023 on BBC Radio 4’s Today programme.

In 2021, Joseph became an ambassador for the Autism Centre of Excellence (ACE) at Cambridge University. He also supported initiatives on the role of music in health and wellbeing, speaking at the launch of the Power Of Music report in 2022 and its follow up event in 2023

=== The Royal Society of Arts ===
In September 2024, Joseph announced that he would be stepping down as Chairman & CEO of Universal Music UK after 26 years at the company. He subsequently began a Master's in Religion & Theology at King's College London.

In June 2025, The Royal Society of Arts announced that he had been appointed as the new chief executive of the RSA. He took up the post in September 2025.
