= William Gerard Barry =

Irish painter

- Born: 1864; Ballyadam, Carrigtwohill, County Cork, Ireland
- Died: 9 September 1941 (aged 76–77); Saint-Jean-de-Luz, France
- Occupations: portrait and landscape painter

William Gerard Barry (1864 in Ballyadam, Carrigtwohill – 9 September 1941) was an Irish painter.

== Life and family ==
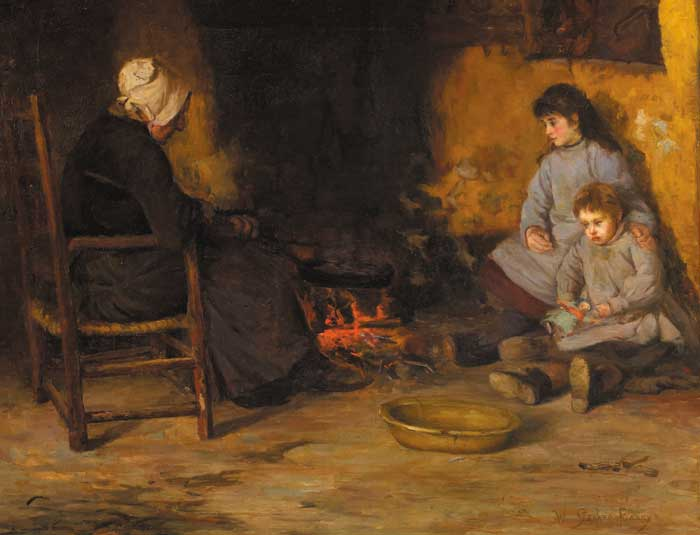
An old woman and children in a cottage interior (1887)

The son of a magistrate, Patrick Barry, William Gerard Barry was born in Ballyadam, Carrigtwohill, County Cork. He was one of 7 children. His mother was Pauline Roche. He moved to Paris, where he was awarded the Humanité medal in 1886 when he jumped into the Seine to rescue a man and boy who were drowning. He returned to Ireland from Paris in 1887, when he became estranged from his father, possibly over money. After this, Barry rarely returned to Ireland. He emigrated to Montreal, Canada, working as a deckhand to fund his ticket and later moved to the United States.

== Career ==
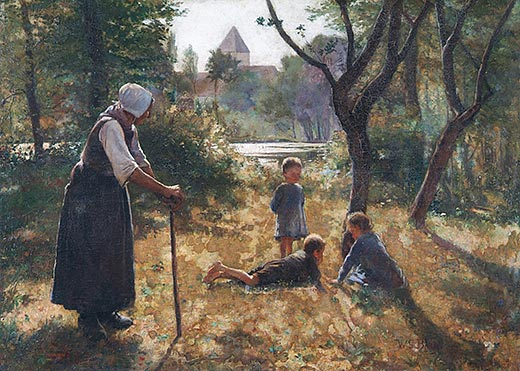
Time Flies (1887)

Barry showed a talent for drawing at a young age. He enrolled in Cork's Crawford School of Art and studied there under Henry Jones Thaddeus from 1881 to 1883. Thaddeus advised Barry to travel to Paris where he continued his training at Académie Julian under Le Febre, Boulanger and Carolus Duran.

New England Hostess (no date)

His initial success came in 1887 when he received a £30 Taylor prize after sending a painting to the Royal Dublin Society from Étaples with his painting called "Abandoned". When he first arrived in Canada, he worked as a sign-painter and horse-breaker on a ranch before moving to the United States. In 1888, he was living in Chicago. By 1913, he was well established as a portrait painter, and in 1926 his address was listed as New York. It is claimed that he was commissioned to paint a portrait of President Woodrow Wilson, that then hung in the White House. He travelled around the South Sea Islands with writer Frederick O'Brien.

Barry was living in Saint-Jean-de-Luz, in southwest France during the German occupation of World War II. There he worked drawing charcoal portraits from his small studio, and later he received an annuity. During the occupation, Barry considered returning to Ireland, but was concerned that his "family would shut him up and this way he would lose control of his money, his greatest love in life". He died at his home there during a bombing raid on 9 September 1941.

According to the Crawford Art Gallery, very little of Barry's work survives, though the Smithsonian American Art Museum hold an example of his work. In 2007, there were only ten known works by Barry.
