= Historic Cork Gardens =

Historic Cork Gardens of County Cork, Ireland.

== Annes Grove Gardens ==
Started by Richard Grove Annesley, in the grounds of a house near Fermoy dating from the early eighteenth century. Home to many Himalayan rhododendrons, some from seeds collected by Captain Frank Kingdon-Ward in Burma and Tibet in 1924. The garden, on the River Blackwater has a water garden to which William Robinson devoted a chapter in his book The English Flower Garden.

== Ardnagashel House ==
On the shores of Bantry Bay, home of the Hutchins family and of the botanist Ellen Hutchins, who, guided by the director of Kew Gardens made an arboretum. This included plantings of Podocarpus salignus. Himalayan trees and shrubs were also subsequently added by a later proprietor, Colonel Kaulback, who had accompanied Frank Kingdon-Ward on one of his Himalayan plant expeditions in the 1920s. Samuel Hutchins (1834–1915) returned from Australia in 1858 with one hundred packets of seeds of Australian plants. Earlier plantings were made by Arthur Hutchins (1770–1838), his brother Emmanuel (1785–1815) and Ellen (1785–1815; a botanical illustrator). The area's history was recorded in 1980 by John Bevan: 'Ardnagashel-A Hidden Treasure'.

== Ashbourne House ==
R.H. Beamish laid out his alpine and subtropical gardens at Glounthaune in 1900. Included were plants from China introduced by E.H. Wilson and from New Zealand by Captain Dorrien Smith of Tresco Abbey in the Scilly Isles. Notable species include Haplocartha scaposa introduced from South Africa by Beamish, together with the rare Mexican White Pine (Pinus ayacahuite), the tallest in Ireland and Britain.

== Ballintober ==
Near Kinsale is a lost demesne, which was noted in the late 17th century for its "elaborate gardens".

== Bantry House ==
The first phase of the garden lay-out at Bantry House was carried out by Lord Bantry between 1791 and 1795. The work was continued by his eldest son Richard (Viscount Berehaven) between 1844 and 1868, and influenced by his continental travels. Restoration was later carried out on the gardens.

== Belgrove ==
Belgrove Gardens on Great Island near Cobh was established by William Edward Gumbleton (1840–1911). He obtained species and varieties from the heads of botanical institutions all over the world. The garden was a cross between trial grounds and a botanical garden. Fruit trials featured in the garden. The writer and garden designer William Robinson in 1899 dedicated a volume of The Garden to Gumbleton. Gumbleton had an extensive botanical library, and on his death he bequeathed its contents to the Irish National Botanic Gardens in Dublin. The garden no longer survives.

== Besborough ==
Besborough House was the home of Ebenezer Pike, located in Blackrock outside Cork. Noted for its collection of 'Desfontainea spinosa', the house and its grounds were acquired by a religious order of nuns.

== Castlemartyr ==
In the early 19th century, Richard Boyle, 4th Earl of Shannon laid out a garden of camellias and a pinetum based on a design by Fraser.

== Cork Botanic Gardens ==
The Royal Cork Institution was set up in 1803 and received a parliamentary grant of two thousand pounds per year. The governors decided to establish a botanical garden, and in 1807 leased a 5.5-acre (22,000 m^{2}) site at 'Lilliput', Ballyphehane. In 1808, they employed Scotsman James Drummond (1787–1863) to lay out the gardens. In 1822, the garden was described (in Power's 1845 Botanist's guide to the County of Cork) as having approximately six acres and a glasshouse in a walled enclosure of 1-acre (4,000 m^{2}). Drummond was a field botanist who spent time in Cork and later in Western Australia. The government grant was withdrawn in 1830, and the governors declined Drummond's offer to lease the gardens and opted to surrender the lease. The lands were then let to the temperance campaigner Father Theobald Mathew for use as a cemetery; which use still continues. The only remaining evidence of the gardens is a cedar tree.

== Creagh ==
Established by the Harold-Barry family on the shores of Baltimore Bay, near Skibbereen. This garden contains a mixture of native and exotic planting, including 'The Ho Che Min Trail'. Formerly open to the public as part of the West Cork Garden Trail, it no longer so following a change of ownership.

== Drombrow House ==
Two miles from Bantry in the Mealagh Valley. The property was owned by the White family from the 1790s until 1853 when Major Arthur Wilkinson bought it. After 1880 Drombow Lake was selected for a reservoir; this gave the impetus to Arthur Berkeley Wilkinson to build a series of water gardens, dedicated to the cultivation of water lilies. The gardens also contained a range of wayside flowers supplied from Glasnevin, and in turn Drombrow supplied Glasnevin with bamboo, waterlily, phlox, and butterwort. After Wilkinson's death, the estate was neglected and the water garden fell into disrepair.

== Fota Island ==
Home to the Smith-Barry family, Fota is located eight miles (13 km) from Cobh on Cork Harbour. Hugh Smith-Barry (1816–57) reclaimed tidal margins from the sea and planted shelter-belts of fir, establishing a 4-acre (16,000 m^{2}) fruit garden and 15-acre (61,000 m^{2}) arboretum. His son Lord Barrymore with his gardener William Osborne continued with the planting of exotics including Nordmann Fir (Abies nordmanniana) from the Caucasus in 1838. The tradition of planting continued under the ownership of University College Cork. The house, arboretum and gardens are now managed by a trust, the remainder of the island being divided between a wildlife park and a golf course.

== Garnish Island ==
Designed by Harold Peto for the owner Annan Bryce in 1910, this island garden, occasionally known as Ilnacullin (or sometimes as Garinish Island) or The Italian Gardens, was bequeathed to the Irish people in 1953. With a favourable micro-climate, Garnish is home to an array of sub-tropical plants in a magnificent setting. Structures include a clock tower, Grecian Temple, Martello Tower, Italian Tea House or "Casita" and an Italian Temple. Access is by small boat from Glengarriff.

== Hollybrook House ==
Skibbereen, on the banks of the Ilen river. Japanese water garden laid out 1903 by two Japanese gardeners for Mrs. Morgan O'Donovan. Hollybrook House is the seat of the O'Donovan family.

== Lakelands ==
Home of William Horatio Crawford (1812–1888), Ballinure, outside Cork on the Mahon peninsula. Magnolia campbelli reputedly flowered for the first time in cultivation here. The house no longer exists, and the dual carriageway road leading to the Jack Lynch Tunnel runs over the spot where the house stood. That is under the bridge.

== Lisselane ==
Home of the Bence-Jones family, outside Clonakilty. Laid out in Robinsonian style with a collection of rare and exotic plants and containing a bog-garden, rock garden, and a fuchsia garden.

== Myrtle Grove ==
Myrtle Grove was the home of Sir Walter Raleigh, Mayor of Youghal (1588–9), reputedly where the potato was introduced to Europe.

== The College, Youghal ==
Laid out by the Earl of Cork c1612-14, these gardens are located besides the Raleigh house at Myrtle Grove and consist of two terraces 160 yards (150 m) long cut into the hillside overlooking the town. The original garden walls and terracing are still present.

== See also ==
- William Baylor Hartland
