= Gumbleton =

Gumbleton is a surname. Notable people with this surname include:

- Frank Gumbleton (born 1951), Australian rules footballer
- John Gumbleton (born 1967), American vice admiral
- Scott Gumbleton (born 1988), Australian rules footballer
- Thomas Gumbleton (1930–2024), American Roman Catholic bishop
- William Edward Gumbleton (1840–1911), Irish horticulturalist
