= Crawford Art Gallery =

- Áiléar Crawford
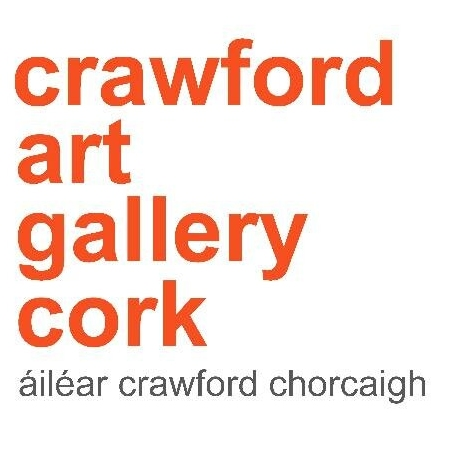

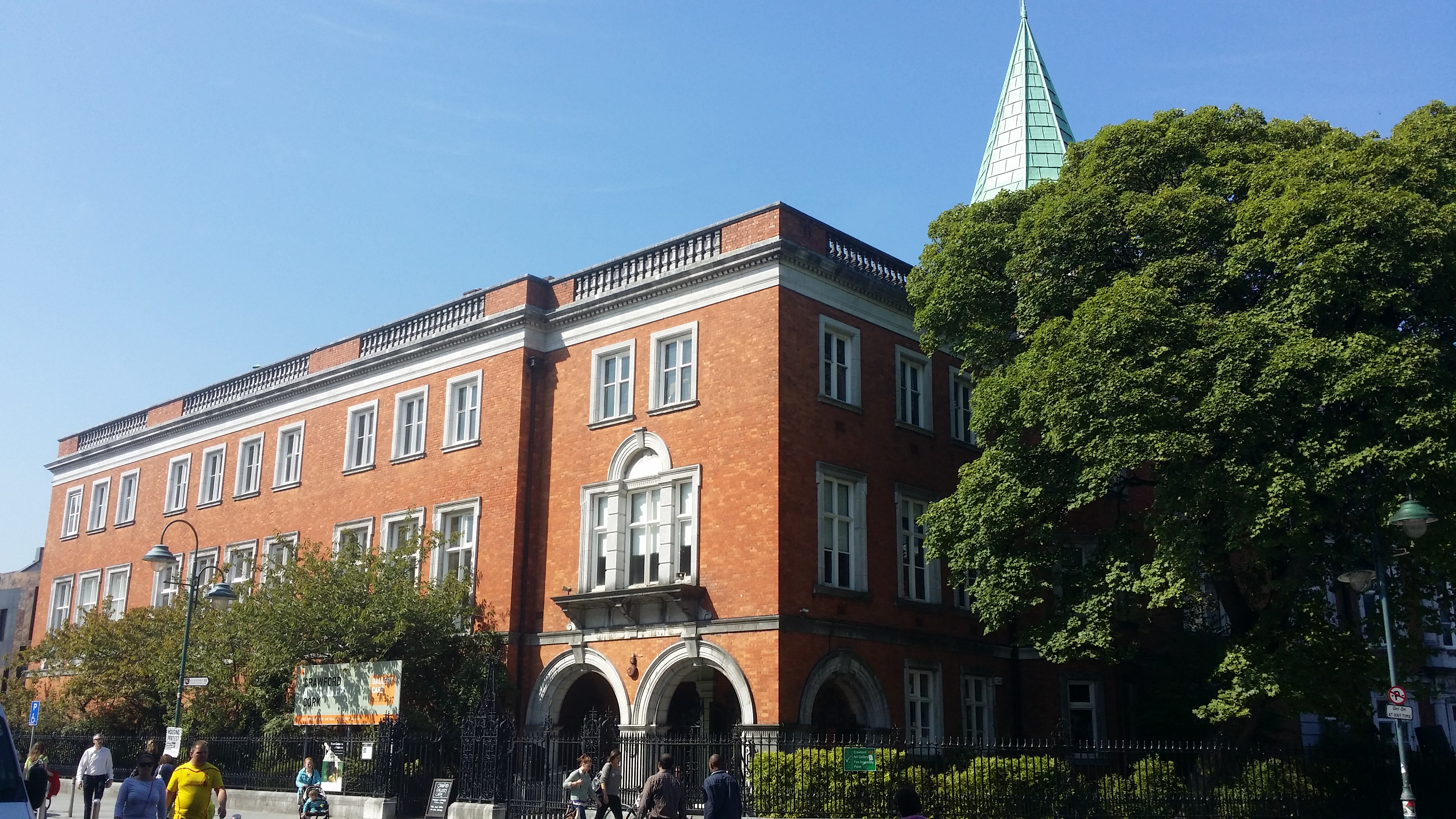
- Main entrance on Emmet Place

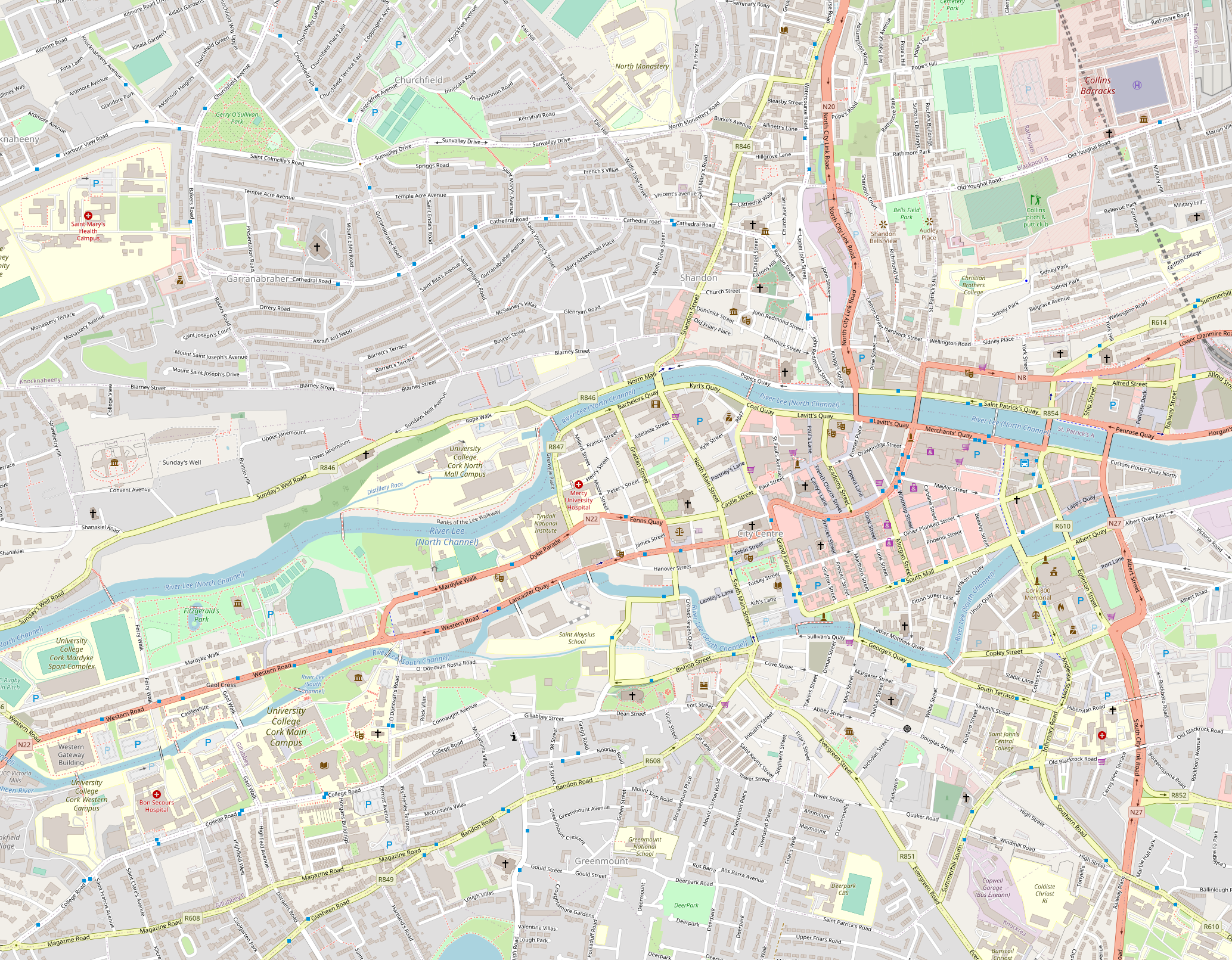
- Location within Cork Central
- Established: 1850 (as Cork School of Design); 1880 (as Crawford Art School); 1979 (as Crawford Art Gallery)
- Location: Emmet Place, Cork, Ireland
- Coordinates: 51.8998°N 8.4733°W
- Type: Municipal art gallery
- Key holdings: Greek and Roman sculpture casts (1818)
- Collection size: c.4,000 works
- Visitors: 265,438 (2019)
- Website: crawfordartgallery.ie

The Crawford Art Gallery (Irish: Áiléar Crawford) is a public art gallery and museum in the city of Cork, Ireland. Known informally as the Crawford, it was designated a 'National Cultural Institution' in 2006. It is "dedicated to the visual arts, both historic and contemporary", and welcomed 265,438 visitors in 2019. The gallery is named after William Horatio Crawford.

== History ==
The Crawford is based in the centre of Cork in what used to be the Cork Customs House, built in 1724. The Customs House became home to the Royal Cork Institution (RCI) in the 1830s, and the RCI was involved in opening the Cork School of Design on the site in 1850.

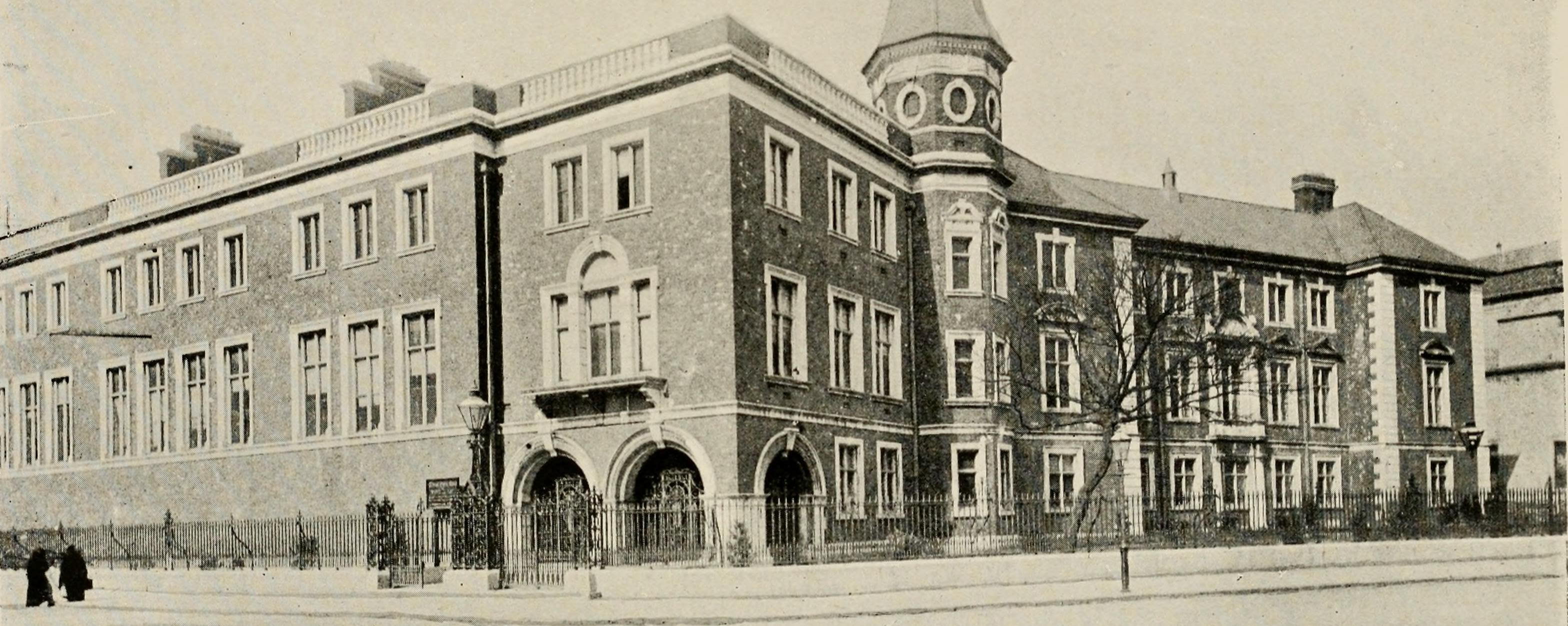
The gallery building in 1902, then the Crawford School of Art

In the early 1880s, the Cork School of Design was extended with funds and patronage from members of the Crawford family, who were local landowners and brewers. For this reason the school was renamed as the Crawford School of Art in 1885.

In 1979, the art school transferred to another site, and the Crawford building used primarily as a gallery and museum. The museum buildings were substantially extended in 2000.

== Collections ==
Among the earliest acquisitions in the gallery's collection are casts of classical Greek and Roman statues by Antonio Canova. These were brought to Cork from the Vatican in 1818. The Royal Cork Institution acquired these works from the Society of Fine Arts in Cork, who had been given the casts by the Prince Regent (later George IV of the United Kingdom). He in turn had received them from Pope Pius VII, who had commissioned Antonio Canova to make a set of plasters from statues in the Vatican. Among the works are casts of the Belvedere Torso, Apollo Belvedere and Laocoön and His Sons.

Due to the gallery's association with the Cork School of Art (later known as the Crawford College of Art and Design), some items in the museum collection are by staff and students of the school. These include works by James Brenan (who was headmaster of the school from 1860 to 1889) and students such as Henry Jones Thaddeus and William Gerard Barry.

Other items in the collection include works by sculptors such as John Hogan and Eilis O'Connell, stained-glass artists like Harry Clarke and Evie Hone, painters including William Orpen (a student of James Brenan), Jack B. Yeats, and Nano Reid, as well as photographer Bob Carlos Clarke.

The gallery hosts education and outreach programmes, and manages temporary and travelling exhibitions.

== Redevelopment ==
In March 2023 planning permission was granted for the redevelopment of the gallery. If completed as proposed, the redevelopment would increase the size of the gallery by 1,919 square metres (20,660 sq ft) and involve the refurbishment and reconfiguration of 3,641 square metres (39,190 sq ft) of existing space. The works, which include the reorientation of the gallery to face Emmet Place, are scheduled to begin in Autumn 2024.

== See also ==
- Royal Cork Institution
- List of tourist attractions in Ireland
