= Cuvierian Society of Cork =

The Cuvierian Society of Cork was founded as a committee of the Royal Cork Institution in October 1835. The meetings were held on the first Wednesday of the Autumn and Winter months in the Library of the Royal Cork Institution. The Society was named after the noted French naturalist and zoologist, Georges Cuvier. In its early years, it concentrated on the natural sciences but by the mid 19th century, it had evolved to be mainly archaeological.

In 1845, The society published the "Contributions towards a fauna and Flora of the County of Cork" of which the authors were J.R Harvey, J.D. Humphreys and T. Power. This was prepared for the meeting of the British Association held in Cork in 1843. The book contains a list of the officers of the Society for 1845. An occasional meeting is reported in the Natural History Review (1 229, 2 6).

== Notable members ==
Among the members were:

- Abraham Abell (1789–1851)
- George Boole
- Richard Caulfield (1823–1887)
- Robert Day (1836–1914)
- Thomas Crofton Croker (1798–1854)
- Thomas P. Lane
- John Lindsay
- Matthew Horgan
- Richard Sainthill
- John Willes
- John Windele (1801–1865)

In the years of its existence its membership contained many professional people, academics, and antiquarians.
