= Abraham Abell =

Irish antiquarian

- Born: 11 April 1782; Cork, Ireland
- Died: 12 February 1851
- Occupation: Antiquarian

Abraham Abell (11 April 1782 – 12 February 1851) was an Irish antiquarian.

== Early career ==
Abell was born in Cork, Ireland on 11 April 1782, into a Quaker family of eleven children. His family had long standing in business. He also was successful in business and noted for his charity. He served as treasurer of the Cork Dispensary and Humane Society. He died on 12 February 1851.

== Cultural interests ==
He had a great interest in archaeology and did a study of the Irish Round Tower. He was responsible for the first collection of Ogham stone inscriptions and his collection is now on public display at University College Cork. He had a major collection of books. He was a member of the Royal Cork Institution and one of the founders in 1835 of the Cuvierian Society. This was the forerunner of the Cork Historical and Archaeological Society.

At the time of his death, Abell's personal library contained about 4,500 volumes, including books written in Italian, French, Latin, German, Spanish, Greek, Hebrew, and Irish.

== Sources ==
- Beecher, Seán (2005). Cork 365: A Day-by-day Miscellany of Cork History. Collins Press. ISBN 1-903464-92-7.
- Harrison, Richard S (1999). Abraham Abell: Member of the Royal Irish Academy and Corkman Extraordinary. Red Barn Pub. ISBN 0-9537630-0-5.
- "Abell, Abraham". Dictionary of Irish Biography (online ed.). Royal Irish Academy. October 2009. doi:10.3318/dib.000006.v1.
