= Claire Keville =

Irish concertina and harpsichord player

Claire Keville is an Irish concertina and harpsichord player from Galway. She attended University College Cork to study music. She graduated with a bachelor's degree in arts, a B.Mus. and completed a H. Dip. Keville then went to the University of Limerick where she completed her master's degree. While at UCC she trained at the Cork School of Music with Spanish pianist Angel Climent. Keville works as a musician and has recorded Irish traditional music. She has albums called Irish Music on the Clavichord, Irish Music on the Harpsichord and The Daisy Field.

Keville teaches music in workshops and at the Willie Clancy Summer School in County Clare. She also works as a broadcaster on Clare FM radio. She has appeared on TG4 both as a guest and presenter.
