= Royal Cork Institution =

Defunct library and museum in Cork, Ireland

Royal Cork Institution was an Irish cultural institution in the city of Cork from 1803 to 1885. It consisted of a library of scientific works, a museum with old Irish manuscripts and stones with ogham inscriptions, and lecture and reading rooms. A lack of funds resulted in its closure in 1885.

== Origins ==
The Royal Cork Institution (RCI) was founded by Rev. Thomas Dix Hincks, a minister of the Old Presbyterian Church on Princes Street in Cork and was modelled on institutions such as the Royal Dublin Society and the Royal Society of London. It was incorporated in 1807 and renamed the Royal Cork Institution (RCI). It operated from premises on the South Mall opposite the current Imperial hotel and was a British government supported educational centre for 70 years. Its early patrons included businesses and landed people including William Beamish (1760–1828), William Sharman Crawford (1781–1861), Cooper Penrose (1736–1815) and James Roche (1770–1853). It offered courses, public lectures on science and scientific principles in agriculture and industry. The RCI had a collection of scientific instruments and library of over 5,000 volumes with a private and a public patents collection - a copy of this is in the Boole Library of University College Cork.

== Activities ==
The RCI established the Cork Botanic Gardens in 1806. A shortage of funds in 1828 forced the withdrawal of the RCI, and the property was later to become a cemetery. The RCI was influential in the Government decision to establish the Queen's College in Cork. It published the first volume of the Munster Farmer's Magazine in 1812. It also established the Crawford College of Art and Design, now part of the Cork Institute of Technology (CIT). It was connected with medical schools and gave lectures on anatomy. Lack of funds necessitated the RCI becoming a private society in 1850 and its closure in 1885. Among those associated with the RCI were Richard Caulfield (at one time its secretary and librarian), Robert Day and Abraham Abell. The RCI had an influential role in the intellectual life of Cork until the Cork Cuvierian Society. This in turn was supplanted with the establishment of Queen's College, Cork, in 1849.

== Canova casts ==
The RCI acquired these from the Society of Fine Arts in Cork, who were given them by the Prince Regent later George IV. He had received them from Pope Pius VII who had commissioned Antonio Canova to make a set of plasters from statues in the Vatican. The statues are currently in the Crawford Municipal Art Gallery.

== See also ==
- Historic Cork Gardens
- Crawford College of Art and Design
