= Cork Institute of Technology =

Former higher educational institution in Ireland

- Institiúid Teicneolaíochta Chorcaí
- Crest of the institute
- Former names: Cork Regional Technical College
- Motto: Rísam Uile
- Motto in English: Let us all achieve
- Active: 1974–2020
- Academic staff: 862
- Students: 17,000
- Location: Rossa Avenue, Cork, Munster, T12 P928, Ireland; 51.8839°N 8.5358°W
- Campus: CIT Cork, Bishopstown National Maritime College of Ireland, Ringaskiddy, Cork Cork School of Music, Cork City Crawford College of Art, Cork City
- Website: www.cit.ie

Cork Institute of Technology (CIT; Irish: Institiúid Teicneolaíochta Chorcaí) was an institute of technology, located in Cork, Ireland. Upon its dissolution, the institute had 17,000 students studying in art, business, engineering, music, drama and science disciplines. The institute had been named as Institute of Technology of the Year in The Sunday Times University Guide for Ireland on numerous occasions. On 1 January 2021, the institute merged with the Institute of Technology, Tralee to become the Munster Technological University, Ireland's second technological university.

Cork Institute of Technology consisted of two constituent faculties and three constituent colleges. The constituent faculties were Engineering and Science, and Business and Humanities. The constituent colleges were the CIT Crawford College of Art and Design, the CIT Cork School of Music and the National Maritime College of Ireland. Faculties were made up of Schools which in turn comprise two or more academic departments.

As of May 2020, CIT had 1,465 staff members of whom 862 were academic staff.

== History ==
Cork Institute of Technology, and its predecessor Cork Regional Technical College (CRTC), developed from earlier institutions such as the Royal Cork Institution which existed from 1807 until 1861, and the Crawford Municipal Technical Institute which was founded in 1912, which trained students in Science and Engineering. In 1930 the City of Cork Vocational Education Committee was set up. Cork Regional Technical College was established in 1974 and the Crawford Institute was merged with the new Cork RTC in 1976.

Following enactment of the Regional Technical Colleges Act 1992, it incorporated the Cork School of Music and the Crawford College of Art and Design on 1 January 1993. In late 1997 it was renamed from Regional Technical College, Cork, to Cork Institute of Technology.

James P. Roche who was head of Crawford, became the first principal of Cork RTC. Dr. Patrick Kelleher became principal of the RTC in 1988, and the director of Cork IT until 2004. In 2007 the title of the head of the institute changed from "Director" to "President". Dr. Brendan J. Murphy was director/president from 2004 until retiring in 2017. He was succeeded by Dr. Barry O'Connor.

In March 2008, it was announced that CIT was applying for university status. On 1 January 2021, the institute merged with the Institute of Technology, Tralee to become the Munster Technological University, Ireland's second technological university.

== Staff ==
The institute's 2020 staff complement was 1,465, 862 being academic staff. The academic staff consisted of 473 permanent whole-time, 156 pro-rata part-time and 233 hourly-paid part-time members. The non-academic staff was composed of technical support, library, administrative and services staff. The non-academic staff members broke down as follows: 131 management, clerical, administrative and library; 177 student services, including examination invigilators; 82 technicians; 67 research staff; and 96 support staff including caretakers, attendants and cleaners.

== Research ==
Research was a core dimension of CIT activity. This is underlined by the fact that, after Dublin Institute of Technology, CIT has the most extensive delegated authority to award PhDs. In collaboration with a wide range of organisations including Higher Education Institutions, Industry, State and Voluntary Bodies, CIT is involved in research that contributes to supporting:

- Regional and National Industry.
- The National and EU knowledge economy and Innovation Base.
- Enhanced quality of life within Irish society.
- Quality research postgraduate education at Masters and PhD level.
- Quality undergraduate and taught postgraduate teaching and learning.

The main Institute research activity was primarily, though not exclusively, organised around three Strategic Research Clusters that reflect the CIT current dominant strategic research strengths and critical mass. There are also new and emerging areas of research and a number of long established centres that engage in research and consultancy. Across the Institute faculties and constituent colleges, academic staff research interests range across Engineering, Science, Business and Humanities, Music and Art. The CIT Research mission is to continue to build on niche strengths and to develop sustainable and productive research, innovation, technology transfer and postgraduate education across all its faculties.

CIT hosted the 2011 Collaborative European Research Conference at its Blackrock Castle Observatory.

=== NIMBUS Centre ===
On 17 January 2010, CIT took possession of the new NIMBUS Centre for Embedded Systems Research and, on 16 March 2010, 65 researchers and students relocated from diverse locations in CIT to the NIMBUS building.

Funded through the HEA Programme for Research in Third Level Institutions (PRTLI) in 2007, NIMBUS was the first building nationally to be completed in the 4th cycle of PRTLI funding and reflects collaboration and project management by the CIT Development Office, the architects RKD, building contractors Walls and the team of researchers for whom the building was designed.

A research centre at the NIMBUS Centre is adjacent to and attached to the Rubicon Centre and its extension. The NIMBUS Centre provides space for up to 80 researchers, including facilities for undergraduate project students, visiting postgraduate students and researchers from other institutions and dedicated industry visitor workstations, where company researchers can work in collaboration with NIMBUS staff and use NIMBUS research facilities. A large area of the ground floor is given over to an open-plan laboratory space.

== Academic alliances ==
CIT holds a partnership with the Darmstadt University of Applied Sciences (h_da), Germany. CIT's BA in Multimedia offers a joint accreditation from CIT and h_da.

CIT offer a number of degree courses in conjunction with University College Cork, including their BSc in Architecture and BSc in Biomedical Science.

The CIT Blackrock Castle Observatory runs a programme in partnership with the Chabot Space & Science Center in Oakland, California.

CIT has also established various industrial alliances, particularly with Dell EMC and VMware, both of which have a business presence in Cork. The college also maintains close ties with Cisco Systems and the Cisco Networking Academy. CIT is itself both an official VMware and Cisco academy, as well as a Microsoft, Novell and ITIL academy.

== Incubation and innovation programmes ==
=== Rubicon Centre ===
The Rubicon Centre is a business incubation centre and is located on campus at CIT. Home to over 40 knowledge-based start-up companies, the centre is jointly financed by CIT & Enterprise Ireland. Clients based at the Rubicon are at different stages of development, from concept stage to completing their first customer orders. In 2007, a second incubation facility was opened to accommodate the demand for on-campus incubation space. An extension to the existing building was due to be operational by June 2010.

The centre's role as an incubator is to assist the formation and growth of early stage, knowledge intensive businesses, by providing physical space, in-house management support, access to advice and support from Institute resources.

=== Genesis Programme ===
The Genesis Enterprise Programme is based at CIT's Rubicon Centre, offering participants the opportunity to avail of a 12-month rapid incubation programme that aims to support and accelerate graduate entrepreneurs in developing their business from a very early stage. It has been in operation since 1998. The programme supports entrepreneurs (for "knowledge based" fields "with export potential" such as Food, Information Technology, Biotech, Telecommunications, Renewable Energy, Medical Device and Automotive) in the South West region. It is supported by the Department of Education and Science, with participant support from Enterprise Ireland.

The programme is a full-time programme for graduates and is supported by University College Cork, Enterprise Ireland, Cork's County and City Enterprise Boards, Údarás Na Gaeltachta, and Cork BIC.

=== Innovation prize ===
Run in association with the Cork Enterprise Board, the 'CIT Prize for Innovation' awards those whose inventions and business ideas are judged "most creative, novel, innovative, and likely to succeed in the marketplace". The prize is open to all departments and entrants may use a project that form part of their coursework for the year. Entrants must be full-time or part-time students (including postgraduate students) at CIT during the current academic year. The awards are accompanied by a series of cash prizes, and in 2010 a prize fund of €10,000 was allocated.

== Main campus ==
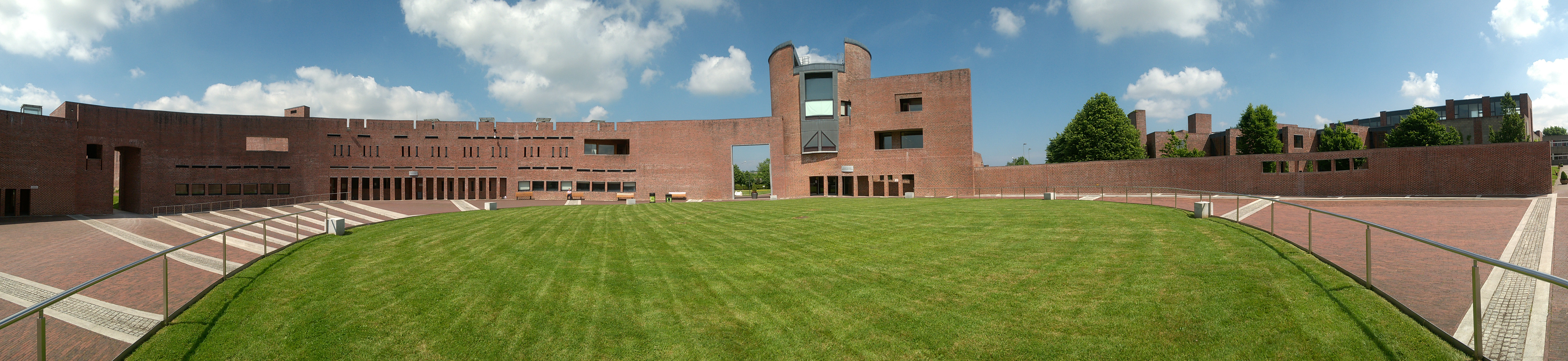
Panorama of the central circular courtyard

The main campus of some eighty acres is situated in Bishopstown, in the western suburbs of Cork city. It is equipped with theatres, lecture rooms, laboratories, drawing studios, a library, computer suites, open access computing centre and research units. Recreational facilities for students include a running track, tennis courts, all-weather pitch, a gymnasium and grass playing pitches. A new indoor swimming pool is located immediately adjacent to the institute. The campus holds a mixture of concrete panelled buildings and extensive modern brick architecture.

CIT's main campus has won awards for its architectural design and aesthetics.

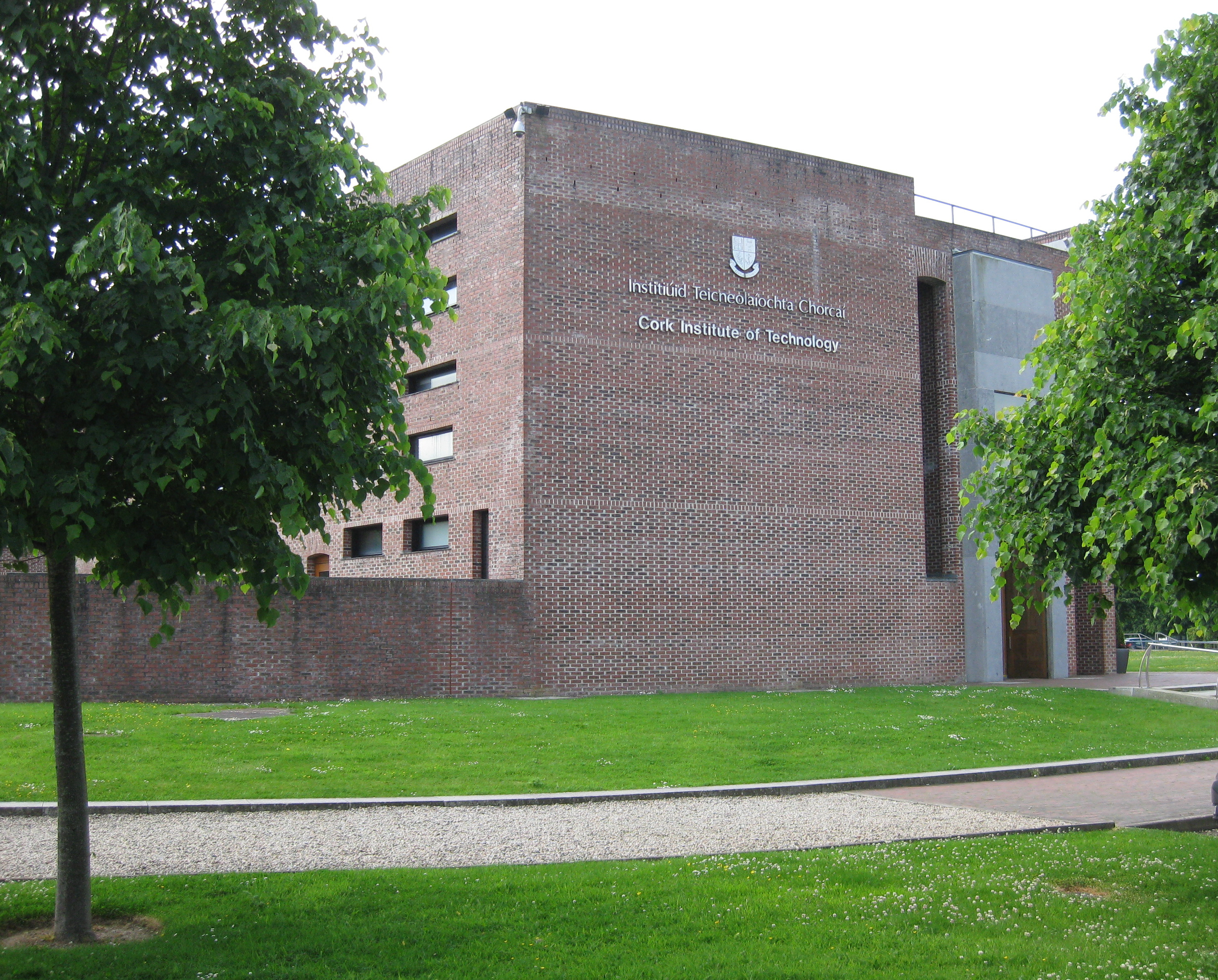
Name by entrance at Bishopstown

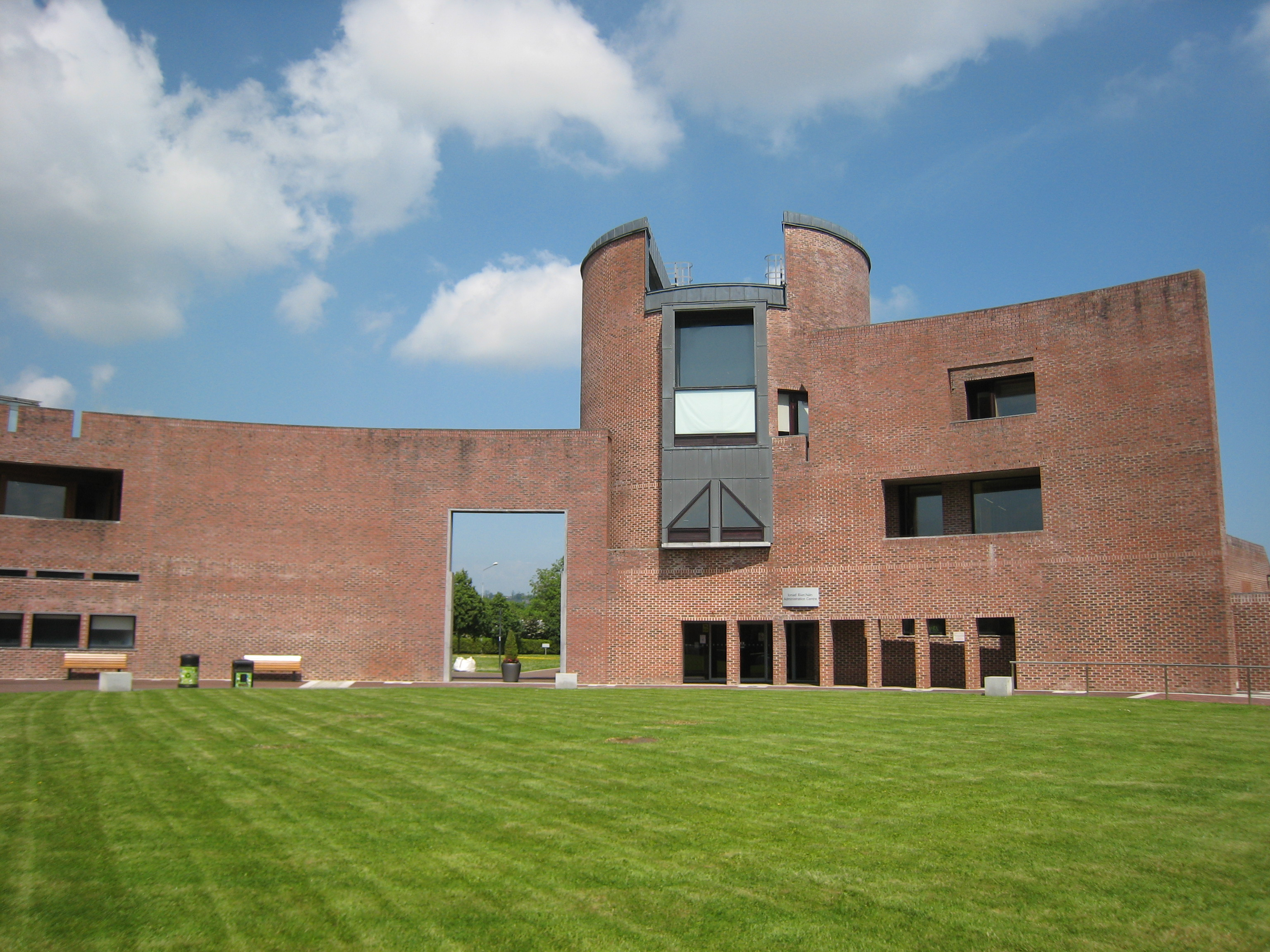
Administrative Centre

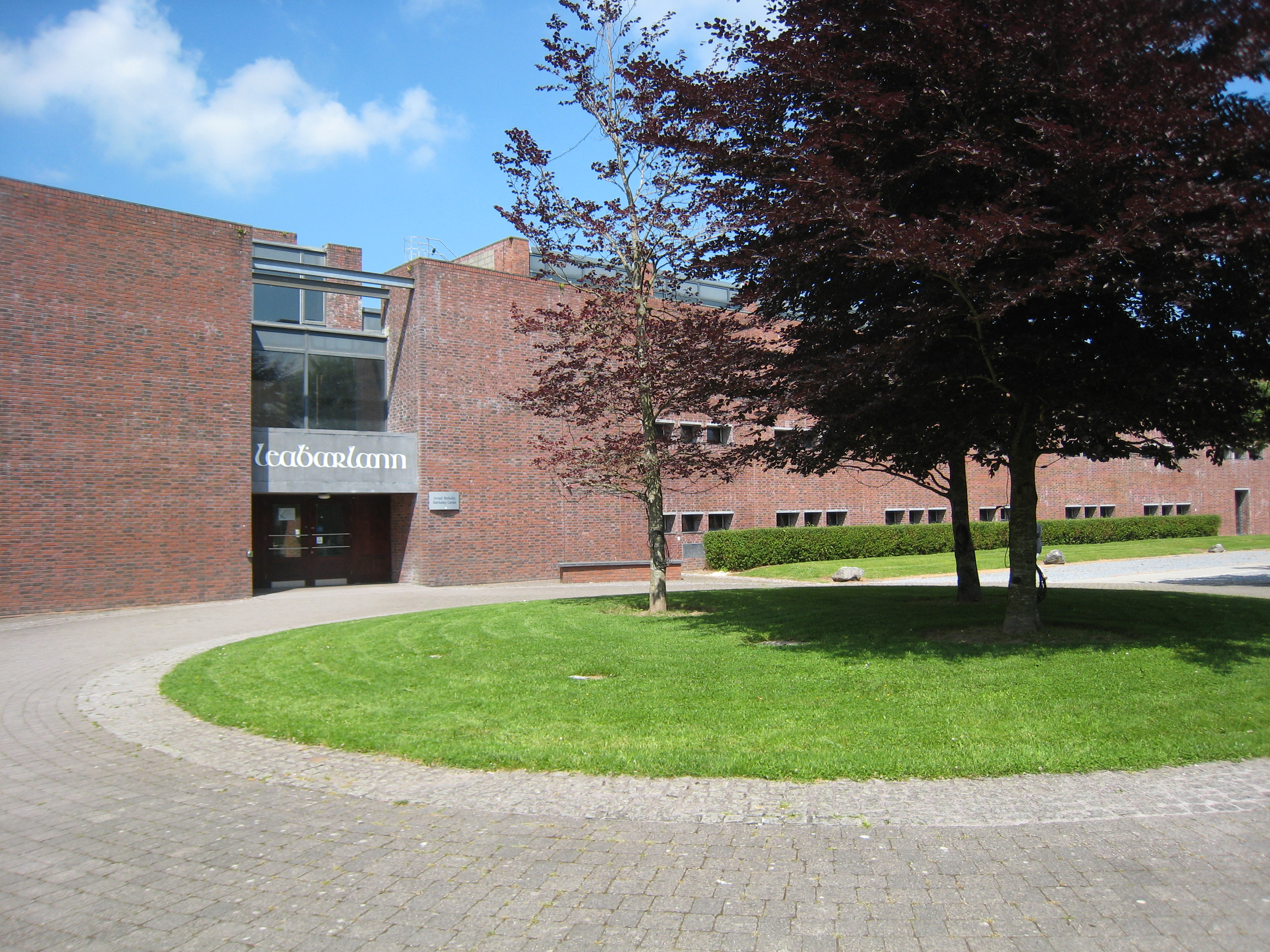
Berkeley Centre and Library

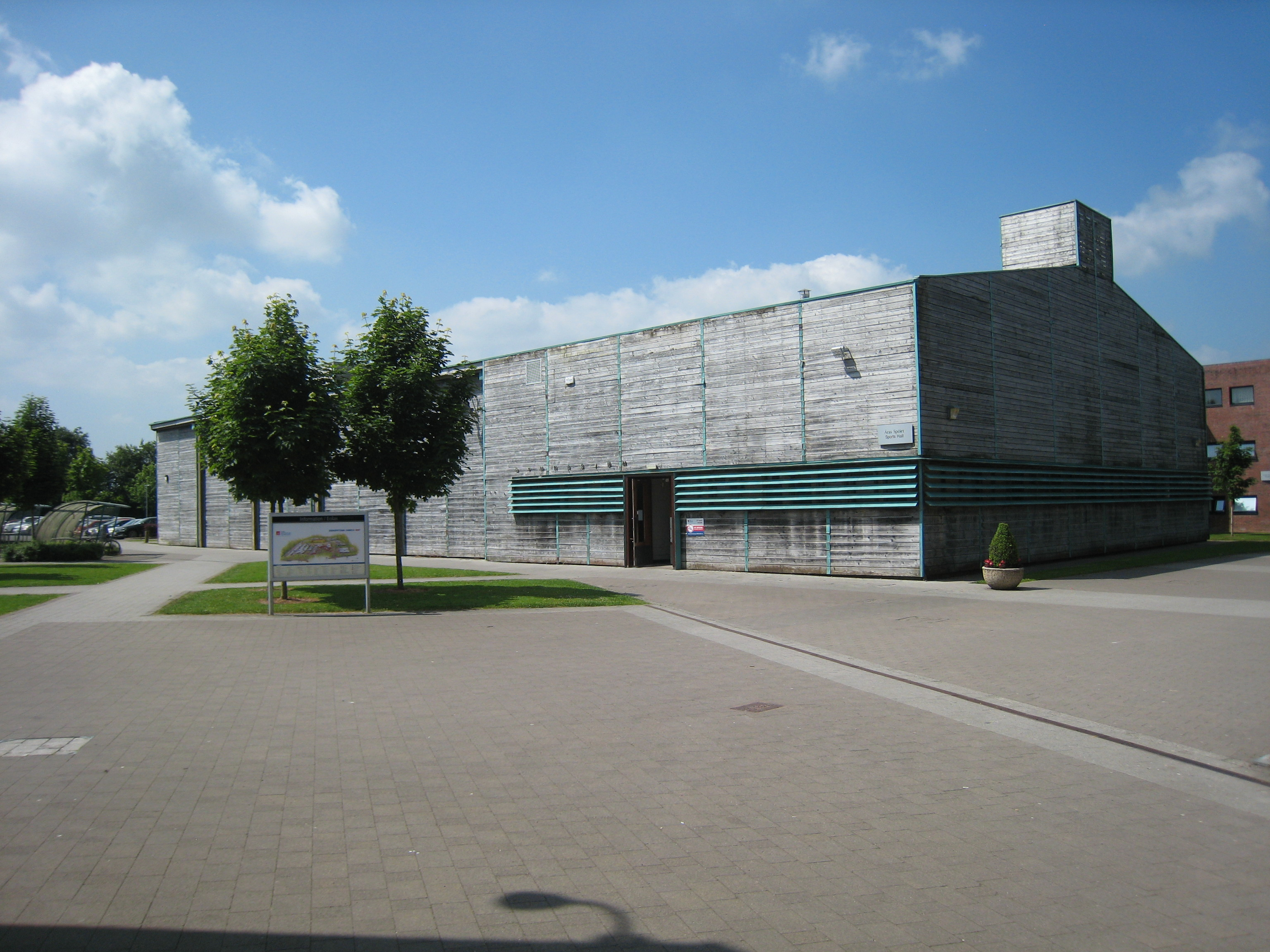
Sports Hall

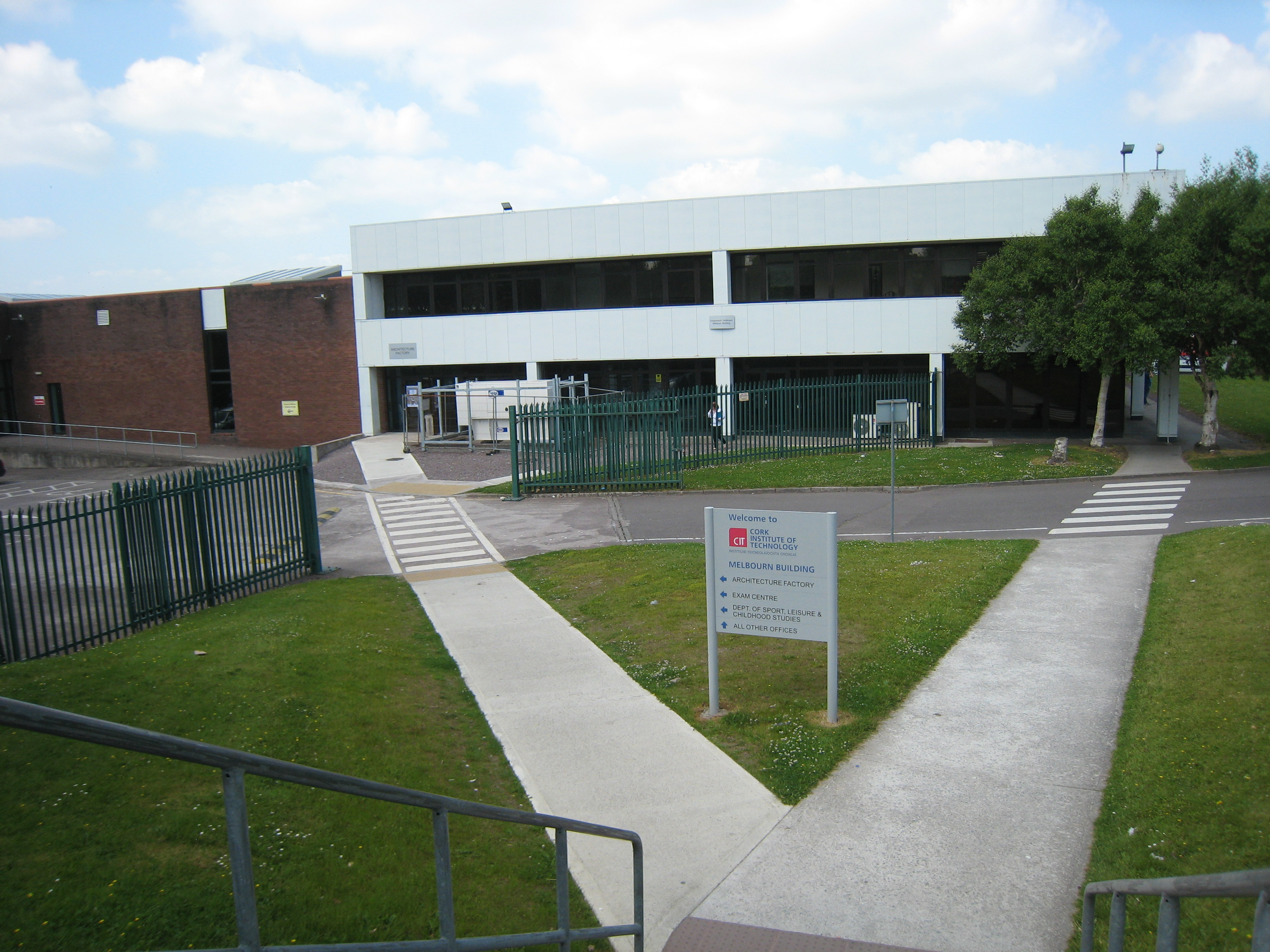
Melbourn Building (Architecture)

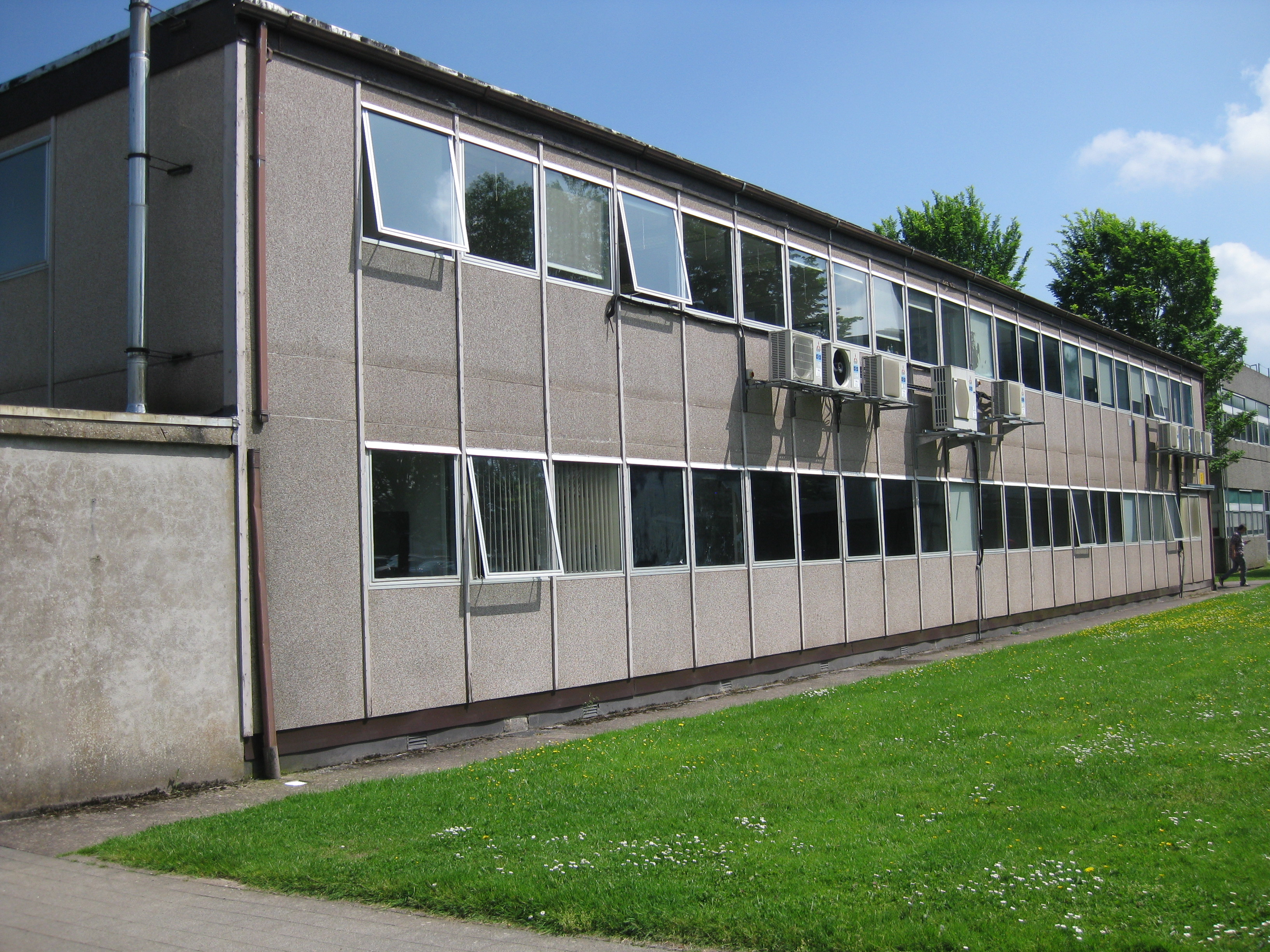
Typical concrete panelled buildings at Bishopstown

== Constituents ==
CIT has a number of constituent colleges and facilities. These are located off its main campus, and include the CIT Cork School of Music, CIT Crawford College of Art and Design, National Maritime College of Ireland and CIT Blackrock Castle Observatory.

=== CIT Cork School of Music ===
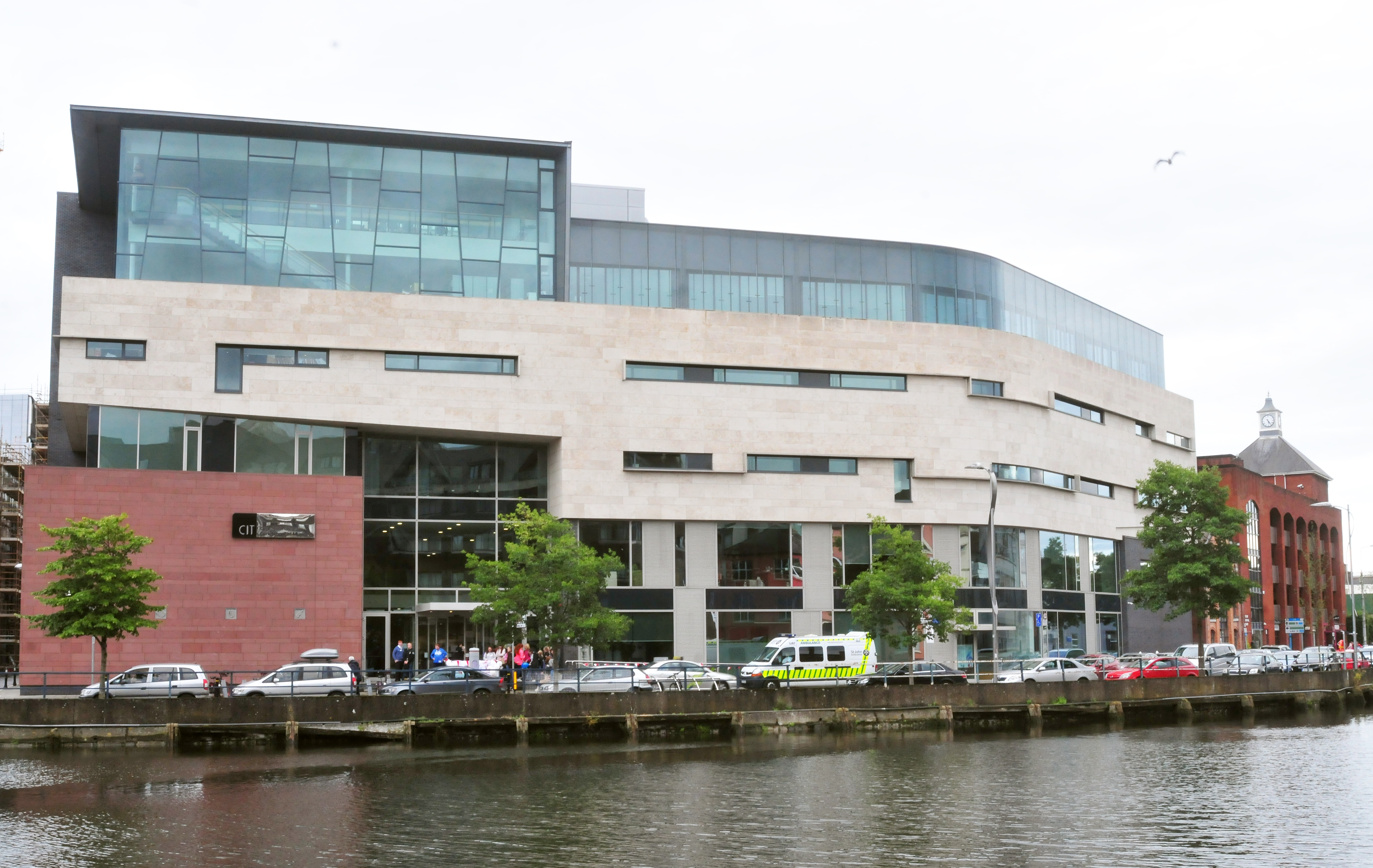
CIT Cork School of Music

The CIT Cork School of Music, formerly the Cork Municipal School of Music, is located in the centre of Cork City. The college was founded in 1878 and became a school of Cork Institute of Technology in 1993. The school operates primarily from a five-floor purpose-built conservatory which was built on the site of an earlier premises. It opened on Union Quay in 2007 and was designed by Murray Ó Laoire Architects.

With over three thousand enrolments, CIT Cork School of Music offers conservatory music and drama courses, from pre-school kindermusic classes, part-time instrumental, vocal and drama lessons, life-long-learning classes and performance ensembles to its full-time degree courses at bachelors, masters and doctoral level. Four hundred third-level students study on the four-year BMus, BA in Popular Music, BA in Musical Theatre, and BA in Theatre & Drama Studies; Masters in Performance and Music Technology; and PhD programmes.

Cork School of Music's Union Quay building hosts sixty Steinway pianos. The acoustics were provided by Applied Acoustic Design. The building incorporates three performance spaces, the Curtis Auditorium, Stack "Black Box" Theatre and the main Atrium which also functions as an art gallery. The building has a recording suite, six lecture theatres, the Fleischmann Library, two audio labs, an I.T. lab, over 50 teaching and practice studios, 5 medium-sized classrooms, 5 full sized classrooms each acoustically isolated to also act as practice rooms. Under the same roof is the Off-Quay restaurant, and a common room for full-time students with large open plan areas on all floors.

The school also has two harpsichords constructed in 2007 by the harpsichord-maker Michael Johnson, as well as housing the 1999 Michael Johnson instrument owned by Cork County Council.

=== CIT Crawford College of Art and Design ===
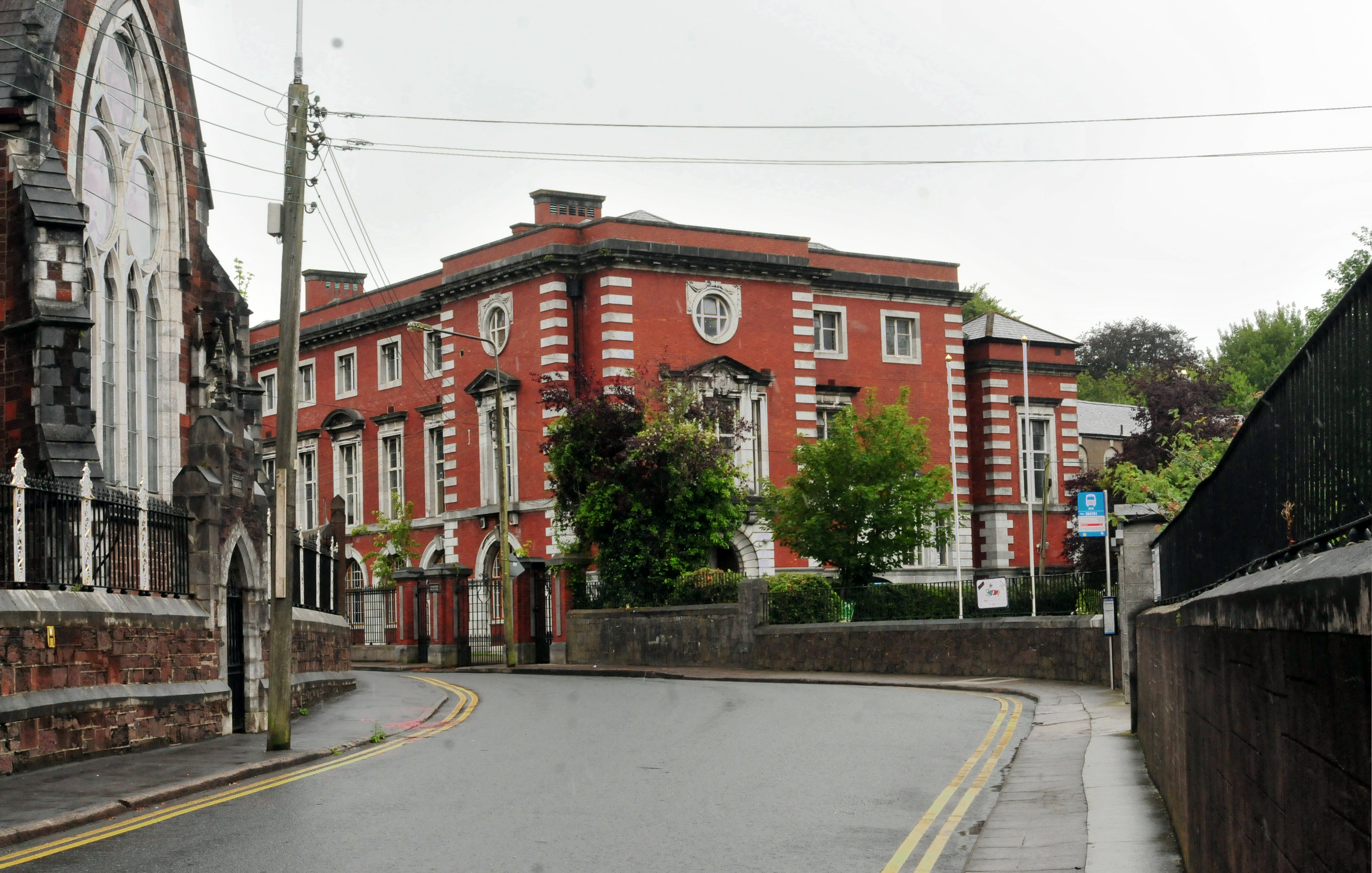
CIT Crawford College of Art and Design

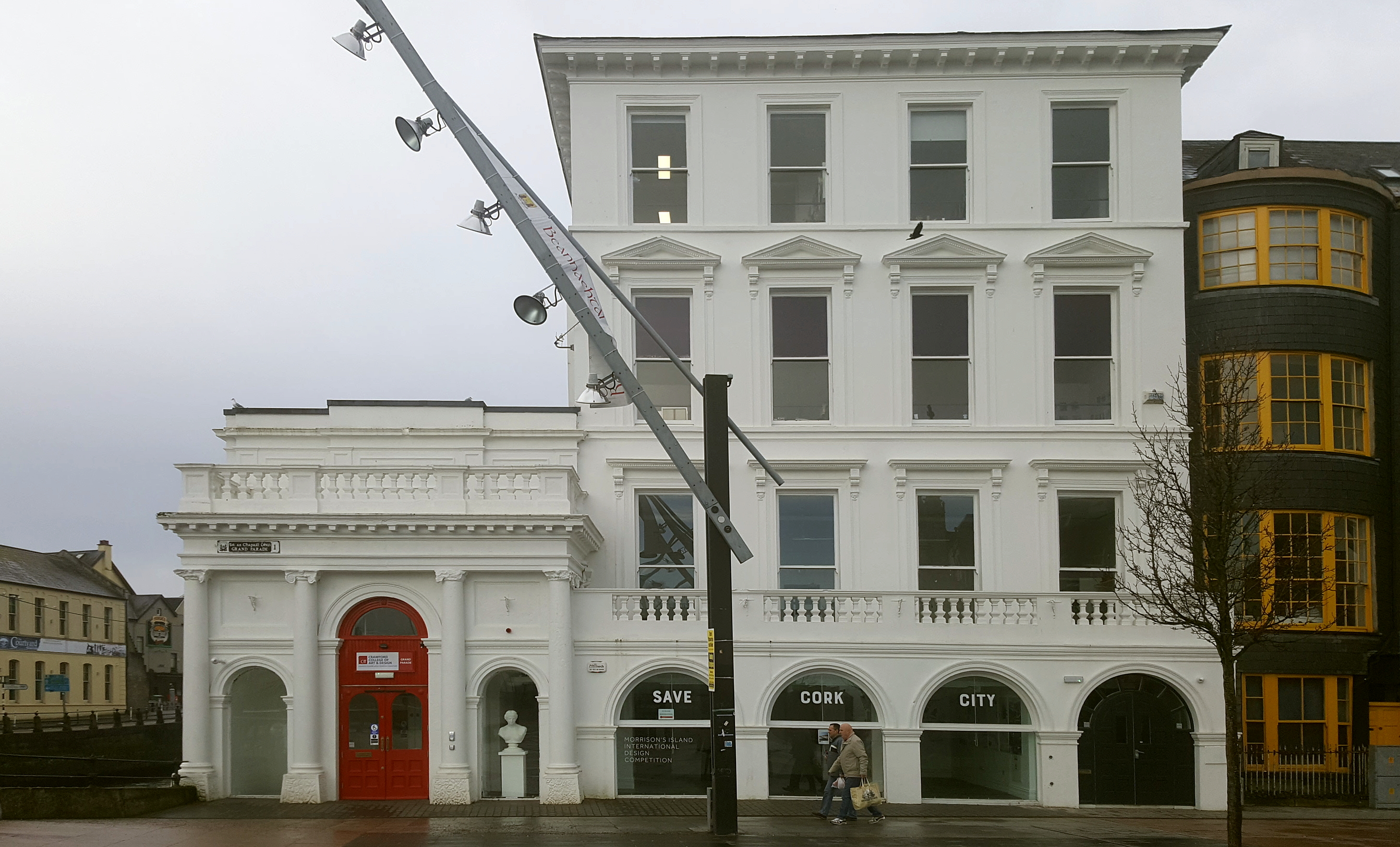
New C.I.T. Crawford building Grand Parade

The CIT Crawford College of Art & Design is a constituent college of Cork Institute of Technology. The CIT Crawford College offers full-time courses to bachelor's degree, Masters and Higher Diploma levels, all validated by CIT and the Higher Education and Training Awards Council (HETAC).

The college is sited in its own campus in Sharman Crawford Street, approximately four miles from the main CIT campus in Bishopstown. The Crawford College of Art & Design is located near the primary art centres and schools in Cork.

CIT's Department of Fine Art and the Department of Art & Design Education are based at the Sharman Crawford Street campus, offering programmes in Fine Art, Ceramics and Art Education. CIT's Department of Media Communications became part of the Crawford College in January 2010. However, both the Department of Media Communications and the Department of Art Therapy are based at the college's Bishopstown campus.

Facilities at the Sharman Crawford Street campus include studios with personal work spaces for all students, and well-equipped workshops including ceramics, metal and wood fabrication, stone carving, foundry, photography, film and video, digital media, etching, lithography, silk screen and relief printmaking, textiles and stained glass. The library houses over 12,000 volumes, 45 periodicals and newspapers, and over 30,000 slides.

The CIT Crawford College of Art and Design has its origins in the Cork School of Design of 1850, which was associated with the Royal Cork Institution. The building that originally housed the college was built in 1724 as Cork's Custom House. In 1979 the college was transferred to its current location on Sharman Crawford Street, near Saint Fin Barre's Cathedral. The Crawford College of Art and Design has close ties to the Crawford Art Gallery, which is located in the college's former building. The Crawford Art Gallery houses John Butt's View of Cork, which was painted circa 1755, and shows the influence of Dutch trade on the early architecture of Cork.

Irish landscape painter James Brenan (RHA) was headmaster of the school from 1860 to 1889. It was he who influenced William Horatio Crawford, from the famous brewing family, to invest in the School, leading to the 1884 extension and subsequent renaming of the school to the Crawford Municipal School of Art. Under the Institutes of Technology Act 2006, the Crawford College of Art and Design became a designated school of the Cork Institute of Technology.

Principals of Crawford includes James Brenan, William Mulligan, Hugh Charde (1919-1937), John F. King, Jim Barry, Teddy Murphy and Jim Roche who was appointed in 1968, and went on to be the first principal of Cork RTC.

=== National Maritime College of Ireland ===
The National Maritime College of Ireland (NMCI) is a joint project between the Cork Institute of Technology and the Irish Naval Service.The joint delivery of programmes with the Defence Forces in Leadership, Management, Engineering and Computing up to and including Masters level. It is located in Ringaskiddy, County Cork, Ireland. The college provides a range of maritime qualifications, including at academic degree level, and its facilities can accommodate 750 students.

The college cost approximately €50 million when opened in October 2004 and was one of the first public private partnership type projects in education in the Republic of Ireland.

The college facilities include systems for training deck department personnel, including several bridge simulators, such as a 360-degree model and a 270-degree model. Workshops are provided for ropework and other deck associated skills, and simulators are provided for GMDSS training and cargo work. Engine department trainees avail of a fully functional engine room, which includes diesel engines, oil purifiers, air compressors, sewage treatment plant, fresh water generators and other equipment found on board oceangoing vessels. An engine room simulator is used to train personnel in watchkeeping, teamwork and process management. Common facilities include the survival training pool, helicopter dunker, lifeboats and firefighting training facility. Machine workshops are utilised to train engineers in turning, milling, grinding, welding and the use of hand tools for fabrication. There is a marine library on site, but with limited access.

In September 2006, King Harald and Queen Sonja of Norway visited the NMCI, while on a state visit to Ireland, to promote maritime links between Cork and Oslo.

=== CIT Blackrock Castle Observatory ===
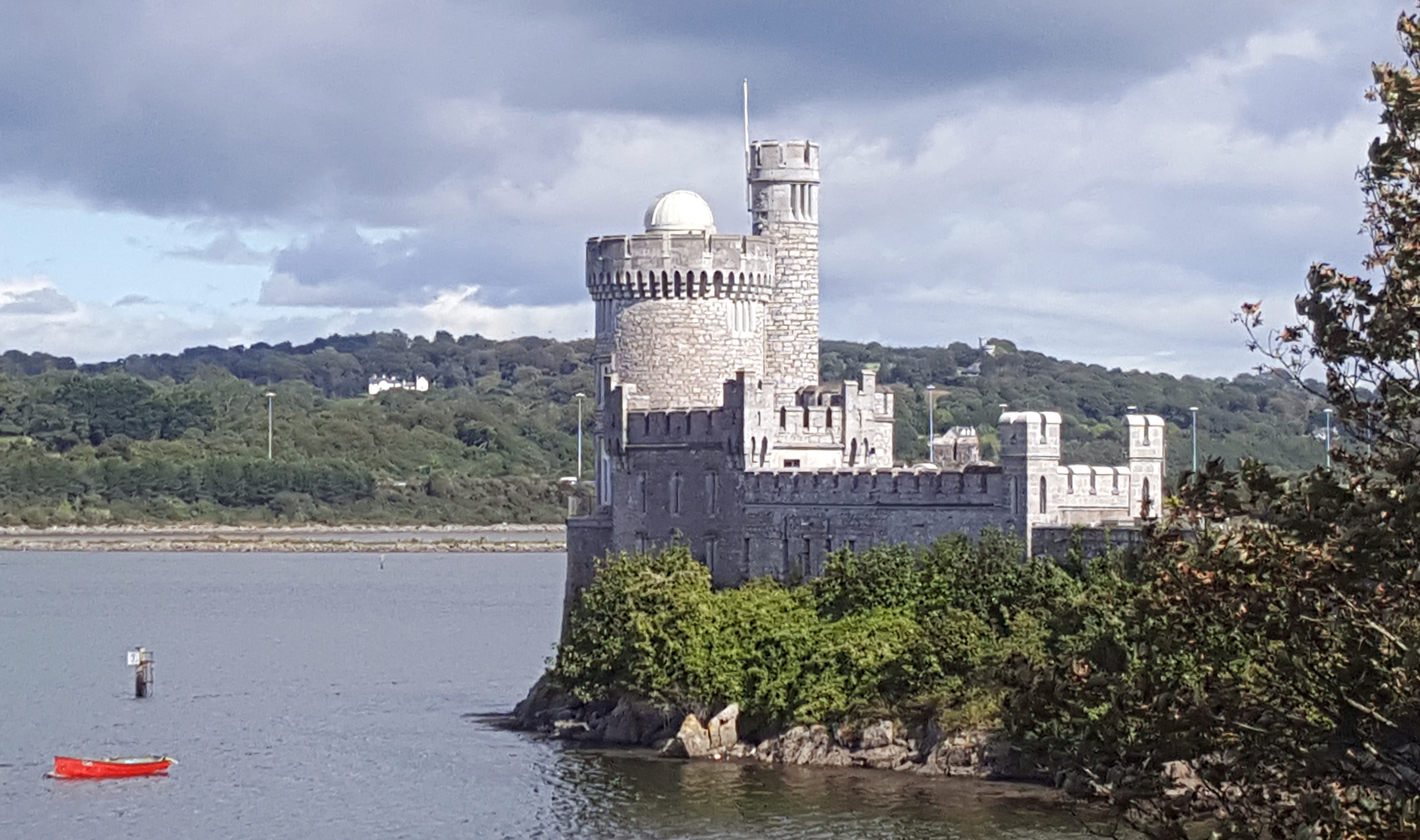
CIT Blackrock Castle Observatory

Blackrock Castle was originally built on the River Lee in 1582 by the citizens of Cork as a watch tower and fort, assuring trade ships of a safe haven, the Elizabethan government of the era ordering a round tower constructed to protect against marauding pirates and other invaders. Following a charter by James I in 1608, Blackrock Castle was handed over to the City of Cork. In 1722 the old tower was destroyed by fire and was rebuilt with an octagonal room topped with a cupola. The castle was used at this time as the Corporation banquet hall. In 1827 the castle was again destroyed by fire, before being rebuilt a year later, three additional storeys and out-buildings being added at that time. In 2002 the castle underwent an extensive refurbishment programme, and in August 2007, Blackrock Castle was re-opened to the public as the CIT Blackrock Castle Observatory.

Cosmos at the Castle is an interactive astronomy exhibit that takes place at the observatory, featuring four cinema sized screens that share information with visitors on the Big Bang, the evolution of life on Earth, and the existence of extraterrestrial life in the Universe.

The observatory also houses a team of astronomical researchers and scientists from CIT, most of which are engaged in the development of new technologies designed for searching for planets around distant stars, a project known as the Planet Search Programme. Most of the researchers come from the Astronomy and Instrumentation Group, based within the Department of Applied Physics and Instrumentation at CIT.

The observatory features a rooftop 16" Meade reflector telescope. A monthly remote astronomy schools project is run at the observatory. The project is entitled Web of Stars, and is run in conjunction with the Chabot Space & Science Center in Oakland, California.

CIT is the Irish partner in the Comenius funded European Union Hands on Universe project. This project trains teachers to use real astronomy data in the classroom to support the teaching of science and mathematics.

The castle hosted the 2011 Collaborative European Research Conference. In May 2011, a partnership between CIT and the National Space Centre was announced. The partnership saw the 32-metre satellite dish at Elfordstown Earthstation in Midleton, Co Cork, start a new life as a Deep Space Radio Telescope. The Deep Space Radio Telescope will be capable of detecting a host of cosmic phenomena. The dish was originally constructed in 1984 to take transatlantic telephone calls from Europe to the US, and was retired from use in the mid-1990s when the underground transatlantic cables were laid.

== Sport ==
The college has several full-size pitches, some of which are floodlit, catering to field sports, including Gaelic games, soccer and Gaelic games. The college's primary hurling and Gaelic football pitch, located on campus, offers its own stadium. CIT's athletics track is now one of the finest in the country, and also enjoys its own purpose-built stadium. In addition to its 9 playing pitches, two stadia and international standard athletics track, CIT also boasts on campus all-weather astroturf pitches, tennis courts and a sports hall. CIT offers students free membership to its small gym and weights room. LeisureWorld, one of Cork's fitness and health facilities, is adjacent the campus, and offers special membership rates to CIT students and staff.

CIT's sports grounds play host to competitions throughout the year, including schools matches in Gaelic football, hurling, soccer and rugby. In the past, CIT has hosted the Avonmore Milk Munster Youth's Cup Rugby semi-finals, Simcox, Coirn Uí Mhuirí and various other competitions. The college's facilities also cater to the training needs of various local and inter-county teams, including the Cork Ladies Football teams from underage to senior level, Cork Senior and Minor Camogies and the Cork Minor and Under-21 Hurlers. CIT is also the home ground for the Cork Admirals Flag Football games.

In 2009 CIT won the Sigerson Cup, the premier Gaelic football competition in Ireland for the first time, beating Dublin Institute of Technology by 5 points in the final. CIT enjoys a local rivalry with University College Cork.

Other sports offered by the college include martial arts such as aikido, judo, karate, kickboxing and taekwondo. In addition to Gaelic games, soccer and rugby, CIT has teams involved in field sports such as flag football and hockey. Canoeing, rowing, sailing, sub aqua, surfing, and swimming make up the college's range of water sports, while many students also participate and compete in indoor sports such as aerobics, badminton, basketball, boxing, gymnastics, trampoling, pool, racquetball, table tennis and volleyball. Various other sports played at CIT include athletics, cycling, equestrian, golf, motorsport, mountaineering, rock-climbing, mountain biking, orienteering and tennis.

CIT annually awards sports bursaries to a wide range of sports for both senior and first-year students.

CIT's Sports Office oversees the college's sporting participation and facilities. The Office facilitates students and their clubs and is responsible for the management and upkeep of all sports facilities in the institute.

== Munster Technological University ==
In May 2020, Taoiseach Leo Varadkar announced the formal approval of Munster Technological university, to begin operations in January 2021.

The proposal had been building for 3 years. The University would offer a multi-campus institution spanning across Cork and Kerry, creating a second University in the region, and third in the province of Munster. A formal application for T.U. status was lodged in February 2019.

In May 2019, academic staff of C.I.T. and I.T. Tralee rejected the merger, and an international advisory panel visited the campuses.

== Controversies ==
=== Sexual harassment claims ===
A Freedom of Information request revealed in December 2020 that Cork IT spent €55,560.79 on legal fees after sexual harassment claims during each academic year between September 2015 and the middle of 2019. Another case, which had recently arisen, was not included in the total.

== Notable alumni ==
- George Atkinson (1880–1941), printmaker, painter, designer, and head of the National College of Art attended Crawford School of Art from 1897
- Susan Bullman, immunologist and oncologist
- Alice Maher, artist
- John Burke, artist and member of Aosdana, studied at Crawford School of Art and also taught there
- Claire Keville, an Irish concertina and harpsichord player
- Vivienne Roche, sculptor and critic, Crawford School of Art (1970-1974)
- Brian Smyth, figurative painter
- Gary O'Donovan, Olympic rower
- Michael Quane, sculptor, attended Crawford School of Art
- Talos, musician, attended Cork School of Music (1982–87)

== See also ==
- Education in Cork
- Education in the Republic of Ireland
- Third-level education in the Republic of Ireland
