= Mark Bence-Jones =

British and Irish writer (1930–2010)

- Born: 29 May 1930; London
- Died: 12 April 2010 (aged 79); Nacton, Suffolk
- Occupation: Writer

Mark Adayre Bence-Jones (29 May 1930 – 12 April 2010) was a London-born writer, noted mainly for his books on Irish architecture, the British aristocracy and the British Raj. He regarded himself as being both Irish and English, seeing no contradiction in these statements of nationality.

== Life and works ==
=== Early life ===
Bence-Jones was the son of Colonel Philip Reginald Bence-Jones, who was the head of an engineering school in Lahore, India. His mother was half-French and half-English, and had been brought up in Alexandria, Egypt. Bence-Jones was born in London, in 1930, but most of his childhood was spent in India, and plans for his education in England were curtailed by the outbreak of World War II.

Following the war, the family moved to Ireland, from where they had originally come, the ancestral home had been Lisselane in County Cork, which had left family ownership in the early 1930s. They bought a decaying country house called Glenville Park, located near Cork City.

Bence-Jones completed his schooling at Ampleforth College, and went on to study history at Pembroke College, Cambridge, then agriculture at the Royal Agricultural College, at Cirencester, with the intention of running the family's estate in Ireland.

=== Works ===
Bence-Jones is best known for his authorship of Burke's Guide to Country Houses Volume 1: Ireland (1978). This was an ambitious work, trying to record the architecture of all the Irish country houses, including those that were, by then, lost or ruined. He made copious use of photographs and family albums in private ownership. He also wrote three books about India, Palaces of the Raj (1973), The Viceroys of India (1982) and Clive of India (1987). The first of these is believed to be the first book to give serious academic consideration to the subject of British architecture in India, He was the consultant editor for Burke's Irish Family Records, 1973–76.

He also tried his hand at writing novels: three comedies of upper-class life in Rome, London and Ireland. One of these received an enthusiastic review from John Betjeman, but none remain in print.

=== Personal life ===
In 1965, he was married to Gillian Enid Pretyman, granddaughter of the Conservative politician Ernest George Pretyman and author of a collection of poems: Ostrich Creek, published in 1999. They had a son and two daughters.

Bence-Jones was a devout Catholic, serving, at one time, as Chancellor of the Irish Association of the Knights of Malta (see Sovereign Military Order of Malta), and attending the Lourdes pilgrimage.

In later years, ill health prevented him from finishing a biography of his friend, the novelist Elizabeth Bowen. It also limited his travelling, and he gave the house at Glenville to his younger daughter. Bence-Jones died in hospital in April 2010.

=== Film media ===
Bence-Jones was interviewed and appeared in the documentary film The Raj In The Rain by Trust Films, filmed over ten years and released in 2012 (120 minutes run time), screened on RTÉ in 2013, with the Directors Cut DVD released in 2015.

== List of major works ==
=== Non-fiction ===
- Mark Bence-Jones, The Remarkable Irish, D. McKay Co., 1966
- Mark Bence-Jones, Palaces of the Raj: Magnificence and Misery of the Lord Sahibs, Allen and Unwin, 1973. ISBN 0-04-954017-3, ISBN 978-0-04-954017-0
- Mark Bence-Jones, Clive of India, Constable, 1974
- Mark Bence-Jones, The Cavaliers, Constable, 1976
- Mark Bence-Jones, Burke's Guide to Country Houses: Ireland. Volume 1 of Burke's and Savills Guide to Country Houses, Burke's Peerage, 1978. Revised edition: A Guide to Irish Country Houses, Constable, 1988. Second revised edition, 1990, reprinted 1996
- Mark Bence-Jones, Hugh Montgomery-Massingberd, The British Aristocracy, Constable, 1979
- Mark Bence-Jones, The Viceroys of India, Constable, 1982
- Mark Bence-Jones, Great English Homes: Ancestral Homes of England and Wales and the People Who Lived in Them, British Heritage Press, 1984. ISBN 0-517-44295-7, ISBN 978-0-517-44295-1
- Mark Bence-Jones, Twilight of the Ascendancy, Constable, 1987
- Mark Bence-Jones, The Catholic Families, Constable, 1992

=== Fiction ===
- Mark Bence-Jones, All a Nonsense, Peter Davies, 1957
- Mark Bence-Jones, Paradise Escaped, Davies, 1958
- Mark Bence-Jones, Nothing in the City, Sidgwick & Jackson, 1965
