= James Brenan =

Irish artist (1837–1907)

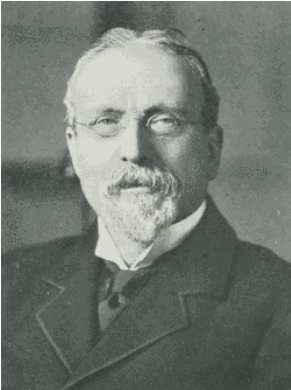
James Brenan, 1900

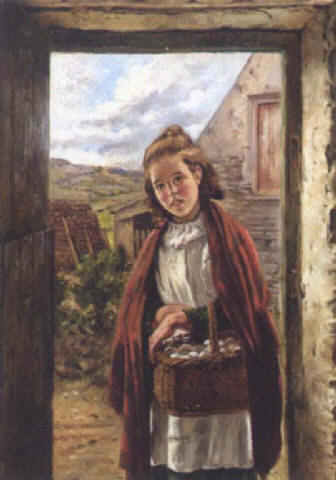
On the way to Market, by James Brenan; Oil on Canvas, 14 x 10 in. / 35.5 x 25.5 cm

James Brenan (1837 – 7 August 1907) was an Irish artist and educator. He served as the headmaster of the Cork School of Art. His name was also spelled James Brennan.

== Life ==
Brenan was born in 1837 in Dublin. He was schooled at Strong's school, Peter Street and then in Dr Stuarts in Temple Street. He then commenced his art training at the Royal Dublin Society school of design. He travelled to London at the age of fourteen to pursue decorative arts.

== Career ==
=== Artist ===
Brenan was among the most popular painters of nineteenth-century Ireland. He travelled to London where he studied decorative arts under Ownen Jones and Matthew Digby Wyatt. Between the periods of 1855 to 1860, Brenan trained in England, first at the Art Teacher Training School, Marlborough House, London. After his time spent at Marlborough, he travelled to an Art school in Birmingham, since he enjoyed the training school, Brenan move back there one year later. In 1853 when he won the prize medal for the department of science and arts.

He became headmaster of the Cork School of Art in 1860 and began working with the Royal Hibernian Academy a year later. Brenan was appointed headmaster of the Dublin Metropolitan School of Art in 1889. Among those he taught were Henry Jones Thaddeus and William Orpen. Brenan also introduced design classes to develop and advance the lace-making industry and other crafts.

Following his retirement as headmaster, George Tindall Plunkett stated that Brenan would "always be remembered for the great success which he had achieved and the very high place which the school had attained under his care among the art schools of the United Kingdom".

=== Educator ===
James Brenan began his educational career after his study at the "South Kensington Training School" where he sparked an ambition for promoting design to be applied specifically for industry as per the beliefs of the South Kensington school method, noticing a need for art education to boost vocation in the arts. He took up teaching art in schools around the United Kingdom, namely in Yarmouth and Liverpool, before returning to Ireland where he would hone his enthusiasm for design education in a seat of advantage.

Upon his return home to Dublin, Brenan was appointed as headmaster of the Cork School of Art in 1860. In his thirty-some year tenure as headmaster in Crawford, he set into motion his promotion of art design for industry in the form of workshops - the first of which was for the Convent of Mary in Kinsale, County Cork in 1884. This industrious movement expanded into the homes of housewives who determined to generate independent income for themselves, and in turn, generate product for an industry. Lace design and craft became expeditious in growth from Munster outward, and is celebrated for its lace to this day.

Brenan was offered the position of headmaster of the Dublin Metropolitan School of Arts, which he promptly took up in 1889. The DMSA was the hub of the fine arts in Ireland at the time, and was the birthplace of many crucial figures in Irish art, and still is to this day under the name "National College of Art and Design".

In the fifteen years serving the DMSA as headmaster, Brenan was largely responsible for shifting the focus of the school's teaching methods away from being centered on fine arts education and theory for single, practical application, to implementing craft design classes for industry use.

These classes, like the ones he offered to the convents, followed the ideals of the South Kensington teaching style which Brenan so admired - fostering a sense of practical application of the skills learned to train future artisans in lace-making, metalwork, sculpting, etc.

In the twilight of his role as headmaster, Brenan remained interested in good lace design, passing published comment on the product coming from the Munster region, and travelling around Europe to learn educational techniques to be applied to his domain. James Brenan retired from the DMCA in 1904 having left a deep impression on the artisinal industries of Ireland and the promotion of practical applications of art design in the top art schools in the country.

== Legacy ==
It is said that the preliminary classes of lace making and courses for lace design established by Brenan at the Crawford Municipal School of Art, led to the national awareness of lace making from 1886 to 1914, "It was not until the promotional works of James Brenan in Cork and Dublin that design for lace became significant". His continuous promotion was the reason how "the new crafts were introduced in Dublin in the early years of the twentieth century".

In 2009 his 'Morning Prayer, Cottage Interior, County Cork, 1901' was sold for 9,500.

== Works in collections ==
- Portrait of the Artist's Brother (1855), Crawford Art Gallery, Cork, Ireland
- News from America (1875), Crawford Art Gallery, Cork, Ireland
- Words of Counsel (1876), Crawford Art Gallery, Cork, Ireland
- The Finishing Touch (1876), Ireland's Great Hunger Museum, Hamden, Connecticut, United States
- Committee of Inspection (1877), Crawford Art Gallery, Cork, Ireland
- Patchwork (1891), Crawford Art Gallery, Cork, Ireland
