= William Horatio Crawford =

William Horatio Crawford (1815–1888) was an Irish brewer and philanthropist. He was both a book collector and art collector, and contributed to the art school at the Cork School of Design, which became known as the Crawford School of Art in 1885. Much of the Crawford art collection is now held in the Crawford Art Gallery in Cork city.

== Biography ==
=== Early life ===
William Horatio Crawford was the first-born son of William Crawford (d. 1840), brewer, and Dulcibella Crawford (née Morris) of Lakelands House, Blackrock, Cork. The family was originally from County Down, related to the Crawfords of Crawfordsburn, and to William Sharman Crawford. William Crawford senior was joint owner of the Beamish and Crawford brewing company, founded by his grandfather; the firm paid one-eighth of the total rates in Cork City in 1834, and employed hundreds of men. In addition to other business interests, William Crawford senior was a philanthropist and helped fund the Cork School of Art and the Cork Savings Bank.

William Horatio Crawford entered Trinity College Dublin (TCD) on 1 July 1833, graduated BA in 1837, and entered King's Inns the same year.

=== Career and philanthropy ===
For much of his life, William Horatio Crawford was associated with the family firm, which he and his partner Richard P. Beamish controlled from the 1850s. They replaced the plant and modernised the buildings at great cost, and also invested in property in the city.

He reputedly, however, had "little interest in the brewing business" and was a "sleeping partner" in the brewery. Crawford used the "vast wealth and income from the brewery" to contribute to the intellectual and cultural institutions of Cork, as well as for donations to the Protestant cathedral and to the Women and Children's Hospital, and for private charity.

Crawford was friendly with William K. Sullivan, president of Queen's College Cork (now University College Cork), and was a benefactor to the college. He gave £1,000 to buy instruments for the astronomical observatory named after him (the Crawford Observatory); provided £2,750 to help build glasshouses for the botanic garden; and in 1881 gave £1,000 to help found a hall of residence for Church of Ireland students. He also furnished its rooms, and a short time later settled debts of over £3,000 which the college had been unable to repay to the board of works and banks. In 1884, Sullivan claimed that Crawford planned further large building projects for the college, but that uncertainty over the future of the college's non-denominational status was preventing him from implementing them; a sum of £30,000 to build accommodation was said to have been promised, but subsequently withheld. Between 1876 and 1880, he donated a valuable collection of books to the college library, which still bears his name. His own library was sold for £21,254 in 1891, more than any Irish collection sold previously; it contained many rare volumes and manuscripts.

He was also an art collector, and gave large amounts of money in 1884 to enable the existing art school to be more than doubled in size. The school buildings were renamed as the Crawford School of Art and opened (April 1885) by the prince of Wales. Crawford, however, was not present. It became the Crawford Municipal Art Gallery in 1979. Though virtually nothing remains of Crawford's garden at Lakelands, at its height it employed thirty workers, produced new hybrids of subtropical plants, largely stocked the botanic houses at the college, and in his garden Magnolia campbellii, a tree otherwise native to the Himalayas, "flowered for the first time in Britain or Ireland". He was a supporter of Cork Agricultural Society and of the Munster Dairy School (serving on the General Committee of the Munster Agricultural Society).

Crawford was unmarried; his sudden death on the night of 18/19 October 1888 at his home in Cork was mourned, and his public funeral to Brooklodge graveyard was attended by hundreds of mourners, including all his employees. His estate was valued at £328,226. 19s. 9d., and administration was granted to his uncle. Following his death in 1888, Lakelands house, which he inherited from his father, was demolished.

Collections of materials belonging to Crawford are possessed by the British Museum and the University of Leeds.
