= Elfordstown Earthstation =

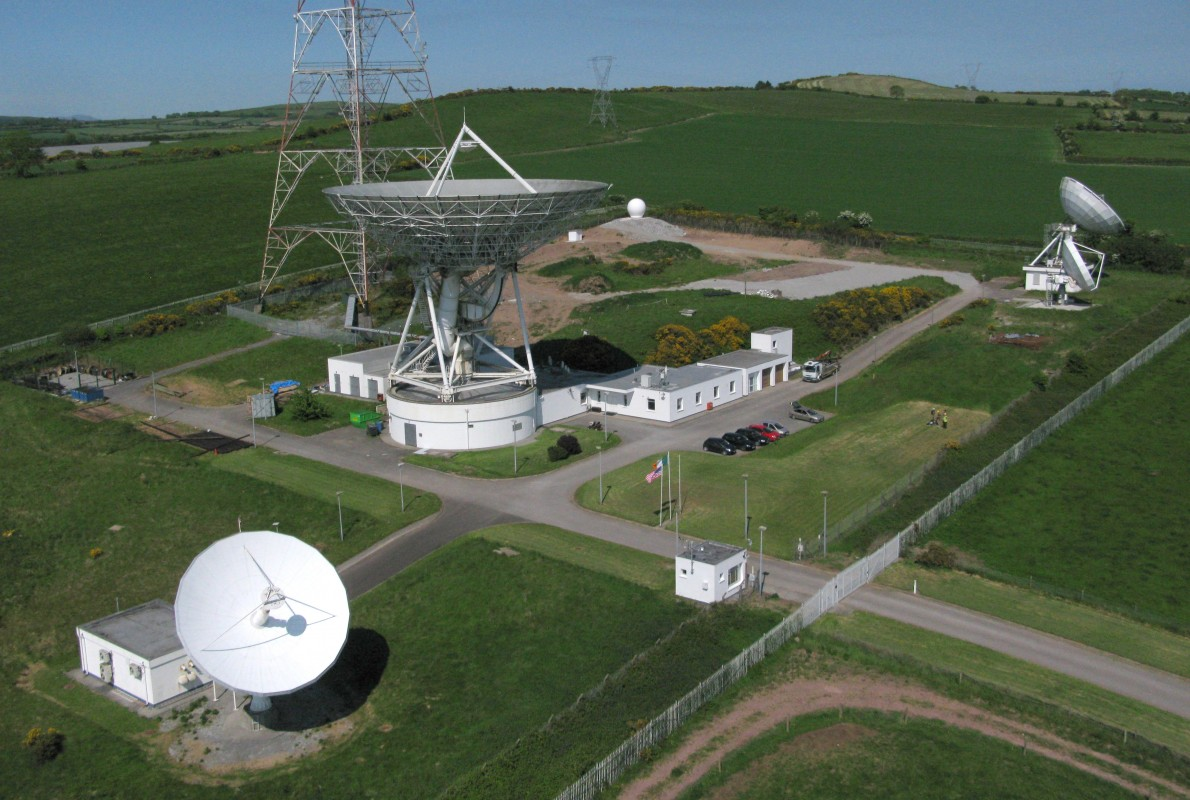
- Elfordstown Earthstation in 2013
- Organization: National Space Centre Ltd.
- Location: Midleton, County Cork
- Coordinates: 51°57′13″N 8°10′32″W
- Established: 1984
- Website: nationalspacecentre.eu

Elfordstown Earthstation is a ground station located near Midleton, County Cork, in the south of Ireland. It is operated by the National Space Centre Ltd and is Ireland's only and Europe's most western teleport.

== History ==
The Elfordstown site was originally commissioned by Telecom Éireann in association with Eutelsat and came into service in 1984, with the purpose of broadcasting voice, data and television services across Europe and between the United States and the continent. However, with the laying of transatlantic fibre cables, starting with PTAT-1 in 1989, the 32m antenna had become redundant by 1997 and was left idle for a number of years.

After several years unused, National Space Centre Ltd. took over the Elfordstown facility in 2010, installing a number of new satellite dishes and implementing a number of commercial and research based projects. The new complex was completed in April 2013.

== Location ==
Elfordstown Earthstation is located about 5 km north of Midleton and can be reached via a 3 km private road. The area is bounded by a 2.5m fence and can only be visited after registration. The facility consists of the main building with staff offices and rooms for research and development activities. A second, smaller building contains the generators for emergency power supplies as well as some more small buildings on the area for antenna purposes. The site with a size of 30,000 square meters is dominated by the 32m diameter C band antenna, which is currently not in operation. With the new 9.1m Ka band antenna built in 2011, it currently operates five antennas from 3.7m to 13.1m and many smaller dishes. The antennas are capable of communication in the C-, Ku-, Ka-, and S band. A 121.3-metre-tall free-standing lattice tower on the area of Elfordstown Earthstation is used for radio relay links to and from the facility.

== Current operations ==
National Space Centre Ltd uses Elfordstown Earthstation to operate on a number of levels, working closely with both private companies and governmental and bodies. Especially ground station operations and Earth observation with every type of satellite (low Earth orbit, medium Earth orbit and geosynchronous orbit) and secure data server hosting services are provided.

== Projects ==
National Space Centre possesses a Research and Development department, that partakes in numerous Irish, European and International research-based projects. Many of these projects are run through well-known bodies including the European Space Agency.
