= Henry Jones Thaddeus =

Irish painter (1859–1929)

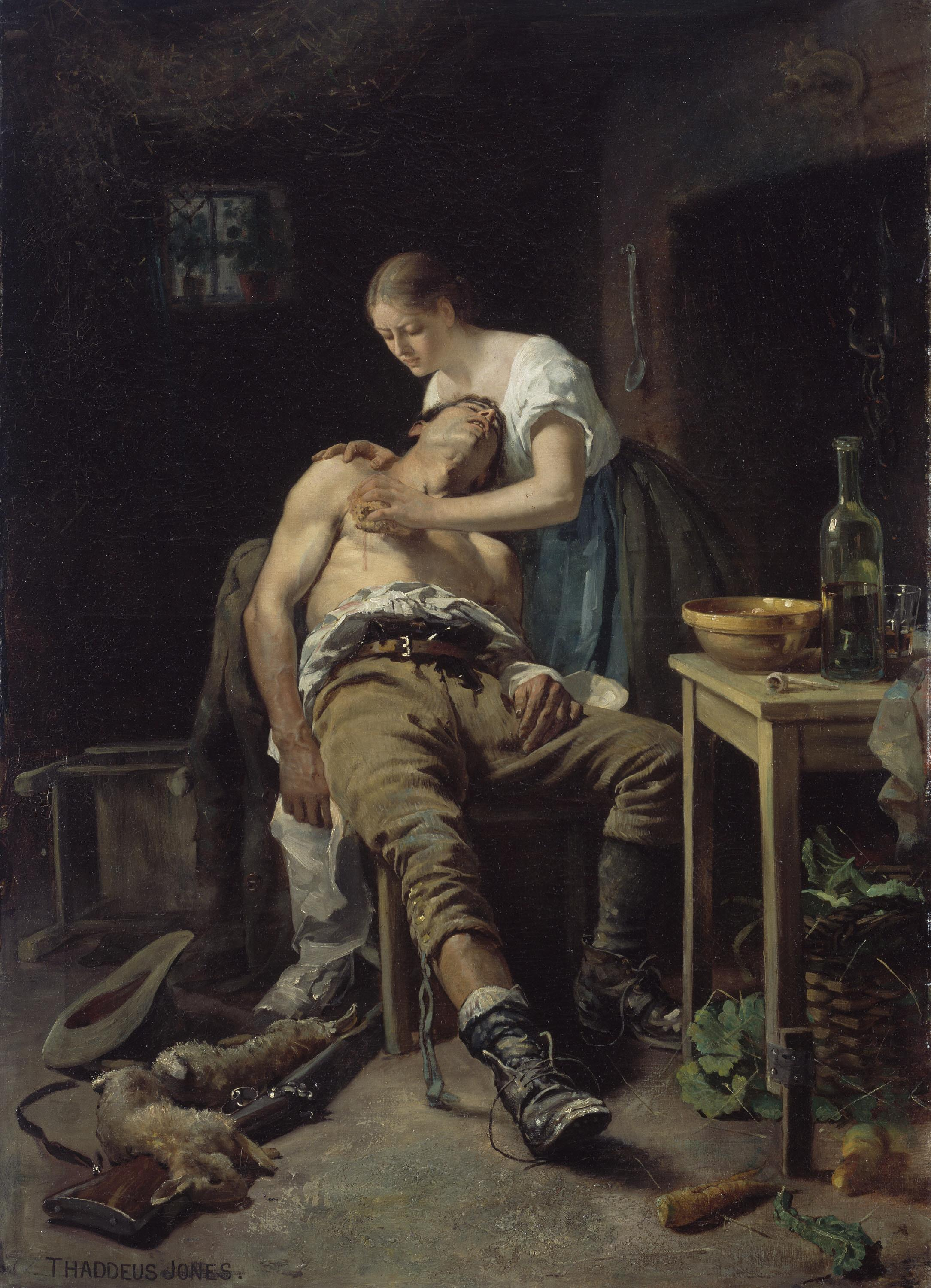
- Le retour du braconnier ("The Wounded Poacher"), painting by Henry Jones Thaddeus, 1881; now in National Gallery of Ireland
- Born: Henry Thaddeus Jones; 1859; Cork, Ireland
- Died: 1929 (aged 69–70); Ryde, Isle of Wight
- Education: Cork School of Art; London; Académie Julian, Paris
- Known for: Painter
- Movement: Orientalist; realist; Impressionist

Henry Jones Thaddeus (1859–1929) was a realist and portrait painter born and trained in County Cork, Ireland.

== Life and career ==
Born Henry Thaddeus Jones in 1859, he entered the Cork School of Art when he was ten years old. There he studied under the genre painter James Brenan. Thaddeus won the Taylor Prize in 1878 enabling him to go to London, and then again in 1879 enabling him to continue his studies in Paris at the Académie Julian. His first major painting, Le Retour du Braconnier (illustration, right), was hung "on the line" (at eye-level) at the Paris Salon of 1881.

He received commissions to paint portraits, among them two papal portrait commissions (for Pope Pius X), and became a Fellow of the Royal Geographical Society. He received several other portrait commissions.

In the 1880s, Thaddeus travelled to Algeria where he explored Orientalist painting.

His autobiography, titled Recollections of a Court Painter, was written during his retirement in California and published in 1912.

In his latter years he settled in the Isle of Wight, and died there at Ryde, on 1 May 1929.

== See also ==
- List of Orientalist artists
