= William Edward Gumbleton =

Irish horticulturist (1840–1911)

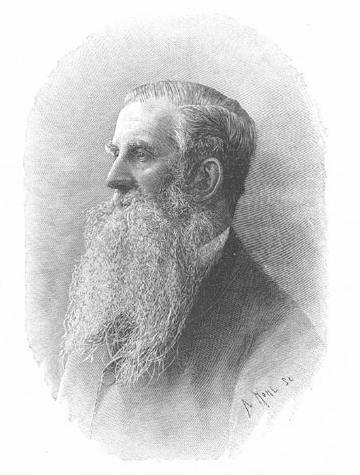
- Portrait of William Edward Gumbleton published in William Robinson (editor), The garden. An illustrated weekly journal of horticulture in all its branches, volume 55, London, 1899.
- Born: March 2, 1840; County Cork, Ireland
- Died: April 4, 1911 (aged 71)

William Edward Gumbleton (2 March 1840 – 4 April 1911) was an Irish horticulturist with at least one species (Arctotis gumbletonii) and two cultivars named after him.

He was the elder of the two sons of Rev. George Gumbleton, an Anglican clergyman, and Frances Anne (née Penrose). The Gumbleton family had lived in Ireland for several generations and Rev. George Gumbleton was vicar of Affane, County Cork. William Edward Gumbleton was educated at Brasenose College, Oxford, where he matriculated 8 June 1858, but seems to have left the university before graduating, as there is no record of his being awarded a degree.

As a young man, he travelled in Europe with his mother and studied languages, art and music, before settling at Belgrove, County Cork, an estate owned by his family and situated on Great Island in Cork Harbour. There, he devoted himself to horticulture, specialising in the growing of rare and newly introduced plants, particularly the species and cultivars of the Compositae such as Dahlia, Gnaphalium, Arctotis and Olearia.

Gumbleton was highly opinionated and quite intolerant of other people and of plants which he considered 'inferior'. There are examples of cases where, during visits to other people's gardens, he destroyed inferior specimens of plants, sometimes with his umbrella.

The species Arctotis gumbletonii was named after him by J.D. Hooker, "in tardy recognition of Mr. Gumbleton's services as a raiser and flowerer of many fine new plants". He also had two cultivars named after him: Kniphofia 'W.E. Gumbleton' and Azalea'W.E. Gumbleton'.

He built up a comprehensive collection of botanical books which he bequeathed to the Irish National Botanic Gardens, Glasnevin.
