= List of artists from Northern Ireland =

This is a list of notable artists born in Northern Ireland.

== A ==
- Kiran Acharya (1983–)
- Arthur Armstrong (1924–1996)
- Array Collective (active 2016–present) –Northern Irish collective of artists and activists who won the 2021 Turner Prize

== B ==
- James Bingham (1925–2009)
- Basil Blackshaw (1932–2016)
- Bogside Artists
- Alicia Boyle (1908–1997)
- Terry Bradley (1965–)
- Muriel Brandt (1909–1981)
- Deborah Brown (1927– )
- John Byrne

== C ==
- Joseph W. Carey (1859–1937)
- Thomas Carr (1909–1999)
- W. H. Conn (1895–1973)
- William Conor (1881–1968)
- William A. Coulter (1849–1936)
- James Humbert Craig (1877–1944)

== D ==
- Colin Davidson (1968– )
- Gerard Dillon (1916–1971)
- Willie Doherty (1959– )
- Keith Drury (artist) (1964– )
- Rita Duffy (1959– )

== E ==
- Brendan Ellis (1951– )

== F ==
- T P Flanagan (1929–2011)
- Hugh Frazer (1795–1865)
- Rowel Friers (1920–1998)

== G ==
- William St. John Glenn "Bill Glenn" (1904–1974)
- William Crampton Gore (1871–1946)

== H ==
- Siobhán Hapaska (1963– )
- Sarah Cecilia Harrison (1863–1941)
- Maurice Harron (1946– )
- Jeremy Henderson (1952–2009)
- Olive Henry (1902–1989)
- Paul Henry (1876–1958)
- Martin Heron (1965– )
- Seán Hillen (1961– )
- Mercy Hunter (1910–1989)

== J ==
- Oliver Jeffers (1977– )
- Patrick J. Jones Sci-fi and fantasy artist

== K ==
- John Kindness (1951– )

== L ==
- Charles Lamb (1893–1964)
- John Lavery (1856–1941)
- John Long (1964– )
- John Luke (1906–1975)

== M ==
- Gladys Maccabe (1918–2018)
- George MacCann (1909–1967)
- Kathleen Isabella Mackie (1899–1996)
- Elizabeth Magill (1959– )
- Cecil Maguire (1930–2020)
- Jim Manley (1934– )
- Padraig Marrinan (1906–1973)
- Violet McAdoo (1896–1961)
- Charles McAuley (1910–1999)
- Samuel McCloy (1831–1904)
- Norah McGuinness (1901–1980)
- Frank McKelvey (1895–1974)
- Cherith McKinstry (1928–2004)
- F. E. McWilliam (1909–1989)
- Colin Middleton (1910–1983)
- Crawford Mitchell (1908–1976)
- George C Morrison (1915–1993)
- Albert Morrow (1863–1927)
- George Morrow (1869–1955)
- Jack Morrow (1872–1926)
- Carolyn Mulholland (1944– )

== N ==
- Paul Nietsche (1885–1950)

== O ==
- Daniel O'Neill (1920–1974)
- Dennis H. Osborne (1919–2016)
- Jean Osborne (1926–1965)

== P ==
- Charles Peers (1875–1944)
- Raymond Piper (1923–2007)
- Rosamond Praeger (1867–1954)
- Graeme Purdy (born 1971)

== R ==
- Clifford Rainey (1948– )
- Maria D. Robinson (1840–1920)
- Markey Robinson (1918–1999)
- George William Russell (1867–1935)

== S ==
- William Scott (1913–1989)
- Paul Seawright (1965– )
- Elizabeth Shaw (1920–1992)
- Neil Shawcross (1940– )
- Oliver Sheppard (1865–1941)
- James Sleator (1889–1950)
- Hamilton Sloan (1945– )
- Victor Sloan MBE (1945– )
- Andre Stitt (1958– )

== T ==
- Romeo Toogood (1902–1966)

== W ==
- James Ward (1851–1924)
- Ross Wilson (1958– )
- Donovan Wylie (1971– )
- Maurice Canning Wilks (1910–1984)

== Y ==
- John Butler Yeats (1839–1922)
