= Jean Osborne =

Northern Irish artist (1926–1965)

- Born: 21 February 1926; Larne, County Antrim
- Died: 9 July 1965 (aged 39); Lisburn, County Antrim
- Education: Camberwell School of Arts & Crafts
- Alma mater: Belfast School of Art
- Known for: Landscapes & portraits
- Style: Abstract
- Spouse: Dennis H Osborne
- Website: https://www.dhosborneartist.com/

Jean Osborne (née Meikle; 21 February 1926 – 9 July 1965) was an artist from Northern Ireland who worked primarily in oils and watercolours.

== Early life ==
Osborne was born in the port of Larne, County Antrim, the daughter of William Meikle who was a fitter at Harland and Wolff.

Osborne was interested in art from a young age and at the age of twenty her talent was recognised by Paul Nietsche in Belfast. She was awarded a scholarship from the Ministry of Education to further her studies. Before moving to London in 1947 she worked for a short period as a seamstress. Osborne enrolled in evening classes at Camberwell School of Arts and Crafts where she was to attain an Intermediate Certificate in Arts and Crafts in 1950 under the influence of John Minton. Osborne then returned to Belfast where she completed her National Diploma in Art and Design.

== Career ==
Shortly after Osborne arrived in London in 1947 she met fellow artist Dennis H Osborne at a life drawing class. The couple married in February 1948 a few months after their first meeting. At the time, Jean Osborne was living in abject poverty but things did not immediately improve with marriage as her husband Dennis described a particularly bleak Christmas Eve in Belfast in the early 1950s:

"...when everybody was getting ready to have a good time, I didn't have a bean. [...] I went into a pub and said, 'Anybody want to buy a painting? Ten Quid.' I was lucky to sell it. That was our Christmas day."

In her graduation year Osborne was selected to show alongside other leading Ulster artists including Kathleen Bridle, John Luke, Dan O'Neill, and Deborah Brown, at the exhibition of Contemporary Ulster Art at the Belfast Museum and Art Gallery, which formed part of the Festival of Britain. Osborne spent the summer of 1951 with her husband in County Donegal, where they were guests of the millionaire-philanthropist and art-collector Henry Plumer McIlhenny, staying in the gatelodge of his summer home at Glenveagh Castle.

The following year Osborne contributed two paintings to the London Group's annual exhibition in the New Burlington Galleries, where she exhibited alongside her old mentor John Minton, Victor Pasmore and Claude Rogers, all founders of the Euston Road School, Bloomsbury Group veterans Duncan Grant and Vanessa Bell, the sculptors Lynn Chadwick and a young Elizabeth Frink, Patrick Heron and fellow Ulster painter William Scott. Before departing the UK for Canada in the autumn of 1953, the young artist participated in exhibitions with the New English Art Club, the Young Contemporaries, and at the Artists' International Association. On 20 November 1953 Osborne sailed from Cobh, County Cork on the TSS Olympia to Canada where she was reunited with her husband who had emigrated 6 months earlier. She arrived in Niagara Falls eight days after her departure.

In January 1955 Osborne showed works in a joint exhibition with her husband and David Partridge at the Art Gallery, St Catharine’s Public Library.

To mark the first anniversary of her arrival in Canada, Osborne presented two paintings in the Art Gallery of Hamilton's 6th Annual Winter Exhibition, an oil entitled The Harmonica Player and a portrait of her closest friend, the poet and playwright Barbara Hunter. Osborne worked prolifically and exhibited extensively across Canada in the following years, showing a further four works in subsequent Winter Exhibitions at the Art Gallery of Hamilton, in 1957, 1958 and again in 1960.

Osborne joined the Colour and Form Society in 1955. She exhibited at their annual juried exhibitions at Hart House, Toronto, in 1956 and 1957. In 1957 Osborne also showed works in the Ontario Society of Artists 85th Annual Exhibition, and returned to the Art Gallery of Hamilton in a joint exhibition with Dennis, and Walter Robert Hickling, a well-known composer, poet, and artist that autumn.

In 1958 Osborne and her husband presented a joint exhibition at the Thielsen Gallery, a commercial gallery in London, Ontario. To conclude her six year stay in St. Catharine's, Osborne displayed her work at the 4th Annual Winnipeg Art Show, and at the 33rd Annual Exhibition of the Canadian Society of Painters in Watercolour. Osborne's ailing health persuaded the young family to return to the United Kingdom in 1959.

Upon her return to the UK Osborne exhibited in the Third Exhibition of Flower Paintings hosted by the Royal Society of Painters in Watercolour at the Mall Galleries, London in 1960.

The Osborne's new residence was in Portadown, County Armagh, where Dennis had secured a teaching position at Portadown Technical College. When Dennis was appointed as Head of Art at Lisnagarvey High School in 1962 the couple purchased a house in Lisburn, next door to the artist and teacher Colin Middleton. The two families became closely acquainted. The Osbornes exhibited alongside Middleton at New Gallery Painters Exhibition in 1963, with further works from TP Flanagan, Crawford Mitchell, Thomas Carr, Cherith McKinstry, David Crone, and Wilfred Stewart.

== Death and legacy ==
Osborne died in Lisburn Hospital on 9 July 1965, due to the brain tumour which had forced her return to Ulster six years before. She was 39 years old. Osborne was survived by her husband Dennis and her daughter, Moya.

In an essay entitled Painting and Sculpture, Kenneth Jamison, Director of the Arts Council of Northern Ireland, wrote that Osborne and her husband had "both made significant contributions [to art in Ulster] during the fifties and early sixties". However, Dennis often insisted that Jean was the more accomplished of the two artists.

Osborne was represented as an 'invited artist' in the Royal Ulster Academy of Arts 86th Annual Exhibition in the autumn of 1965 where she showed two paintings posthumously, including a self-portrait entitled Growth depicting her tumour.

In 1967 the Arts Council of Northern Ireland paid tribute to her life and works in a retrospective memorial exhibition at the New Gallery, Belfast. Her husband contributed an introduction to the accompanying catalogue.

The Ulster Society of Women Artists also paid tribute to her life with her inclusion in the annual show in November 1967 at Dublin's Municipal Gallery.

In review of Osborne's posthumous retrospective at the New Gallery A W Bowyer commented:

"There is more than enough to show how much was lost to us through the early death of this gifted artist."

Osborne's works are held in many private collections, in addition to public collections such as the Ulster Museum and the Armagh County Museum.

== Personal life ==
Osborne gave birth to a daughter in 1957.
