= Sheelagh Flanagan =

Northern Irish actress (1925–2018)

- Born: Sheelagh Mabel Garvan; 25 December 1925; Belfast, Northern Ireland
- Died: 3 May 2018 (aged 92); Belfast, Northern Ireland
- Resting place: Convent Cemetery, Enniskillen
- Occupation(s): Actress, costume designer, gallery owner, peace activist
- Spouse: T. P. Flanagan

Sheelagh Flanagan (25 December 1925 – 3 May 2018) was a Northern Irish actress, costume designer, artist's agent, gallery owner and peace activist.

== Early life ==
Sheelagh Mabel Garvan was born in Belfast on Christmas Day 1925, the daughter of a local shopkeeper. She left school at the age of fourteen and joined the civil service where she was later promoted to become private secretary to Northern Ireland's Attorney General. Her interest in the performing arts led her to join the Arts Theatre in Belfast. Following an encounter with the theatre director Mary O'Malley, Garvan joined the Lyric Players where she was to meet her future husband who designed sets. In 1959, Garvan married the artist Terence Flanagan. Garvan came from a Unionist family, but converted to Roman Catholicism upon her marriage.

== Career ==
Flanagan was a skilled dressmaker from a young age and once declined a dressmaking scholarship in London, but after her marriage she became involved in the production of sets and costumes at the Lyric Theatre. Flanagan's early career and outlook was influenced by her neighbours John and Ruby Hewitt, when they lived at Mount Charles, off Botanic Avenue in Belfast. She was influenced by the couples' austere living and their socialist outlook.

Flanagan retired from acting in the early 1960s due to the demands of family life. Her interest in the performing arts did not wane and in 1973 she made a return to the theatre by designing costumes for Interplay, a company who brought educational theatre into schools and communities.

Flanagan organised an exhibition to raise funds for victims of civil disturbances in Belfast in the autumn of 1969. The exhibition at Queen's University consisted of donated works from thirty artists including her husband, Gerard Dillon, William Scott and Graham Gingles, Mercy Hunter, Carolyn Mulholland and Cherith McKinstry. In 1974, she was appointed office administrator for the community group Peace Point, founded by the Peace People in conjunction with the Corrymeela Community. Peace Point organised educational programmes aimed at breaking down sectarian barriers and uniting the many peace groups across Northern Ireland. Flanagan was a co-founder and trustee of the Northern Ireland Voluntary Trust when they formed in 1979.

Flanagan established the Shambles Gallery in Hillsborough, County Down, in 1971. Her husband, Patric Stevenson, who at the time was President of the Royal Ulster Academy, and the Lisburn industrialist Robert Wilson served as directors. The inaugural exhibition showed the works of F. E. McWilliam, William Scott, George Campbell, Gerard Dillon, Norah McGuinness and Colin Middleton amongst a dozen artists. Flanagan became a promoter of her husband's work, in addition to acting as an agent for other Ulster artists including F E McWilliam. The gallery was closed in 1973 due to civil unrest and reopened in 1985. F. E. McWilliam showed a bronze of Sheelagh Flanagan at the Royal Ulster Academy of Arts annual exhibition of 1978.

In the mid-1980s, Flanagan became the agent for the sculptor Deborah Brown whose animal sculpture's were exhibited for the first time at Flanagan's Shambles Gallery in 1989.

Flanagan sat on the board of the Irish National Ballet in 1982. She was close friends with many of Ulster's literary, dramatic and visual artists of the fifties and sixties, including John Hewitt, Seamus Heaney and Jimmy Ellis. In 1987, Flanagan held a commemorative exhibition, A Poet's Pictures, for John Hewitt consisting of pictures collected by the late Hewitt and his wife. The accompanying catalogue contained tributes from artists and poets.

== Death and legacy ==
Sheelagh Flanagan died in Belfast on 3 May 2018.
