= Mercy Hunter =

Northern Irish artist (1910–1989)

Mercy Hunter HRUA, PPRUA, ARCA, MBE
- Born: Martha Saie Kathleen Hunter; 22 January 1910; Belfast, Ireland
- Died: July 20, 1989 (aged 79); Dungannon, County Tyrone, Northern Ireland
- Education: Belfast School of Art
- Alma mater: Royal College of Art London
- Spouse: George Galway MacCann

Mercy Hunter HRUA PPRUA ARCA MBE (22 January 1910 – 20 July 1989) was a Northern Irish artist, calligrapher and teacher. Hunter was a founding member of the Ulster Society of Women Artists, where she was later to become president and she was also a past president of the Royal Ulster Academy of Arts.

== Early life ==
Mercy Hunter was born in Belfast on 22 January 1910, one of five children of William Hunter, a Presbyterian minister, and his Russian-born wife Alice Beyer. Hunter was christened Martha Saie Kathleen, but was always known as Mercy. Her parents served as missionaries in China, with Hunter travelling to Manchuria at the age of four.

She spent her childhood there, leaving to attend secondary school in Toronto, Canada, and at Belfast Royal Academy. She went on to attend Belfast College of Art from 1927 to 1929, and won a scholarship to the Royal College of Art in London from 1930 to 1933 where she studied under the calligrapher Edward Johnston.

Whilst in London she befriended numerous Ulster artists, including William Scott, F. E. McWilliam, Crawford Mitchell, and her future husband, the sculptor George MacCann. Hunter returned to Belfast in 1937, and married MacCann the following year.

== Artistic career ==
Hunter spent the majority of her career as an art teacher in a number of grammar schools in Northern Ireland such as Dungannon High School for Girls, County Tyrone, Banbridge Academy, County Down, and Armagh High School. She became the head of art at Victoria College, Belfast in 1947, where she remained until her retirement in 1970.

In the spring of 1944 Hunter showed portraits in pencil and watercolour, as well as some landscapes, alongside her brother at Pollock's Gallery in Belfast. Hunter also began a life-long relationship with the Ulster Academy of Arts in 1944 when she participated in their annual exhibition for the first time, by showing three portraits. She was to exhibit with their successor organisation, the Royal Ulster Academy of Arts throughout her life, and missed only three annual exhibitions in the thirty years between 1950 and 1980. Hunter served as President of the RUA from 1976-1977, having previously been honoured by her appointment as Associate of the RUA in 1948 and as an Academician in 1967. She was bestowed with an MBE in 1970 for her services to art and education.

Hunter is best known for her calligraphy, illuminated addresses, and a small number of illustrated books, including her husband's 1942 book Sparrows Round my Brow. She also created costume designs for the local theatres and for Patricia Mulholland's Irish ballet company. Hunter designed all the costumes for the Grand Opera Society of Northern Ireland's 1958 production of Carmen, when it was said that she had already created 200 designs for production up until this date.

In 1965 Hunter joined twelve Ulster artists including Alice Berger Hammerschlag, Basil Blackshaw, Colin Middleton, Romeo Toogood, and Olive Henry in an exhibition of diverse landscape paintings at the Arts Council Of Northern Ireland Gallery. Hunter donated a picture to an exhibition to raise funds for victims of civil disturbances in Belfast in the autumn of 1969. The exhibition at Queen's University was organised by Sheelagh Flanagan and showed the work of T P Flanagan, William Scott, F. E. McWilliam, Deborah Brown, Cherith McKinstry, and Carolyn Mulholland as well as more than twenty others.

Hunter received an honorary Master's degree from Queen's University Belfast in 1975 at the same time as her long-term collaborator Patricia Mulholland. The wife of the Northern Irish Secretary of State Colleen Rees was the curator of a personal selection of works from Ulster Artists hosted at the Leeds Playhouse Gallery in 1976. Hunter's work was among 49 works from various artists where she displayed alongside Raymond Piper, Carolyn Mulholland, Joe McWilliams, TP Flanagan, Tom Carr and many others.

Hunter was amongst the founding members, and a past president of the Ulster Society of Women Artists, and exhibited frequently with the Ulster Watercolour Society. Owing to her numerous lectures and broadcasts, Hunter was a well known figure to the Northern Irish public. After her retirement Hunter continued to teach art history at Rupert Stanley College, continued to design costumes and she also became a trustee of the Ulster Museum.

Hunter showed a number of works including Main Gate: the Citadel Gozo and Church at Jordina Halsa Gozo, with Joy Clements, George C Morrison, Wilfred J Haughton, Robin McCully and Tom Kerr at the Malone Gallery, Belfast in 1982.

== Death and legacy ==
Hunter died on 20 July 1989, in hospital in Dungannon. The Ulster History Circle unveiled a plaque to Hunter on 3 November 2010, at her former address of 23 Botanic Avenue, Belfast, where she had lived for many years from 1949 until forced to move when a car-bomb destroyed the premises in September 1972.

Hunter's works are held by many public and private collections including the Ulster Museum, Down County Museum and Grand Opera House, Belfast.
