= Carolyn Mulholland =

Irish sculptor and artist

Carolyn Mulholland RHA, RUA
- Born: 1944 (age 81–82); Lurgan, County Armagh, Northern Ireland
- Education: Belfast College of Art
- Known for: sculpture
- Elected: Aosdana

Carolyn Mulholland RHA, RUA (born 1944) is an Irish sculptor.

== Life ==
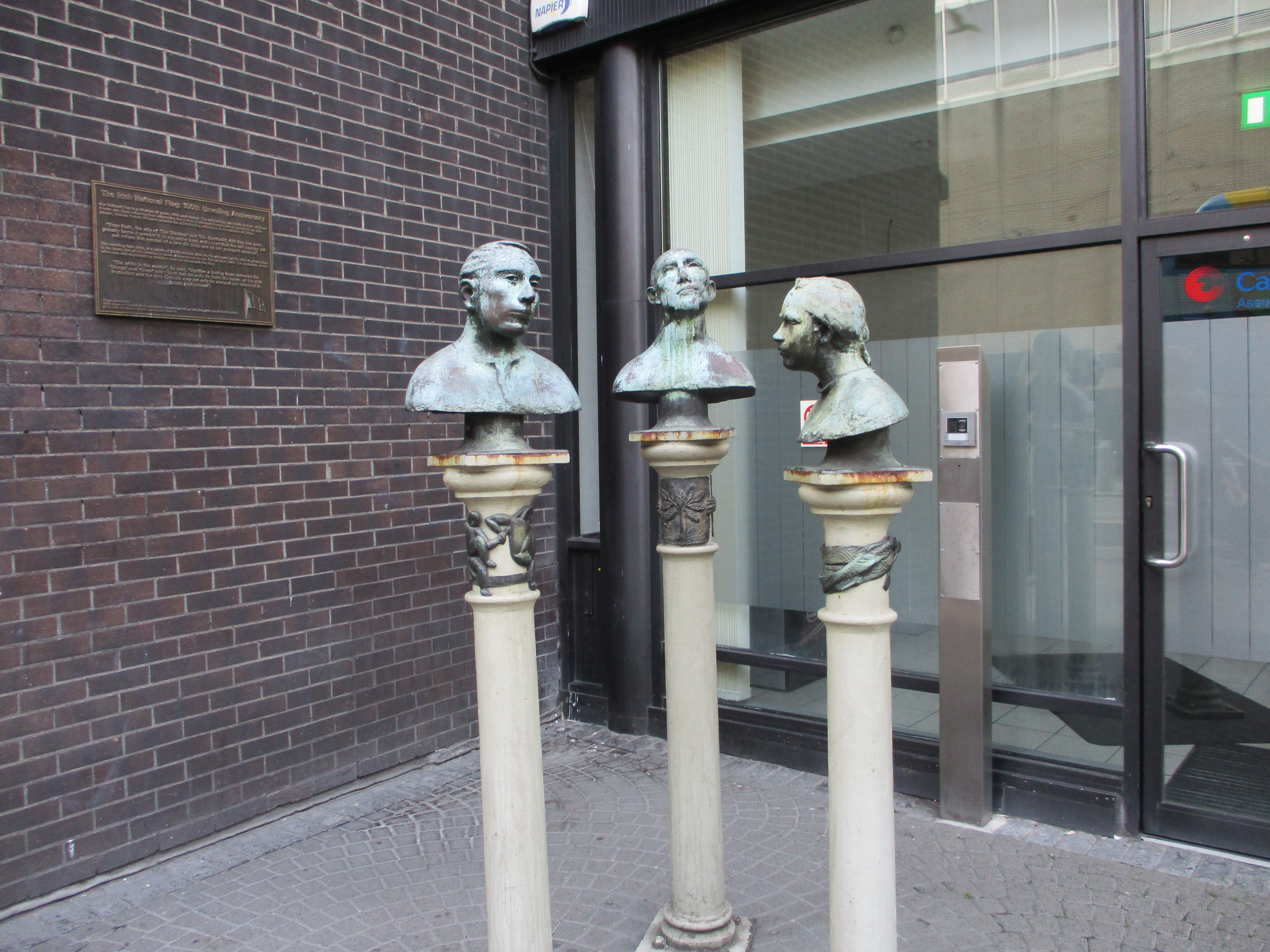
Talking Heads, Abbey Street, Dublin

Carolyn Mulholland was born in 1944 in Lurgan, County Armagh. She attended the Belfast College of Art, and in 1965 was awarded the Ulster Arts Club prize for sculpture. A close friend of Seamus Heaney, Mulholland sculpted a portrait bust of Heaney while a student in the 1960s.

Mulholland donated a picture to an exhibition to raise funds for victims of civil disturbances in Belfast in the autumn of 1969. The exhibition at Queen's University was organised by Sheelagh Flanagan and showed works by William Scott, Graham Gingles, F E McWilliam, Deborah Brown, Cherith McKinstry, and Mercy Hunter, as well as more than twenty others. The wife of the Northern Irish Secretary of State Colleen Rees was the curator of a personal selection of works from Ulster Artists hosted at the Leeds Playhouse Gallery in 1976. Mulholland's work was among 49 artworks from various artists where she was displayed alongside TP Flanagan, Joe McWilliams, Mercy Hunter, Tom Carr and many others.

Much of Mulholland's sculpture depicts moving abstract figures. In 1973 she was awarded the Royal Ulster Academy Silver Medal Award. In 1974 Mulholland was elected Associate of the Royal Ulster Academy of Arts alongside Renée Bickerstaff and Francis Neill. She was elected a member of Aosdána in 1990. She has been exhibited at the Pepper Canister Gallery in Dublin with Basil Blackshaw. In 1992 she won the Irish-American Cultural Institute's O'Malley Award. The Chester Beatty Library holds a portrait by Mulholland of Beatty from 1996, and the Office of Public Works holds her portrait of President Mary McAleese from 2003.

Mulholland has been commissioned to make a number of large and public sculptures, including for the famine memorial graveyard, Clones, County Monaghan in 1998, and in 2003 a bronze panel for the Customs House, Dublin. She has also been commissioned in Northern Ireland, by organisations such as the Arts Council of Northern Ireland. She created the Blitz Memorial for the Northern Ireland War Memorial museum in Belfast.

== Legacy ==
Carolyn Mulholland's work can be found in many private collections, and public institutions including the Ulster Museum, Armagh County Museum, Royal Ulster Academy of Arts Diploma Collection, and Queen's University, Belfast.

== Selected works ==
- Talking Heads, Abbey Street, Dublin (1990)
- Iris, Newman Building, University College Dublin (UCD) (1994)
- Group, a private commission of three eight-foot-tall bronze figures (2002)
- Man with Kite, a large bronze panel for the new Customs House, Dublin (2003)
- Narcissus, Newman Building, UCD (2009)
- Tremor, O'Brien Science Centre, UCD (2012)
