= Dennis H. Osborne =

British artist & teacher (1919–2016)

Dennis H. Osborne HRUA
- Born: 23 December 1919; Portsmouth, England
- Died: 10 May 2016 (aged 96); Newtownards, Ireland
- Education: Heatherley School of Fine Art
- Alma mater: Camberwell School of Arts & Crafts
- Known for: Landscapes & portraits
- Style: Figurative abstraction
- Spouse: Jean Osborne
- Website: https://www.dhosborneartist.com/

Dennis Henry Osborne HRUA (23 December 1919 – 10 May 2016) was a British artist and teacher who worked mainly in oil and watercolour. Osborne exhibited widely in Canada, Ireland and the UK. He was a follower of the Euston Road School and the Post-Impressionist Paul Cézanne. He was an Honorary Academician of the Royal Ulster Academy of Arts.

== Early life ==
Dennis Henry Osborne was born in Portsmouth on 23 December 1919. Osborne was the fourth of five children and the son of a naval submariner whom had served in two World Wars, Ernest Edward Osborne, and his wife Ada Annie Lacey.

He received a general education at the Kingsbury School in Middlesex before serving an apprenticeship with the London printers William Clowes & Sons Ltd. Osborne joined the Territorial Army at the age of twenty serving as a lorry driver for the Royal Artillery in France during World War Two. Gunner Osborne had to be evacuated from the beaches of Dunkirk in 1940. He almost drowned as he waded out to meet his rescuers. He was later re-deployed with the 1st Armoured Division in North Africa in 1941. In January 1942 Dennis was taken prisoner of war and transported to a prison camp in the Dolomites of northern Italy. Dennis and a friend escaped when the guards abandoned their posts after Italy's capitulation in July 1943. They spent six months on-the-run before being recaptured and transferred to a forced labour camp in Silesia, Poland, where they remained until their liberation by the American military in 1945.

== Education ==
Osborne spent his spare time in captivity drawing pictures for his fellow prisoners and guards, earning small privileges, and rekindling his childhood love of art. Osborne was demobbed in 1946 and received an ex-serviceman's bursary from London County Council. He used his bursary to attend classes at Heatherley School of Fine Art where he befriended the Canadian born painter James Le Jeune. Osborne continued his studies with a further four years at Camberwell School of Arts and Crafts, where he came under the influence of John Minton and Euston Road School painters Victor Pasmore, William Coldstream and WT Monnington. He graduated with an Intermediate Certificate in Arts & Crafts and a National Diploma in Art and Design in 1950.

In 1947 Osborne met a young Ulster woman, Jean Meikle, who was also a painter, a fellow student at Camberwell, and a former student of Paul Nietsche in Belfast. Osborne married Jean in February 1948, shortly after they had first met, and they soon became inseparable. In 1953 they emigrated to St.Catharine's, Ontario, where Jean gave birth to a daughter in 1957. They remained in Canada until 1959 when Jean's declining health forced the young family to return to the UK.

== Life and works ==
Osborne was a prolific artist who exhibited widely and embedded himself into the local art scene in each community that he lived. He exhibited in the first Young Contemporaries exhibition alongside a 17 year old Howard Hodgkin and Artists of Greater London in 1949, and also in the following year with the Art Students of Great Britain in the 1950 Young Contemporaries exhibition. Osborne showed with the New English Art Club in 1950, and at the Royal Academy of Arts in 1952. From 1953 until 1959 Osborne exhibited on the Canadian art circuit participating in the annual shows at the Art Gallery of Hamilton, Montreal Museum of Fine Arts, Winnipeg Art Gallery, and with the Ontario Society of Artists, the Canadian Society of Painters in Water colour and the Colour and Form Society. He was appointed President of the Colour and Form Society in 1957. The Art Gallery of Hamilton awarded Osborne a purchase prize at their 8th Annual Winter Exhibition in February 1957, for a portrait of his brother-in-law Jim. Osborne's Canadian sojourn included several two, and three-man exhibitions with his wife, and artists Walter Hickling and David Partridge. Shortly before he returned to the UK Dennis accepted an invitation to show at the Twentieth Biennial International Water Colour Exhibition at Brooklyn Museum of Art in 1959.

Osborne had a parallel career as an art teacher. He began teaching leisure classes in Dungloe, in the Rosses, County Donegal in 1951. In Donegal Dennis and Jean found accommodation in the gate lodge of Glenveagh Castle which was owned by American art collector and millionaire Henry Plumer McIlhenny. In Ontario Osborne delivered art classes at St. Catharine's Collegiate and Smithville High School, in addition to portraits and landscapes at Lakehead Area Art Association. Osborne and his family returned to the United Kingdom in 1959. His first employ was as Head of the Art Department at Portadown Technical College. In 1962 Osborne settled in Lisburn, County Antrim. The Osbornes bought a property in the town when Dennis became Head of Art and Design at Lisnagarvey Boys County Secondary School where he continued to teach until his retirement in 1983. The Osbornes moved into a house adjacent to established artist and fellow pedagogue Colin Middleton where they became friends. Osborne was later to show a portrait of Middleton at the RUA in 1965. Osborne continued to exhibit frequently throughout the 1960s when he held solo shows at the Council for the Encouragement of Music and Art (CEMA) gallery in 1962 and another at the Arts Council of Northern Ireland (ACNI) gallery in 1968.

Osborne cemented his place in the local arts community by exhibiting in the First Open Painting Exhibition at the Ulster Museum in 1962, and at the New Gallery Painters Exhibition in 1963 alongside Colin Middleton, Jean Osborne, Tom Carr and TP Flanagan. His works were shown in Dublin with the Irish Exhibition of Living Art of 1963, 1964 and 1965. He also began a fifty-year association with the Royal Ulster Academy who elected him an Associate Member in 1965 at the same time as Gladys MacCabe, James MacIntyre and George MacCann.

In 1965 his first wife Jean succumbed to the brain tumour which had prompted the family's return to Northern Ireland. The Arts Council of Northern Ireland honoured Jean Osborne's memory with a posthumous retrospective in the summer of 1967, to which Dennis Osborne contributed a biography by way of introduction to the works. Osborne later remarried a Lisburn woman named Maureen Wortley who was for a time a secretary at Lisnagarvey High School. Osborne continued to exhibit work throughout the 1970s in group shows at the Royal Ulster Academy – and at private galleries including the Tom Caldwell Gallery at Bradbury Place, Belfast.

In 1982 Dennis H Osborne was inducted into the newly opened National Self-Portrait Collection of Ireland when his 1970 Self-Portrait was displayed in the inaugural exhibition at the Kneafsey Gallery, University of Limerick. In his retirement Osborne resumed painting full-time and moved to Newtownards, County Down to be close to his daughter and her family. He held a studio on South Street in the Town for a number of years thereafter. In 1986 he bought a beachfront cottage in Portavogie, a place for which he had an affinity and one where he took much inspiration from the local environment. In 1988 he held his first solo exhibition in 20 years at the Arts Centre in Newtownards. He continued exhibiting in group shows, with the RUA, and the Royal Hibernian Academy and as part of the Queen's University Belfast International Arts Festival.

Osborne made no immediate reduction in output as he entered the 1990s and he his seventies. He had several two-man exhibitions in the 1990s, one at the Emer Gallery on Belfast's Great Victoria Street in 1993 with Maurice Henderson-Fry, and two in 1995, at the Ulster Arts Club Gallery with Michael Ginnett and with future president of the Royal Ulster Academy, Richard J Croft in an exhibition called The Spanish Connection at Croft's Studio Gallery in Dundrum. In the summer of 1998 Osborne held a solo exhibition in Dublin at Jorgensen Fine Art. Throughout the Nineties Osborne maintained his longstanding tradition of showing in the annual exhibitions of the Royal Ulster Academy.

As Osborne entered the new Millennium he celebrated his sixth decade of painting in a show at Dublin's Molesworth Gallery in 2001, Osborne's second solo exhibition in four years and also his last. His relationship with the Royal Ulster Academy was strengthened when he was elected an Honorary Member in 2002. A year later Osborne received the Blackstaff Press Award of £500 for an abstract oil painting of a linen sack at the 122nd Annual Exhibition. In 2008 Osborne showed with Bertie Higgins, Bernie Devlin, and Wendy Reeves in the Gillen Gallery on South Street, Newtownards, in what was to be his final exhibition.

== Death and legacy ==
Dennis Henry Osborne died at Movilla House Nursing Home on 10 May 2016. He was 96 years old. His second wife Maureen pre-deceased him by two years. Osborne is survived by his daughter, two grandchildren and two great-grandchildren.

In 2017 the Irish Linen Centre & Lisburn Museum hosted a major retrospective of Osborne's work which included more than 30 works gathered from public and private collections.

Osborne was a prolific artist who worked on an average of three pictures each week until the last ten years of his life. Osborne experimented with many styles of painting, but he was undoubtedly influenced by the Euston Road School which emphasized naturalism, simplicity of form and realism. He was also influenced by Paul Cézanne particularly in his use of colour as a means of constructing form. He painted landscapes and portraits in oil and watercolours. As his health declined Osborne concentrated on still lifes until he was no longer able to work. He is known to have completed at least four murals, one in Milford Parochial Hall, County Donegal in 1951, one for the Stewart & Hinan Corporation, one in the recreation room of John Pennachetti's, both in St Catharines, and another in a chiropractor's clinic in Welland, Ontario, in 1959.

Osborne had a great love of music and was particularly interested in Blues. He was also an accomplished guitar player.

In an essay entitled Painting and Sculpture, Kenneth Jamison, Director of the Arts Council of Northern Ireland, wrote that Osborne and his wife Jean had "both made significant contributions [to art in Ulster] during the fifties and early sixties". David Young echoed those sentiments when reviewing Osborne's posthumous exhibition in 2017 adding,

"Osborne is considered one of the most important, yet least known, artists to have painted in Northern Ireland."

Osborne's work can be found in many private, and public collections, including the Arts Council of Northern Ireland, Civil Service of Northern Ireland, the Bar of Northern Ireland, the Ulster Television Collection, Royal Ulster Academy of Arts Diploma Collection, the National Self-Portrait Collection of Ireland, the Irish Linen Centre & Lisburn Museum, and the Permanent Collection of the Art Gallery of Hamilton.

== Works cited ==
- MacKey, Brian (2017). Dennis H Osborne artist: an appreciation. Irish Linen Centre & Lisburn Museum, Lisburn.
