= George Galway MacCann =

Irish artist and broadcaster (1909–1967)

George Galway MacCann ARCA ARUA
- Born: 14 February 1909
- Died: 4 November 1967 (aged 58)
- Education: Belfast School of Art & Royal College of Art
- Alma mater: Royal College of Art
- Known for: Sculpture & painting
- Style: Abstract
- Spouse: Mercy Hunter

George Galway MacCann ARCA ARUA (14 February 1909 – 4 November 1967) was a Northern Irish abstract painter and Modernist sculptor, writer and broadcaster. MacCann was born in Belfast, the son of monumental sculptor David and his wife Elizabeth.

== Education ==
MacCann received a general education at Royal Belfast Academical Institution from 1920 to 1926 and studied sculpture at Belfast School of Art under Seamus Stoupe for three years thereafter. Upon concluding his studies at Belfast School of Art, MacCann was awarded a 3-year bursary from the Ministry of Education which he took to the Royal College of Art where he studied under Henry Moore. In 1932, in his final year at the RCA MacCann won a £10 sculpture prize after being nominated by his master. In addition to his studies under Moore, MacCann also attended a nightclass in stone-carving at Central London School of Arts and Crafts in 1932, and another at Chelsea Polytechnic.

Returning to Ulster in 1932 MacCann taught at Portadown College and at the Royal School in Armagh. In 1937 MacCann married Mercy Hunter whom he had met at Belfast School of Art. From 1937 until the outbreak of WW2 he lectured in sculpture at Belfast School of Art. In 1939 MacCann joined the Royal Inniskilling Fusiliers serving in India and Burma. When he was demobbed MacCann established himself on the teaching staff of Sullivan Upper School in Holywood where he remained for a short time.

== Life and works ==
In 1934 MacCann became a member of the ground-breaking Ulster Unit, a close relation of Paul Nash's Unit One, along with John Luke, Colin Middleton, Mercy Hunter, Romeo Toogood, and Crawford Mitchell amongst others, which had evolved from the short-lived Ulster Society of Painters. The group exhibited on just one occasion, at Locksley Hall, Belfast in December 1934. Middleton and MacCann commanded their own section where they displayed the most abstract paintings on show.

MacCann had exhibited in Locksley Hall in the previous November with a joint exhibition of the works of Margaret Yeames, Manus O'Keeffe and Joy McKean where the reviewer compliments the draughtsmanship in his drawings but questions the originality and finish of his sculptures. MacCann exhibited sculptures of Mercy Hunter, Angel Fish, Stone Woman and Girl's Head.

The critics were still talking of the 1934 exhibition when the artists were re-united for an exhibition in aid of the Youth Hostel Association, with the reviewer in the Northern Whig remarking,

"Not since Colin Middleton, Edward Mansfield, George MacCann, Romeo Toogood and other young artists held their first exhibition in Belfast has there been so stimulating a show as that which Lady Cushendun opened yesterday in John Magee's Gallery, Donegall Square West."

MacCann exhibited several experimental works at the exhibition, including The Sleeper which the critic calls "rather immature in concept", and the head of Mercy Hunter previously shown at Locksley House in 1933.

In 1938 MacCann was introduced to Louis MacNeice in a Belfast bookshop by the poet Maurice Craig, and the two became close friends. MacCann is the character of Maguire in MacNeice's Autumn Sequel. MacCann showed at the Magee Gallery on Donegall Square West in 1938, alongside John Hunter and Paul Nietsche.

In 1949 MacCann and his wife moved into a flat at 23 Botanic Avenue which became known as a gathering place for artists, poets and writers on the Belfast scene. At the behest of his wife MacCann had painted two murals in the property, one of Greek horses in the kitchen and another of the three Irish saints in the dining room. Both murals were lost after a car-bombing in 1972.

MacCann was commissioned by CEMA to produce two relief sculptures for the 1951 Festival of Britain at Derry's Guildhall. He also presented murals in the Northern Ireland section of the main exhibition on the South Bank in London and in the Ulster Farm and Factory Exhibition at Castlereagh. MacCann's work was also included in an exhibition by the RSUA design group, which was held in a bombed out building on the corner of Fountain Street and Castle Street in Belfast, and which also formed part of the Festival of Britain. Other exhibitors included FE McWilliam, William Scott and Rowel Friers.

Throughout much of his career MacCann exhibited with the Ulster Academy of Arts, and its successor the Royal Ulster Academy, participating in the annual exhibitions of 1948, in the years 1957-1959, between 1965-1967 and post-humously in 1968. In 1953 MacCann was represented at the CEMA exhibition of sculpture at the Belfast Museum and Art Gallery. He contributed a small equestrian sculpture to the British Industries Fair at Earl's Court in 1954, one of six Ulster artists to show work, including Mercy Hunter, Cherith McKinstry and Dan O'Neill. MacCann's work was included in an exhibition of sculpture organised by the Visual Art Group at the Whitla Hall Belfast in 1958, where he exhibited with Jacob Epstein, William Tocher and John Knox. MacCann held a solo exhibition at the New Gallery, Belfast in 1965. In 1966 he exhibited with the Irish Exhibition of Living Art and in the same year MacCann was elected an Associate member of the Royal Ulster Academy.

In a 1971 essay entitled Painting and Sculpture, the head of the Arts Council of Northern Ireland, Kenneth Jamison wrote of MacCann's work,

"...in a few public commissions and private works [MacCann] showed an affinity with Moore's formalism and with the direct carvings of Eric Gill and Epstein. In his painting there was here and there an echo of Christopher Wood, on occasions an oblique reference to Braque. He enjoyed a real sense of mythology and an intuitive feeling for classical tradition which can be clearly seen, not only in figurative romantic encounters of legendary heroes, but also in some later abstract works which evoke an Aegean nuance."

MacCann's work was wide and varied. He was a prolific writer, and in 1942 the Mourne Press published a collection of 12 short-stories, Sparrows Round My Brow, which was illustrated by his wife Mercy Hunter. In 1953 MacCann became a freelance commercial artist and completed work for the Group and Lyric Theatres in Belfast, and costumes for the Patricia Mulholland Irish Ballet, as well as murals in many pubs and restaurants. In 1961 his murals adorned the walls at the newly opened Spinnaker Restaurant in Kinsale. He also completed murals at the Royal School in Armagh, which is no longer extant, and at Avoniel Primary in Belfast.

In the summer of 1956 MacCann worked with the Colchester Repertory Theatre at Portstewart and he designed the sets for his friend Louis MacNeice's 1957 play Traitors In Our Way produced by Harold Goldblatt for Belfast's Group Theatre. The following year MacCann designed the set for Joseph Connolly's latest play Master of the House at the Group Theatre, directed by James Ellis, with Harold Goldblatt filling the lead role. He also designed the sets for Gerard McLarnon's play Bonefire at the Grand Opera House in 1958.

In 1963 MacCann paid tribute to his friend Louis MacNeice by travelling to London to make his Death Mask. As he moulded the death mask, MacCann is said to have recited an epitaph by the Greek sculptor Kallimachos, "They told me Heraclitus, they told me you were dead..."

== Death and legacy ==
George Galway MacCann died on 4 November 1967 aged 58. He had no children but was survived by his wife Mercy. As his funeral cortege passed down Botanic Avenue shops and businesses closed, and people lined the street to pay their respects.

Three months after his death the Arts Council of Northern Ireland honoured MacCann's life and works with an exhibition, hosted in the Old Library at Queen's University, as part of the Belfast International Arts Festival. The exhibition opened on what would have been MacCann's 59th birthday. Writing for the Belfast Telegraph, the critic AW Bowyer summed up MacCann's work:

"The work displayed indicates his wide range of interests and his keen observation of the contemporary scene during the last half-century. Those who knew him are aware that these interests embraced other arts, particularly literature, and some costume designs serve to show his contribution to drama"

The 1968 catalogue of the Royal Ulster Academy of Arts annual exhibition contained an appreciation of MacCann's work.

His work is represented in numerous public and private collections, including the Ulster Museum, the Armagh County Museum, and the National Self-Portrait of Ireland Collection in Limerick.
