= Gerard Dillon =

Irish artist (1916–1971)

- Born: 1915/1916; Belfast, Ireland
- Died: 14 June 1971 (aged 55)
- Resting place: Milltown Cemetery, Belfast, Northern Ireland
- Occupation: Artist

Gerard Dillon (1916 – 14 June 1971) was an Irish painter and artist.

== Life ==
Dillon was born in Belfast, he left school at the age of fourteen and for seven years worked as a painter and decorator, mostly in London. From an early age he was interested in art, cinema, and theatre. About 1936 he started out as an artist.

His Connemara landscapes provided the viewer with context, portraits of the characters who worked the land, atmosphere and idiosyncratic colour interpretations. Aged 18, Dillon went to London, initially working as a decorator. With the outbreak of the Second World War, he returned to Belfast. Over the next five years he developed as a painter in Dublin and Belfast. His works during this period were more than simple depictions of the life and people around him, they were reactions and interactions in paint.

In 1942, his first solo exhibition was opened by his friend and fellow artist, Mainie Jellett at The Country Shop, St. Stephen's Green, Dublin. "Father, Forgive Them Their Sins" featured depicting his concerns about the new war that had broken out. Despite a growing reputation, he had to return to London in 1944 to work on demolition gangs to restore his finances. In the late 1940s and during the 1950s, Dillon found himself favouring the town of Roundstone, Connemara. In 1951 he was introduced to Noreen Rice by her piano teacher. She had no formal training and she took Dillon and George Campbell as her mentors for decades and her work was of a similar surrealistic and primitive style.

In 1958, he had the double honour of representing Ireland at the Guggenheim International and Great Britain at the Carnegie International in Pittsburgh. He and his sister, Mollie, had a property on Abbey Road in 1958. They let off part of the house to Arthur Armstrong and they let a flat to Noreen Rice and her brother. He and Noreen would tour junk yards to find objects like leather and string that they included in their artwork.

He travelled widely in Europe and taught for brief periods in the London art schools.

== Last years ==
In 1967, Dillon suffered a stroke and spent six weeks in hospital; from this time his work changed direction. A notion of imminent death sent his work almost into another world, a realm of dreams and paintings intimating his death. In 1968 he was back in Dublin, where he helped to design sets and costumes for Seán O'Casey's play "Juno and the Paycock". He continued to paint and also to make tapestries, sitting at his Singer sewing machine.

In 1969, Dillon pulled his artworks from the Belfast leg of the Irish Exhibition of Living Art in purported protest during the Troubles against the "arrogance of the Unionist mob". However, Dillon did send work to Ulster when he donated work to Sheelagh Flanagan who had organised an exhibition for the relief of victims of the Belfast riots, in October 1969. His picture was displayed alongside the donated works of T. P. Flanagan, William Scott, F. E. McWilliam, Deborah Brown and Carolyn Mulholland as well as more than twenty others. Michael Longley retorted in a further letter, "Belfast needed creativity, it needed people like Gerard Dillon". During his last years, Dillon was invited to be involved in a children's art workshop in the National Gallery of Ireland.

Dillon died of a second stroke on 14 June 1971 at the age of 55. His grave, as requested, is unmarked in Belfast's Milltown Cemetery. Danlann Gerard Dillon/The Gerard Dillon Gallery in Cultúrlann McAdam Ó Fiaich is named in his honour.

In his biography of the artist, James White briefly touched on the artist's homosexuality: "such was his religious feeling that although he was drawn to people of that type, if he once had an encounter I believe that it never occurred again." The artist's nephew, Martin Dillon, recalled that after his uncle's death he found a diary entry describing a homosexual encounter with a sense of guilt, but the author Gerard Keenan insisted he was "a very well-adjusted homosexual". Reihill expanded on this, pointing to a probably unrequited love for the painter Dan O'Neil and also highlighted Dillon's association with gay artist Kenneth Hall, co-founder of the White Stag Group. Pictures with both overt and covert references are known.

== Sources ==
- Gerard Dillon, Art and Friendships Loan Exhibition Catalogue, Adams.ie; accessed 4 November 2016
- Profile of Gerard Dillon, adams.ie; accessed 4 November 2016
- Theo Snoddy, Dictionary of Irish Artists, 20th Century (2nd edition), Merlin, Dublin, 2002
- Profile, crawfordartgallery.com; accessed 4 November 2016
- Profile, jorgensenfineart.com; accessed 4 November 2016
