= Raymond Piper =

British botanist and artist (1923–2007)

Raymond Piper HRUA HRHA
- Born: 4 April 1923
- Died: 13 July 2007 (aged 84)
- Education: Self-taught
- Known for: Portraiture & botanical prints

Raymond Piper HRUA HRHA MUniv (4 April 1923 – 13 July 2007) was a British botanist and an artist.

== Early life ==
Raymond Piper was born in London on 4 April 1923 the son of Frank Piper. At the age of six his family moved to Belfast. Piper attended Skegoniel Primary before receiving a general education at Belfast Royal Academy.(according to the Dictionary of Ulster Biography he was educated at Mercantile College/later known after moving to Jordanstown as Belfast High School).

Piper attended nightclasses at Belfast School of Art for one year, where he was taught by Cornish artist Newton Penprase. For a time he was a teacher at the Royal School Dungannon. In 1950 Piper won a CEMA travel award which took him to Paris for a year.

Piper worked at Belfast shipbuilders Harland and Wolff between 1940 and 1946 where he carried sketch books in his pockets to fill in time between jobs. He sketched his fellow workers and pictures of Cave Hill, but he had no interest in capturing ships on paper.

Piper joined the Belfast Naturalists' Field Club in 1946 where he was twice president in 1971–1972 and 1983–1984. He became an Honorary Member in 1990. He took great interest in the flowers of Ireland especially orchids.

In 1947 fellow Belfast Naturalist Richard Hayward asked him to submit his best works to Hayward's publishers. They were impressed and shortly thereafter Piper gave up his engineering apprenticeship to become a professional artist. His main income was as a portrait painter and he included among his subjects several Lord Mayors of London and Belfast.

== Artistic career ==
Piper began a long association with the Ulster Academy of Arts in 1942 when he showed three works 'Dad', Sunrise Knockah 1941, and April Day, and exhibited a work each in 1944 and 1946, before an offering of two child portraits and a glass case called The White Goddess in 1948. Piper showed a portrait of Belfast coroner Dr HP Lowe along with a watercolour landscape at the 1950 annual exhibition after the Ulster Academy of Arts had been granted their Royal Charter. Piper contributed work to the short-lived Ulster literary magazine Rann, founded by Roy McFadden and Barbara Edwards (née Hunter) in 1948.

Piper began his career in illustrating old Irish buildings and sites of archaeological interest. Many of these drawings were used to illustrate books by fellow member of the Belfast Naturalists' Field Club, Richard Hayward, such as Ulster and the City of Belfast (1950), Connacht and the City of Galway (1952) and Munster and the City of Cork (1964). The latter publication contained 126 sketches by Piper, drawn on location in Munster in the spring of 1960 when Piper and his botanical friend explored the region together. The Belfast Telegraph's book reviewer writes,

"Perhaps the highest praise one can pay these collaborators is that their work is comparable to and in some ways excels Stephen Gywm and Hugh Thomson...Mr Piper contributes some exquisite sketches of the flora of the region which contains a remarkable number of plants and rocks."

Piper also held an exhibition with Richard Hayward at the Glenmachan Tower Hotel in Belfast earlier that year. Speaking of his choice of illustrator for Ulster and the City of Belfast, author Richard Hayward said,

"My choice of this young Belfast artist has turned out to be fortunate even beyond my high expectations and I would like to place on record my warm regard for the cheerful manner in which this young man has ever sought to accomplish the tasks which I set him as well as the deep satisfaction which the brilliance and integrity of his work has brought me."

The foreword to the book was written by Maurice Walsh, author of the Quiet Man.

The Council for the Encouragement of Music and the Arts awarded Piper a travel scholarship of £50 in 1950 when he had a choice of two destinations, Paris or Vienna.

Although Piper rarely exhibited he presented work at International Faculty of Arts in London in 1953. He also displayed three portraits including oils of ex-Belfast Lord Mayor Sir John Harcourt, and Ulster poet John Irvine, at the Royal Hibernian Academy in 1958.

In 1953 Piper presented his first solo exhibition at the CEMA Gallery in Belfast. The show was primarily portraits of local luminaries such as the producer and actor Harold Goldblatt, the playwright Patrick Riddell, and Lord Mayor James Norritt. The exhibition included none of Piper's recent topographical drawings but did include pastels of happy children and a few pencil drawings of old Belfast commissioned by CEMA for their local collections.

Early in 1956 Piper completed a fourteen foot high mural of Christ on the Sea of Galilee, The Flying Angel for the Belfast Seaman's Mission, where he was to return in 1977 to conduct repairs on the damaged painting. In May 1956 Piper completed a mural commission for the mammal house at Belfast Zoo. He exhibited at the CEMA gallery in 1957 alongside several of his Ulster contemporaries, all former recipients of CEMA travel bursaries. Piper also contributed a coloured print for the cover of Hayward's Border Foray in 1957.

Piper was commissioned to paint the Prime Minister of Northern Ireland, Lord Brookeborough on the occasion of his seventieth birthday in 1958.

Piper presented a one-man show at the Royal Watercolour Society Galleries, London in 1961. The show comprised 64 works and was opened by one of the subjects, the Lord Mayor of London Bernard Whaley-Cohen. In 1962 Piper hosted a solo exhibition in the Whitla Hall at Queen's University, Belfast. The Coffee Shop at the corner of College Street and Queens Street, Belfast, was the venue for an exhibition of two series of Piper's work in the same year. Piper made several contributions including a double portrait Audrey and Barbara and the nurseryman Sam McGredy to the Ulster Artists exhibition at the Magee Gallery also in 1962. His contemporaries on this occasion were T P Flanagan, Dan O'Neill, Kenneth Webb, Rowland Hill, Maurice Wilks and Frank McKelvey.

British Railways commissioned Piper to produce a poster in 1962 which promoted the Norfolk Broads.

In 1964 Piper was also elected Associate of the Royal Ulster Academy of Arts, at the same time as Romeo Toogood, George C Morrison, David Crone, and future President Richard J Croft. He showed a portrait of the academy's president and Belfast's artistic elderstatesman William Conor, and Oriental Girls at the Annual show that year. An open-air exhibition with many of Piper's RUA contemporaries was held at the Shambles Gallery in Hillsborough in August 1964, curated by Patric Stevenson, which exposed Piper's portrait of William Conor to a wider audience. Piper was also present when the Rolling Stones took an overcrowded Ulster Hall by storm in July 1964, with one sketch appearing in the Belfast Telegraph alongside a review of the gig.

The Botanic Inn on Belfast's Malone Road was the venue for a joint show with Jack W Gray in 1964. Piper also showed paintings of Short's aircraft at Farnborough Airshow in the same year.

A year later he held his first show in Dublin at the Brown Thomas Little Theatre Gallery. The Brown Thomas exhibition comprised 50 portraits and landscapes in pastel, oil and pencil and included a number of sketches previously published in Hayward's Munster and the City of Cork.

Piper revisited the Burren in 1968 where he had completed a set of works for Hayward's book on Munster and city of Cork in 1960. Piper's second visit saw him complete a series of oils on boards for Edwin Taylor and Alan Corkindale, owners of the Gregan's Castle Hotel, which had yet to be completed at the time of his first visit. The paintings originally hanged as panels but were removed during renovation work in the late 1970s when they were framed and encased in glass before their rehanging in the dining room. Piper contributed 120 line and coloured illustrations to Stephen Usherwood's 1968 anthology of Shakespeare's plays Shakespeare Play by Play.

Piper planned to write and publish his own book on Irish Orchids with the main aim being to promote the conservation of the thirty varieties of orchids in Ireland. By 1972 he had been writing and illustrating his book for six years. The completed illustrations were shown at an exhibition at Belfast Central Library in September 1972, but the book was never realised in his lifetime.

Olympic gold medal-winning pentathlete Mary Peters was the subject for a Piper portrait unveiled at the Ulster Arts Club in 1973.

Piper's orchid studies showed at the natural history section of the British Museum in 1974, and in the same year he was also awarded the John Lindley medal by the Royal Horticultural Society for his watercolours of Irish orchids. This was the first time that the medal had been awarded in Ireland. The Ulster Museum also held an exhibition of Piper's botanical works in 1975 as did the Royal Dublin Society in the following year. For his botanical works Piper was awarded a Fellowship of the Linnaean Society. In 1975 he was further honoured by his election as an Associate to the Royal Ulster Academy.

Piper's sketches of ballet stars including Margot Fonteyn, Rudolph Nureyev and Marie Rambert went on show at the Greater London Picture Exhibition in 1977 to mark the Silver Jubilee of reigning monarch Queen Elizabeth II. Piper had first sketched dancers in the early 1950s when the Marie Rambert troupe visited Belfast's Empire Theatre. He was subsequently invited to sketch backstage when Antoin Dolin brought the Festival Ballet to Ulster. Piper was later to be given access to sketch Nureyev in Covent Garden in 1965.

The wife of the Northern Irish Secretary of State Colleen Rees was the curator of a personal selection of works from Ulster Artists hosted at the Leeds Playhouse Gallery in 1976. Piper's work was among 49 artworks from various artists where he was displayed alongside TP Flanagan, Carolyn Mulholland, Joe McWilliams, Mercy Hunter, Tom Carr and many others.

Piper illustrated Arthur Stringer's 1977 book The Experienced Huntsman.

Piper raised the alarm and then served tea to firefighters in September 1979 after a blaze took hold of a neighbouring property that housed his studio. His studio and works were untouched, and all the occupants of the flat escaped unharmed.

In 1987 the Blackstaff Press produced Piper's Flowers, a limited edition that included five of his Irish orchid paintings, and the following year he received the Beck's bursary for outstanding services to botanical illustration. A Piper self-portrait was amongst 15 new exhibits inaugurated to the National Self Portrait Collection of Ireland in a show at the Kneafsey Gallery, Limerick, in spring 1987.

In 1991 Piper was elected as an Honorary Academician of the Royal Hibernian Academy. In 1996 the Ulster Museum hosted an exhibition of Treasures from the Royal Horticultural Society which included Piper's orchids. In 2002 Piper was elected an Honorary Academician of the Royal Ulster Academy of Arts.

His interests included music, ballet and reading. Piper is a past recipient of the RUA Gold Medal and the James Kennedy Memorial Award for Portraiture at the RHA.

== Death and legacy ==
Raymond Piper died on 13 July 2007. He was survived by two sisters, a nephew and one niece. Friend and poet Michael Longley delivered the eulogy at Piper's funeral at Roselawn Crematorium in Belfast on 18 July 2007. He penned a poem entitled The Orchid Man specially for the occasion.

His work can be found in the collections of Queen's University, Belfast, Royal Ulster Academy of Arts Diploma Collection, Belfast City Hall, the Ulster Museum, The National Self-Portrait Collection of Ireland, and the National Railway Museum, York.
