= Deborah Brown =

Northern Irish sculptor (1927–2023)

Deborah Brown HRUA
- Born: 29 September 1927; Belfast, Northern Ireland
- Died: 8 April 2023 (aged 95); Donegal, Ireland
- Education: Belfast School of Art; National College of Art & Design, Dublin, Ireland
- Known for: Sculpture, painting

Deborah Brown (29 September 1927 – 8 April 2023) was a Northern Irish sculptor. She is well known in Ireland for her pioneering exploration of the medium of fibre glass in the 1960s and established herself as one of the country's leading sculptors, achieving extensive international acclaim.

== Early life ==
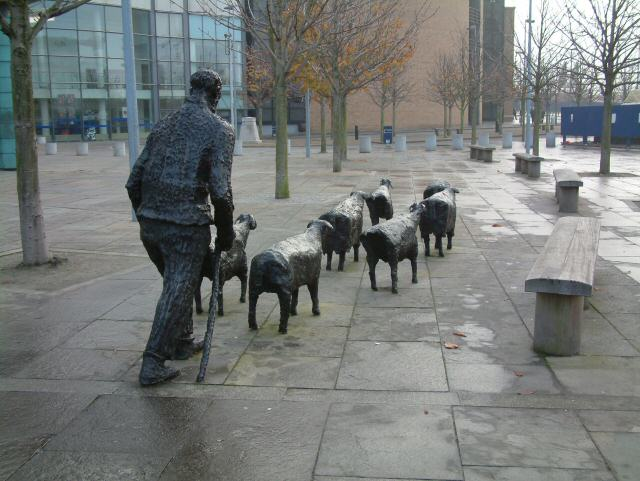
Sheep on the Road (1999), bronze, Waterfront Hall, Belfast

Deborah Brown was born in Belfast, Northern Ireland on 29 September 1927. Brown was an only child who became fascinated with nature during childhood years spent in Cushendun in the Glens of Antrim. Her grandmother is credited with encouraging her artwork and supplying her with paints and materials from a young age. In 1934, her family moved to Cushendun into a house designed by Tom Henry, the brother of the painter Paul Henry. Brown credited her Mother for instilling in her a love of animals, and along with the rural life of picking potatoes, cutting hay and turf, left an indelible mark on her work.

== Education ==
Brown had her first informal art lessons from James Humbert Craig who lived locally. Brown was initially educated at Belfast Royal Academy and towards the end of the war she studied at Richmond Lodge School after the family had returned to Belfast. She also received private lessons at Sydney Smith's studio in Belfast in 1944–45 when she was still at school. In preparation for attending art college, Brown was instructed in art-history by James McCord.

Brown studied landscape painting at Belfast College of Art in 1946 under Romeo Toogood and Newton Penprase before enrolling at the National College of Art and Design in Dublin in 1947, to study painting for three years. In Dublin she studied under Sean Keating, Maurice MacGonigal, Lucy Charles, and Professor Herkner who taught sculpture, and in addition she attended the National University under Françoise Henry to learn art-history. Brown joined a group with artist and musician Michael Morrow and friends, where she played bass viol, having been classically trained in piano and cello at a young age. After three years studying in Dublin she continued her studies in Paris, where she became interested in the primary colours of European Modernism. Brown stayed in Paris for three months lodging with a French family. She visited the Jeu de Paume and the Louvre, and became acquainted with the work of Picasso, Giacometti, Matisse and de Staël amongst many others.

As a student she was a frequent visitor to the Irish Exhibition of Living Art, the Hugh Lane Municipal Gallery, the National Gallery and Victor Waddington's gallery. Brown's abstract paintings were heavily influenced by the works of Mark Rothko, Jackson Pollock, Antoni Tàpies, Lucio Fontana and William Scott.

== Life and work ==
Upon returning to Belfast in 1951, Brown made preparations for her first solo exhibition at the CEMA Gallery, for which the poet John Hewitt contributed an introduction to the catalogue. The exhibition consisted of thirty-five oils which were predominantly landscapes, woodland scenes and rivers. In the same year Brown befriended Alice Berger Hammerschlag with whom she remained friends until her death in 1969. Brown was later asked by Kenneth Jamison, the Director of the Arts Council of Northern Ireland, to select a committee to oversee an arts bursary scheme set-up in memory of Berger Hammerschlag and which aided many younger artists to travel and to purchase equipment and materials.

After seeing Brown's work in the Belfast Museum and Art Gallery, the Scottish Colourist John D Fergusson invited Brown to show at the British Council rooms in Glasgow in 1955. In the following year Brown had a solo exhibition of thirty-six paintings at The City Gallery in Belfast. The works were "carried out in a broad forceful expressionist manner and in non-naturalistic colour". Writing of Brown's abstraction in the 1959 annual exhibition of the Royal Ulster Academy Kenneth Jamison compares her to Olive Henry,

"Olive Henry is more decadent by instinct, a fine formaliser. Her pictures Man and Ropes and Riviera Port, well defined and carefully abstracted, contrast in form with Deborah Brown's freer Oil Over Tempra,[sic] 1959. But I can not go all the way with Miss Brown's disregard for formal values. Regretably -for I respect this artist's sincerity of purpose- I find the result neither aesthetically pleasing nor purposefully communicative"

In 1956, Mary O'Malley having seen Brown's abstract paintings, asked Brown to paint some stage sets which had been designed by George Morrow, for the Lyric Theatre in Belfast. In 1960, Brown was appointed one of seven trustees of the newly formed Lyric Players Trust including TP Flanagan and John Hewitt. Her involvement with stage design and the creation of various props provoked her interest in sculpture.

Brown travelled throughout the northern Italy in the 1960s, to Rome, Sienna, Florence and Ravenna, where she studied the works of Botticelli, Donatello, Michaelangelo and Fontana.

Brown became a member of the Free Painters and Sculptors and the Women's International Art Club in the early 1960s, and worked in her father's office to supplement her income. She went on to take her professional exams in Chattels and Fine Arts, providing her with an in depth knowledge of the history of furniture, silver, porcelain and painting, as well as the laws of surveying, bookkeeping and property. Brown was later to become a partner in the firm. In 1965, Brown gained a major commission from the architects Cruikshank & Seward for the Ferranti Building in Manchester. These eight large panels marked Brown's final flirtation with pure abstraction.

From the mid-sixties onwards Brown's work moved from creating papier maché reliefs on canvas to becoming increasingly three dimensional, and upon a suggestion from George MacCann, Brown began to work with fibre-glass. In 1966 she was introduced to the owner of the Hendricks Gallery where she secured a one-woman exhibition that same year. In 1969 Brown had a solo exhibition at the Arts Council of Northern Ireland gallery. Brown donated a picture to an exhibition to raise funds for victims of civil disturbances in Belfast in the autumn of 1969. The exhibition at Queen's University was organised by Sheelagh Flanagan and showed the work of T. P. Flanagan, William Scott and F E McWilliam, in addition to Mercy Hunter, Carolyn Mulholland and more than twenty others.

Brown was awarded the IR£400 Carroll Open Prize for painting at the Irish Exhibition of Living Art in 1970 for Fibreglass form on canvas, painted red and black.

Brown served as chairperson of the Visual Arts Committee of the Arts Council throughout the 1970s. In 1973, Brown joined Theo McNab in representing Ireland at the Cagnes-sur-Mer International Festival.

In 1982, the Arts Council delivered a major retrospective of her work hosted by the Ulster Museum and the Hugh Lane Municipal Gallery. Two years later Brown was invited to show with ROSC alongside 7 other Irish artists including Felim Egan, Barrie Cooke and Seán Scully which resulted in a further exhibition in the following year with the same artists, in the Armstrong Gallery in New York. Around the same time Brown retired from her father's firm and relocated back to Cushendun where she converted two outhouses into a studio.

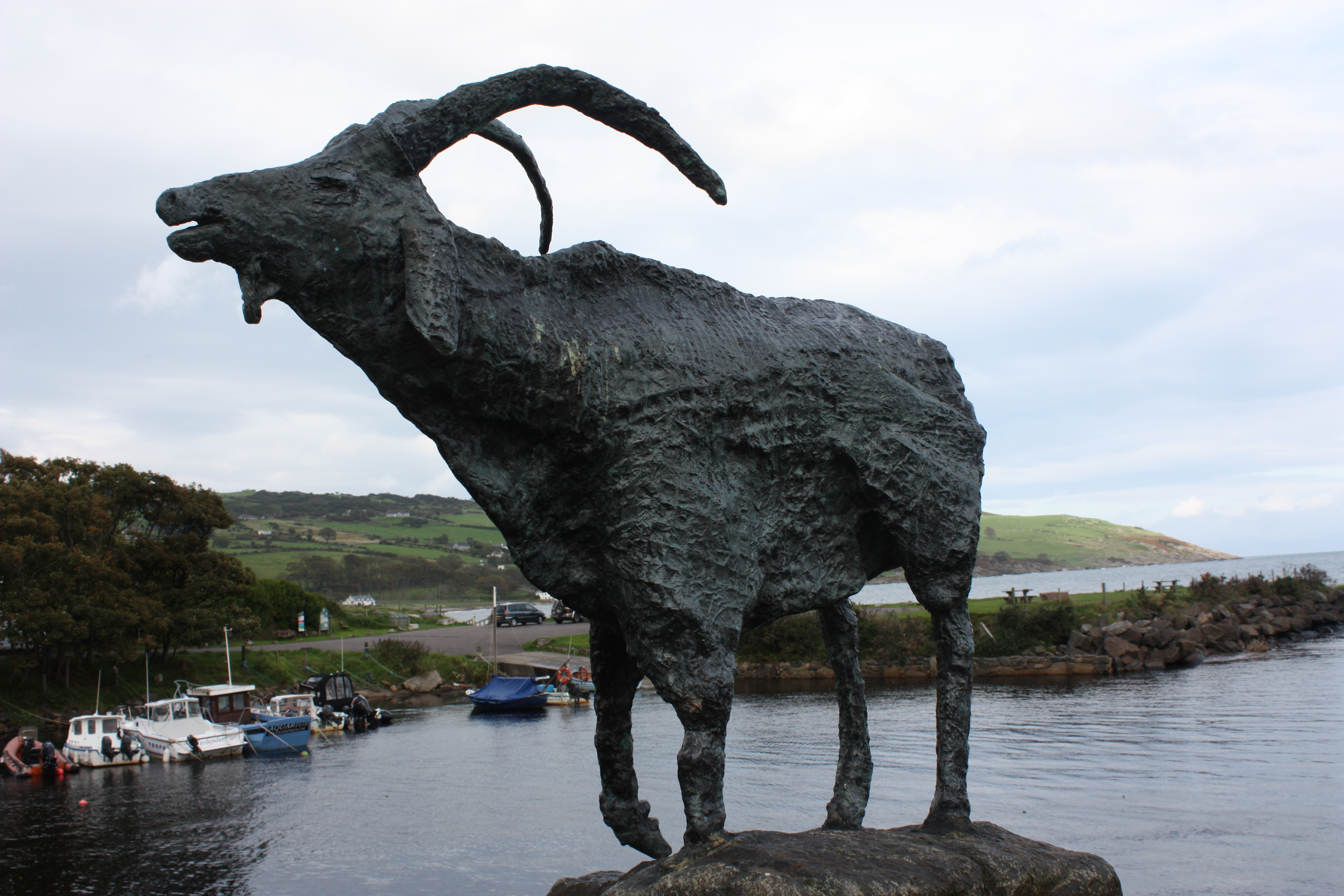
Johann (2002), Bronze on granite plinth, Cushendun, County Antrim

At this time Brown was working on mainly animals in wire and papier-maché and when Sheelagh Flanagan became her agent in Northern Ireland she cast her first sheep in bronze and fulfilled Lord Belmore's request to cast a life-size papier-maché goat in bronze. That goat who served as a model is known as Johann, and was owned by the local vet in Cushendun until he was culled in the Foot and Mouth crisis of 2001. The bronze now sits on the same site as the animal normally sat, and has become a popular local landmark. Brown's animal sculptures were exhibited at Flanagan's Shambles Gallery in 1989.

A Brown self-portrait was amongst 15 new exhibits inaugurated to the National Self Portrait Collection of Ireland in a show at the Kneafsey Gallery, Limerick, in spring 1987. The Solomon Gallery in Dublin hosted an exhibition of Brown's sculptures in November of the same year.

In 2016, Brown was the recipient of the Mullan Gallery Prize for the best sculpture at the Annual Royal Ulster Academy exhibition at the Ulster Museum for her work The Visitor.

== Death ==
Brown died on 8 April 2023 in Donegal, having spent around two decades of her life in the town of Ramelton. She was 95.

== Legacy ==
Brown's work is included in many collections in Ireland and abroad, including the Ulster Museum, Raidió Teilifís Éireann, Bank of Ireland, the Hugh Lane Municipal Gallery, the Irish Museum of Modern Art, the Arts Council of Northern Ireland, and the National Self-Portrait Collection of Ireland.

== Selected works ==
- Sheep on the Road (1991), Life-size bronze, originally commissioned by the Arts Council of Northern Ireland for their sculpture garden at Riddell Hall, Belfast. In 1999 it was purchased by Laganside Corporation, after relocation of the Arts Council of Northern Ireland, and relocated to the entrance to the Waterfront Hall, Lanyon Place, Belfast.

== Exhibitions ==
- 1946 & 1949 Ulster Academy of Arts Exhibition: Belfast Museum & Art Gallery, Northern Ireland
- 1948 Royal Hibernian Academy Annual Exhibition, Dublin, Ireland
- 1949 Society of Women Artists 88th Annual Exhibition: RBA Galleries, London, England
- 1950, 1951, 1952, 1953, 1958, 1960 & 1961 Royal Ulster Academy Annual Exhibition: Belfast Museum & Art Gallery, Belfast, Northern Ireland
- 1951 Deborah Brown Oil Paintings: CEMA Gallery, Belfast, Northern Ireland
- 1954 Deborah Brown: The Mayfair Gallery, London, England
- 1955 CEMA Spring Exhibition: The Art Gallery, Stranmillis, Belfast, Northern Ireland
- 1955 Deborah Brown: The British Council, Glasgow, Scotland
- 1956 Deborah Brown: Belfast Museum and Art Gallery, Northern Ireland, curated by John Hewitt
- 1959 Deborah Brown: New Vision Art Centre, London, England
- 1959 Ulster Society of Women Artists: Belfast Museum & Art Gallery, Belfast, curated by James White
- 1959 Royal Ulster Academy Annual Exhibition: The City Gallery, Stranmillis, Belfast, Northern Ireland
- 1960 Ulster Society of Women Artists: Brown & Thomas' Little Theatre, Dublin, Ireland, curated by Fr. Jack Hanlon
- 1960 Contemporary Ulster Artists: CEMA Gallery, Belfast, Northern Ireland
- 1960 Deborah Brown & Alice Berger Hammerschlag: New Vision Art Centre, London, England
- 1960 Paintings & Drawings by Ulster Artists: The Lyric Players Theatre, Belfast
- 1961 The Visual Arts Group: Whitla Hall, Belfast. Northern Ireland
- 1961 Ulster Society of Women Artists: CEMA Gallery, Belfast, Northern Ireland
- 1961, 1966, 1968, 1970, 1971, 1972, 1973, 1975, 1976 & 1978 Irish Exhibition of Living Art: The National College of Art, Dublin, Ireland
- 1962 & 1969 Deborah Brown: the Arts Council of Northern Ireland Gallery, Belfast
- 1964 Deborah Brown: New Vision Art Centre, London, England
- 1964 Deborah Brown: the New Gallery, Belfast, Northern Ireland
- 1966 Deborah Brown: the Richie Hendriks Gallery, Dublin, Ireland
- 1966 Open Painting Exhibition, the Ulster Museum, Belfast, Northern Ireland, curated by the Arts Council of NI
- 1966 Art & Industry Exhibition: Royal Marine Hotel, Dun Laoghaire, Ireland
- 1967 Irish Exhibition of Living Art: the Ulster Museum, Belfast, Northern Ireland
- 1967 Four Ulster Artists: the New Gallery, Belfast, Northern Ireland
- 1968 & 1970 Open Painting Exhibition: Arts Council of Northern Ireland Gallery, Belfast
- 1968 Duchas: Exhibition of Ulster Artists, The Old Library Gallery, Queens University, Belfast, Northern Ireland
- 1973 Artist's Choice Exhibition: the Ulster Museum, Belfast, Northern Ireland
- 1974 Collection of the Arts Council of Northern Ireland Touring Exhibition: Eire Arts Council Gallery, Dublin, Ireland
- 1975 Oireachtas Art Exhibition, Hugh Lane Municipal Gallery, Dublin, Ireland
- 1976 Royal Ulster Academy Annual Exhibition: Ulster Museum, Belfast, Northern Ireland
- 1982 Deborah Brown: Ulster Museum, Belfast, & the Hugh Lane Municipal Gallery, Dublin, Ireland
- 1984 ROSC, Guinness Hop Store, Dublin, Ireland
- 1985 Nine Irish Artists from ROSC, Armstrong Gallery, New York, USA
- 1987 Soloman Gallery, Dublin
- 1989 Deborah Brown in the 80s: The Shambles Gallery, Hillsborough, County Down
- 2005 Deborah Brown: From Painting to Sculpture, Ava Gallery, Bangor, County Down, curated by Dr Hilary Pyle
- 2006 Cross Section: Sligo Art Gallery. Sligo, Ireland
- 2012 Ireland: Her People and Landscape, Ava Gallery, Bangor, County Down
- 2014 IRISH WOMEN ARTISTS 1870 - 1970, Ava Gallery, Clandeboye Estate, County Down
