= T. P. Flanagan =

Northern Irish artist and teacher (1929–2011)

T. P. Flanagan MBE DFA
- Born: Terence Philip Flanagan; 15 August 1929; Enniskillen, County Fermanagh, Northern Ireland
- Died: 22 February 2011 (aged 81); Belfast, County Antrim
- Education: Belfast College of Art
- Known for: Painting
- Style: Abstract
- Spouse: Sheelagh Garvan (m. 1959)
- Website: http://flanagan-art.com/index.html

Terence Philip Flanagan, MBE, DFA (15 August 1929 – 22 February 2011) was a landscape painter and teacher from Northern Ireland.

== Early life ==
Flanagan was born on 15 August 1929 in Enniskillen, County Fermanagh. He was the eldest of seven children, whom were raised by two aunts after their mother died at a young age. Flanagan received a general education from the Presentation Brothers at St Michael's College, Enniskillen between from 1943 to 1949.

Flanagan took up painting in his teens and learned the art of watercolour painting from the local portraitist and landscape artist Kathleen Bridle in night classes at Enniskillen Technical College. He attended Belfast College of Art from 1949 until 1953 studying under Romeo Toogood, John Luke and Tom Carr. After his graduation, Flanagan taught at the Convent of the Sacred Heart of Mary in Lisburn and the Assumption Convent in Ballynahinch, County Down, before obtaining a full-time post at St. Mary's College of Education in 1955 where he stayed for 29 years until his retirement in 1984. He became Head of Art at St. Mary's in 1965.

== Marriage ==
In 1959, Flanagan married actress Sheelagh Garvan of the Lyric Players.

== Career ==
Flanagan showed one oil painting Deirdre at the 1953 Oireachtas Exhibition in Dublin but waited until 1969 to contribute another, Inbhear. He exhibited regularly at Oireachtas throughout the 1970s and beyond. Flanagan was later awarded the Oireachtas painting prize in 1974.

Flanagan joined Wilfred Stewart and Lewis Logan for a three-man show at Belfast's CEMA Gallery in February 1954 when he exhibited a number of works including Twilight, Howard Street which he showed three months later at the Ulster Arts Club. In 1954, Flanagan also participated in his first annual Royal Ulster Academy of Arts exhibition, showing three works, two flower paintings and one landscape. He contributed two works to the annual exhibitions in both 1955 and 1956. The Committee for the Encouragement of Music and Art gave Flanagan his first one-man show hosted by the Piccolo Gallery, Belfast in November 1958.

By the 1960s, Flanagan had carved out a successful and parallel career as an artist, and his family became close to poet Seamus Heaney's family. Flanagan painted Boglands (for Seamus Heaney) in 1967 which formed part of his Gortahork Series. Heaney reciprocated in writing Bogland: for TP Flanagan published in the collection entitled Door into the Dark of 1969. Seamus Heaney, for whom he painted various pieces, described Flanagan as being in tune "with the notion of an earthly paradise and hence the radiance of the painting is entirely this-worldly...and always there has been that necessary painterly hedonism".

In 1960, Flanagan was appointed one of seven trustees of the newly formed Lyric Players Trust including Deborah Brown and John Hewitt, a position he was to hold for five years. That same year he displayed his work at the new CEMA Gallery. An invited artist, he showed alongside several others including Colin Middleton, Deborah Brown, Gerard Dillon and William Conor, at the inaugural exhibition in the gallery designed by the architect Robert McKinstry. In 1961, Flanagan was patronised with a one-man show at CEMA's Chicester Street Gallery of which the Belfast Telegraph's Kenneth Jamison writes:

"Light is the artist's theme, its flux rain-filtered over moist fields, spilling an irregular pattern on low lough-side hills, mirrored again from the still lough's face...Always one is conscious of the infinite subtle modulations of light and colour. He does not refine forms. Rather he simplifies in terms of light and paint to reveal the sheer mood and poetry of the experience; but there is nothing casual about the structure of his pictures."

Flanagan produced the set for the Lyric's production of JM Synge's Deirdre of the Sorrows in 1963.

Flanagan had a one-man exhibition at the Richie Hendricks Gallery in Dublin and showed two works at the Irish Exhibition of Living Art's twenty-fifth anniversary show in 1964. He showed in the Four Ulster Painters exhibition at the Arnolfini Gallery in Bristol in 1964.

Deborah Brown invited Flanagan on to the committee to oversee an arts bursary scheme set-up in memory of patron of the arts, Alice Berger-Hammerschlag in 1970 which aided many younger artists to travel and to purchase equipment and materials. The Arts Council of Northern Ireland's gallery was the venue for Flanagan's 1966 solo exhibition. In 1968, Flanagan's work travelled to John Hewitt's Herbert Art Gallery for a joint show where he exhibited with Colin Middleton. Flanagan donated a picture to an exhibition to raise funds for victims of civil disturbances in Belfast in the autumn of 1969. The exhibition at Queen's University was organised by his wife, Sheelagh, and showed work from thirty artists, including Deborah Brown, Cherith McKinstry, William Scott and F E McWilliam.

In 1971, his work was included in the international exhibition, ROSC: The Irish Imagination in Dublin. Kathleen Bridle was reunited with her two most famous students in 1973 when the Arts Council of Northern Ireland staged a touring exhibition of her works alongside Flanagan and William Scott.

The wife of the Northern Irish Secretary of State Colleen Rees was the curator of a personal selection of works from Ulster Artists hosted at the Leeds Playhouse Gallery in 1976. Flanagan's work was among 49 works from various artists where he was displayed alongside Raymond Piper, Carolyn Mulholland, Joe McWilliams, Mercy Hunter, Tom Carr and many others. In 1977, the Arts Council of Northern Ireland held a solo exhibition of his work from 1967 to 1977.

Flanagan was part of a consortium of forty well-known Ulster names who attempted to win the Independent Television franchise for Northern Ireland in 1979. He became an Associate of the Royal Hibernian Academy in 1983. In 1984, the National Self-Portrait Gallery purchased a Flanagan self-portrait alongside fellow Northerners Brian Ballard, Brian Ferran and F E McWilliam.

Flanagan was resident artist at Sligo Art Gallery for the duration of the 1991 Yeat's Summer School. His exhibition was based on thirty works created and inspired by the Sligo landscape where he had spent considerable time in his childhood. The collection spanned most of his career beginning with those created in the 1960s.

The Ulster Museum hosted a major retrospective covering fifty years of Flanagan's work in 1995. The catalogue contained a foreword written by Seamus Heaney and a critical essay by Curator of Art at the Ulster Museum, Brian Kennedy. Shortly thereafter Flanagan accepted an invite to present a retrospective at the Stadsmuseum Gothenburg, Sweden.

In 2000, Flanagan returned to the Sligo Art Gallery to present a joint exhibition of works with his daughter Catherine and son Philip. In the year before his death Flanagan showed at the Ormeau Baths Gallery where he exhibited works relating to the Troubles.

Although he exhibited widely, Flanagan was represented for many years by the Tom Caldwell Gallery in Belfast and by the David Hendriks Gallery in Dublin. In later years Flanagan was represented by the Taylor Gallery in Dublin.

== Commissions ==
William Keith, director of the Wellington Tank Company, commissioned Flanagan and three of his Ulster contemporaries, Basil Blackshaw, Charles McAuley and James McIntyre to paint one picture each to be donated to the geriatric ward at Belfast City Hospital, who had cared for his dying father just a few months earlier.

The 1970s saw Flanagan complete a number of prestigious commissions including one to produce a design commemorating the fiftieth anniversary of the formation of the Northern Irish state, Ulster '71, in 1970. He received a further commission from the Ulster '71 Festival committee in the following year when he produced a mural in County Fermanagh.

The Arts Council of Northern Ireland funded a Flanagan portrait of Belfast feminist, trade-unionist and peace activist Saidie Patterson in 1975. In 1977, he completed a line-drawing portrait for Gael Linn's eponymous double LP by Donegal fiddler John Doherty which was released a year later.

Flanagan contributed to The Great Book of Ireland/Leabhar Mór na hÉireann, commissioned and edited by Theo Dorgan and Gene Lambert. The hand-drawn volume on vellum contained works by 143 poets, 121 artists, 9 composers and 1 calligrapher. It was displayed at the Irish Museum of Modern Art at Kilmainham for three months in 1991.

The BBC commissioned him to make a film about his painting practise entitled The Painted Landscape, in 1999.

== Awards ==
- Royal Ulster Academy: In 1960, Flanagan was elected as an Associate of the Royal Ulster Academy of Arts. A mere four years later he was elected an Honorary Academician of the same institution. He was elected President of the RUA in 1978 when he replaced the previous incumbent Mercy Hunter, and was re-elected in three subsequent years. Flanagan was the recipient of the Royal Ulster Academy Gold Medal at the 95th Annual show in 1976 for Study of Castlecoole, Theme described by critic Elizabeth Baird as "a typical Flanagan landscape with subtle, blurred colours and soft light".
- University of Ulster: Flanagan became only the second ever recipient of the honorary degree of Doctor of Fine Arts when he received the accolade from the University of Ulster in 2010. It was conferred at a special ceremony hosted in the Arts Council of Northern Ireland's Ormeau Baths Gallery, and was awarded in recognition of his outstanding services to art. Flanagan received an MBE in 2011 for his "services to art internationally".

== Death and legacy ==
Flanagan died in Belfast on 22 February 2011, aged 81. His works are in public and private collections including the Ulster Museum, the Arts Council of Northern Ireland, the Hugh Lane Gallery, the National Self-Portrait Collection of Ireland, the Irish Museum of Modern Art, and the Herbert Gallery.

== Biography ==
- Kennedy, S. B. (2013) T. P. Flanagan: Painter of Light and Landscape (Featuring a foreword by Séamus Heaney), Lund Humphries.
