= Romeo Toogood =

Irish artist (1902–1966)

Romeo Toogood ARCA, HRUA
- Born: 6 May 1902; Belfast, County Antrim
- Died: 11 August 1966 (aged 64); Belfast, County Antrim
- Resting place: Carnmoney East Cemetery, County Antrim
- Education: Belfast School of Art; Royal College of Art
- Known for: Landscape painting

Romeo Toogood ARCA HRUA (6 May 1902- 11 August 1966) was an Ulster artist and teacher who specialized in landscape painting.

== Early life ==
Romeo Charles Toogood was born in Belfast on 6 May 1902. He was the son of a stone-carver, Charles Toogood, who had moved from England to work on the construction of Belfast City Hall.

He was married to Anne in 1932 and had four children, one of whom died at the age of six.

== Education ==
Toogood received a general education at Hillman Street Public Elementary School until he found work at the age of fourteen as a painter and decorator.

Toogood began his professional training at Belfast School of Art in 1922 and graduated in 1925.

Between the years 1925 and 1928 Toogood delivered evening classes at the College and amassed £300 which he took to the Royal College of Art in London to continue his studies. His funds did not last the three years that Toogood had intended, therefore he successfully petitioned the College administrators to allow him to complete a year early.

Toogood returned to Belfast in 1930 where he was to enter his first teaching post in 1931 at Larne Technical School. He moved to Down High School in 1933 and worked part-time until 1948. During this period, from 1932 onwards, he also taught at Dungannon Technical School.

== The artist ==
Toogood became a member of the Belfast Art Society in 1927. He experimented with magic realism.

In 1933 Toogood joined the newly formed Northern Ireland Guild of Artists inaugural exhibition at the State Buildings on Arthur Street, Belfast. Exhibiting alongside old stalwarts William Conor, John Hunter, Morris Harding and Edward Mansfield, as well as the younger generation such as Colin Middleton, Kathleen Bridle and the sculptor Betty Clements. Toogood showed a painting of Larne and three lino-cuts of which the critic in the Northern Whig stated that they "all have a vitality and purposefulness that are individual."

He presented three paintings with the Ulster Academy of Arts, the successor to the Belfast Art Society, in 1934, Islandmagee, Dungannon, and The Backyard, at the Old Museum Arts Centre. Of greater significance that year was when Toogood became a member of the avant-garde Ulster Unit, a close relation of Paul Nash's Unit One. The group had evolved from the short-lived Ulster Society of Painters and included artists such as John Luke, Colin Middleton, Mercy Hunter, George MacCann and Crawford Mitchell. They showed together on just one occasion at Locksley Hall, Belfast in December 1934. SB Kennedy of the Ulster Museum listed Toogood as one of the most influential artists in the exhibition. Toogood displayed two oils, one of which, The Backyard, was also shown at the Old Museum in the same month. The second was an interior of a theatre, simply entitled Theatre. In the catalogue Toogood set-out his artistic philosophy:

"The painter's aim, I think, is to find in nature some sense of formal order, and to translate the same in terms of form and colour into a pattern which relates to the size and shape of his canvas, the degree of abstraction used depending on the individual painter."

The Academy elected Toogood an associate in 1935, inaugurated with Kathleen Bridle, Colin Middleton, Helen Brett, Patrick Marrinan, Maurice Wilks and William St. John Glenn. In the same year Toogood's 1933 oil, Dan Nancy's, Cushendun was displayed in an exhibition at the Mansion House in Dublin by the Haverty Trust, before becoming one of ten works donated to the Belfast Museum and Art Gallery. In 1936 Toogood showed two paintings at the Royal Hibernian Academy, his only showing with the society. He was also elected a member of ruling council at the Ulster Academy of Arts in 1936, and again in 1944. The critics were still talking of the 1934 exhibition of four years earlier, when the participants were re-united for a show in aid of the Youth Hostel Association, where the reviewer in the Northern Whig remarked,

"Not since Colin Middleton, Edward Mansfield, George MacCann, Romeo Toogood, and other young artists held their first exhibition in Belfast has there been so stimulating a show as that which Lady Cushendun opened yesterday in John Magee's Gallery, Donegall Square West."

Toogood displayed a painting of Glencoe which the same reviewer refers to as "one [of] the most interesting in the exhibition, mainly because of its colouring and its naiveté."

The Haverty Trust founded by the Irish portrait painter Thomas Haverty purchased another of Toogood's paintings in 1940. The painting of Barge at Edenderry painted in 1936 depicts the private quay and well-known premises of John Shaw Brown & Sons, linen merchants. It was donated to the Belfast Museum and Art Gallery in addition to fourteen works by John Luke, Mainie Jellett, Seán Keating, Charles Lamb, Nano Reid and others. Barge at Edenderry was later immortalised in a poem of the same name by Robert Johnstone.

Toogood contributed work to the Civil Defence Art Exhibition in 1943. Gleno was accepted from 1,300 works submitted to the juried exhibition of which 720 were displayed at Belfast Museum and Art Gallery. The painting was amongst twelve works including Markey Robinson's Bomb Crater in Eglington Street and Fire at the International, and James McCord's McAdam's Farm, forwarded to London for inclusion in the Civil Defence Exhibition on Bond Street that summer.

Writing in a 1944 essay entitled Paint in Ulster the critic John Hewitt described Toogood's work:

"His colour is altogether quieter than Luke's; his shapes not so sharply formalised, his vision closer to normal representation. He prefers a high skyline or none at all, and a broad landscape in which the brown ploughed fields, the dark hedges and the meadows, the slate roofs and white-washed gables make a pleasing pattern of unemphatic but subtly related colour, organised mainly by manipulation of diagonal tensions."

Toogood contributed two paintings in the October 1945 Ulster Academy exhibition, including a watercolour and an oil, which the Northern Whig's reviewer lists amongst the "notable" works. A month later on 30 November 1945, Toogood's son Jeremy died. Toogood was to suffer from depression for the rest of his life and was to effect his early retirement.

In 1946 the Council for the Encouragement of Music and Art purchased a painting by Toogood, in addition to works by other contemporary Ulster artists. Twenty-four of the works from the CEMA collection, including Toogood's painting, were later presented at their Donegall Place gallery in 1954.

He contributed one painting called Little White Horse to the Ulster Academy of Arts exhibition in 1948. In 1948 Toogood also joined the teaching staff at Friends School Lisburn where he remained for a year before his appointment as the master of painting and drawing at Belfast College of Art. Toogood was to remain at the art college until his retirement in 1963.

During his tenure at the Belfast College of Art he supervised the painting of two 20 by 30 foot murals in the lounge and restaurant, and two further panels in the banqueting hall and private dining room, at the Midland Hotel in Belfast in 1951. One of the murals was a composite picture of Ulster landmarks, and the second was a docklands scene with the Antrim hills in the background. The architect WH Hamlyn commissioned the works on behalf of the Ulster Transport Authority and amongst the students who produced the paintings were Basil Blackshaw, RG Linton, AH Peel, Augustus Little, WF Kennedy, H Magowan and RJ MacKey. The hotel was closed in the 1970s, and later demolished along with the wall paintings in 2017.

Amongst his many students were Basil Blackshaw, Cherith McKinstry (née Boyd), Kenneth Jamison, and TP Flanagan. Barber claims that Blackshaw's sense of order and construction can be directly attributed to Toogood's teaching. Jamison suggested that Toogood's own practice was negatively affected by his concentration on teaching, that he referred to as "an extraordinary compound of allusion and metaphor patiently contrived for the individual."

Toogood offered two oils Sammy's Boats, Ballintoy and Her New Suit in the 1957 show hosted by the Belfast Art College Association at the Stranmillis Art Gallery. Kenneth Jamision wrote of Toogood's formative influence on the work of his students and described the strengths of the work on display:

"Subtly modulated planes define space, giving these shore-scapes an underlying 'architectural' framework, and in carefully considered compositions Toogood proves the value of sound craftmanship."

Six months later Toogood was back at the Belfast Museum and Art Gallery for the annual display by the members of the Royal Ulster Academy, when he showed one work, an oil of the Clarendon Dock at Belfast harbour.

Although Toogood rarely exhibited his works, CEMA convinced him to host a small solo exhibition at the Piccolo Gallery in Belfast in 1958. The works displayed included a mix of landscapes and portraits, including a Self Portrait and another, Anthea, whose pose was compared to an early Augustus John. Sammy's Boats, Ballintoy, shown a year earlier with Belfast Art College Association was also on display.

Toogood contributed a singular painting, William to the 1963 annual exhibit of the Royal Ulster Academy of Arts, and a further two paintings, On the Road to BallyLesson and Ballylesson, to the eighty-fourth exhibition in 1964.

In the year following his retirement in 1964, Toogood exhibited thirty-four watercolours and nine oils at the Magee Gallery in Belfast. All but one were landscapes. He had exhibited there once before in a group show of 1949. Toogood returned to the Magee Gallery in July 1964 with contributions to the Summer Exhibition, alongside Frank McKelvey, Dennis Osborne, Colin Middleton and William Conor.

Toogood was elected an Honorary Academician of the Royal Ulster Academy in the same year. Less than a year before his death, he was re-elected. In 1965 Toogood joined twelve Ulster artists including Alice Berger-Hammerschlag, Olive Henry, and Mercy Hunter in a diverse exhibition of landscape paintings at the Arts Council Of Northern Ireland Gallery.

He showed posthumously with four pictures in the Royal Ulster Academy's annual exhibition of 1966.

== Death & legacy ==
Romeo Toogood died in hospital on 11 August 1966. He was 64 years of age. Toogood was survived by his wife Anne, two sons and a daughter.

A post-humous retrospective was hosted by the Arts Council of Northern Ireland in 1978. The exhibition included examples from his landscapes, portraits, oils, watercolours, and printmaking from every period of his life. Toogood's legacy was summarised by the Director of the Arts Council for Northern Ireland Kenneth Jamison in an essay entitled Painting and Sculpture when he wrote:

"...he adapted his attitude and seemed capable of projecting himself into every technical and aesthetic problem. Ulster painting owes him an incalculable debt."

A second retrospective was dedicated to Toogood when the Bell Gallery in Belfast showed a range of his paintings in 1989. In 2011 the Department of Finance and Personnel reported that a Toogood watercolour of Shaw's Bridge and the River Lagan, purchased in 1994 and valued at £1250 had gone missing from the civil service collection at Dundonald House in 2002.

Toogood's works can be found in many public and private collections including the Ulster Museum, Royal Ulster Academy of Arts Diploma Collection, Arts Council of Northern Ireland, Department of Environment for Northern Ireland, Down County Museum and Friends School, Lisburn.
