= Basil Blackshaw =

Artist from Northern Ireland (1932–2016)

Basil Blackshaw HRUA, HRHA
- Born: July 1932; Glengormley, Belfast
- Died: 2 May 2016 (aged 84)
- Education: Belfast School of Art
- Known for: Portraits, landscapes & animal paintings
- Style: Expressionism
- Partner: Helen Falloon
- Elected: Aosdana
- Website: https://x.com/basil_blackshaw

Basil Joseph Blackshaw HRUA, HRHA (July 1932 – 2 May 2016) was a Northern Irish artist specialising in animal paintings, portraits and landscapes and an Academician of the Royal Ulster Academy.

== Early life and education ==
Born in Glengormley, County Antrim, Northern Ireland and brought up in Boardmills in Lisburn, County Down, he was the son of a professional horse trainer, Englishman Samson Blackshaw and Edith Clayton from Tyrone. Blackshaw attended Methodist College Belfast and studied at Belfast College of Art (1948–1951) under Romeo Toogood. In 1950 Blackshaw joined two of his fellow students, Michael Stewart and Esther Crolly, as winners of the annual competition for the most outstanding students of the year, in the forty-eighth annual exhibition of the Ulster Arts Club.

In 1951 Blackshaw was awarded a scholarship to study in Paris by the Committee for the Encouragement of Music and the Arts. For a number of years after his graduation Blackshaw taught part-time at the Belfast School of Art, and he also designed sets for the Lyric Theatre, including Mary O'Malley's 1956 production of Jack Yeats La La Noo. In the early 1950s Blackshaw dated Cherith Boyd, a fellow art student at Belfast School of Art. He was to paint her portrait in 1958.

Blackshaw married the Australian artist Anna Ritchie in 1959 with whom he had a daughter in 1962. They divorced in 1972, after which he met his long-term partner Helen Falloon.

== Career ==
His home and studio was in County Antrim by Lough Neagh. He became well known for his country scenes including landscapes, farm buildings and horses, painted in an expressionist style.

He was initially acclaimed for his mastery of traditional approaches to painting. He continued to develop as an artist, becoming most highly regarded for his very loose gestural application of paint and a very distinctive and subtle use of colour. His paintings of such sports as horse racing and boxing made him particularly popular, but Blackshaw was also a talented portrait painter. Blackshaw trained greyhounds for around twelve years with moderate success.

Dolly, painting by Basil Blackshaw

Blackshaw's paintings are often figurative in form, but with a non-naturalistic palette which re-balances the composition in an expressionist, even abstract, way. His themes are very Irish and often rural; greyhounds, Irish Travellers, and the landscape. He also produced portraits including those of the playwright Brian Friel, novelist Jennifer Johnston, Nobel Peace Prize winner John Hume, and the poet Michael Longley. He has also designed posters for Derry's Field Day Theatre Company.

Blackshaw held a joint exhibition with Martin MacKeown at the Council for Encouragement of Music and the Art's Donegall Place gallery in 1952. In the following year three of Blackshaw's paintings were accepted for show at the Young Contemporaries Exhibition in London. Blackshaw's work was also shown at the inaugural show of the Association of Past Pupils and Staff at the Belfast College of Art in 1954 alongside T P Flanagan, Colin Middleton and Violet McAdoo.

He received his first solo show at the Belfast Museum and Art Gallery in January 1955 where he showed 36 paintings. In the following year Blackshaw showed in a solo exhibition of 48 monotone paintings and drawings at the Council for Encouragement of Music and the Arts gallery in Belfast where he was to return for a further show in 1961. The Arts Council of Northern Ireland presented a mid-career retrospective of his works in 1974. Amongst his many group shows were Four Ulster Painters at the Arnolfini Gallery in Bristol in 1965, and at the Watergate Gallery in Washington in 1974. He also showed at Rosc '88 in Dublin. In 1985, a fire destroyed his studio and many works within. He also battled alcoholism and won.

The Arts Council of Northern Ireland organised a major retrospective of his work in 1995, which travelled from Belfast to Dublin, Cork and many galleries in the United States. In 2001 he received the Glen Dimplex Award for a Sustained Contribution to the Visual Arts in Ireland. The Ulster Museum held a major retrospective of his work in 2002 and an extensive book was published by Eamonn Mallie in 2003. After many years of asking, Blackshaw agreed to be the subject of a documentary by Eamonn Maillie in 2015. The production An Edge of Society Man was first broadcast in 2016.

In 2006 Blackshaw's work was exhibited at the Centre Culturel Irlandais, Paris.

Blackshaw exhibited frequently with the Royal Ulster Academy from 1955 onwards. He was elected as an associate of the Royal Ulster Academy of the Arts in 1977 and elected an Academician in 1981. He had previously received the RUA silver medal for a non-member in 1976. Blackshaw won the Conor prize at the Royal Ulster Academy's one-hundred and first exhibition in 1982, for a Study for a portrait of David Hammond. Blackshaw also won an award at the one hundred and thirty-second show in 2015 for a rare equine sculpture.

Blackshaw debuted with the Irish Exhibition of Living Art in 1955, where he was to show at regular intervals after that. He also showed less frequently with Oireachtas throughout his career. In 1962 he had a solo show at Studio 25 in Belfast, and another at the Bell Gallery in 1970. Between 1973 and 1992 Blackshaw held six solo exhibitions at the Tom Caldwell Gallery in Dublin.

Blackshaw had a joint exhibition with Cherith McKinstry at Warrenpoint's Narrow Water Gallery in 1989. The Royal Hibernian Academy held a major retrospective of Blackshaw's work in 2012 on the occasion of his eightieth birthday. The exhibition included paintings chosen by Blackshaw and was curated by Dr Rian Coulter the curator of the F E McWilliam Gallery in Banbridge. Blackshaw's last work was a portrait of the Downpatrick broadcaster and photographer Bobbie Hanvey, which remains unfinished.

Blackshaw's personal art collection included work by Charles Brady, Neil Shawcross and Elizabeth Frink.

== Death and legacy ==
After a number of years of declining health, Basil Blackshaw died on 2 May 2016. He was survived by his partner Helen Falloon and his artist-daughter, Anya Waterworth. A funeral service was conducted at Roselawn Crematorium in Belfast where his model Jude Stephens delivered a eulogy. Blackshaw was buried in a wicker coffin in a humanist funeral, with the ceremony ending with the sounds of Bob Dylan's "Mr. Tambourine Man". The service was attended by many artists including Neil Shawcross, Jack Pakenham, David Crone, and Colin Davidson, in addition to many others from sporting life and the judiciary, as well as the actor Stephen Rea.

== Works in collections ==
- The Arts Council of Northern Ireland including:
  - The Last Walk
- The Arts Council of Ireland including:
  - Green Landscape (1980)
- The Ulster Museum
- The Hugh Lane Municipal Gallery, Dublin, including:
  - Niall's Pony
- Irish Museum of Modern Art, Permanent Collection including:
  - Female Nude
  - Anna on a Sofa
  - Windows I–IV

== See also ==
- List of Northern Irish artists
