= Kathleen Bridle =

British painter

- Born: 19 November 1897; Swalecliffe, Kent, England
- Died: 25 May 1989 (aged 91); Lakeside nursing home, Bellanaleck, Northern Ireland
- Resting place: Breandrum cemetery
- Education: Dublin Metropolitan School of Art, Royal College of Art
- Known for: watercolour landscapes, and oil portraits

Kathleen Mabel Bridle ARUA (19 November 1897 – 25 May 1989) was a British artist and teacher. She influenced Northern Irish artists such as William Scott and T.P. Flanagan.

== Early life and education ==
Kathleen Bridle was born at Swalecliffe in Kent on 19 November 1897. She was the middle child of the three daughters of an Irish lieutenant and coastguard, James Bridle, and a school teacher Janet Bridle (née Flower). Owing to her father's occupation, the family moved many times, living at Gravesend and Winterton-on-Sea before finally settling in Holyhead in 1913. Due to this the Bridle children were educated at home by their mother, but also at nearby schools. In 1910, Bridle attended a private school in Ramsgate, where her artistic talent was recognised. Bridle enrolled at the Dublin Metropolitan School of Art (DMSA) in 1915, moving in with her aunt in uncle at 60 Upper Rathmines Road. She won a teacher-training scholarship in 1917, which funded her remaining four years at the School. Bridle won a prize for pictorial design in 1917, and completed the certificate course in art by 1918. Bridle was awarded the Taylor scholarship in 1920, for her work based on the Greek myth Leda and the Swan. The scholarship allowed her to attend the Royal College of Art (RCA), London in 1921. Whilst there she became good friends with John Hunter, who gave her the nickname "Pindi", a name she kept for life. During this time she also became friends with the sculptor Henry Moore.

Bridle's first exhibited piece with the Royal Hibernian Academy (RHA) was the painting The Checkered Cloth in 1921, with her continuing to show with the RHA until 1939. The Mermaid, her enamel plaque which was completed under the guidance of Percy Oswald Reeves, was first shown at the Arts and Crafts Society of Ireland exhibition in 1921, then at the Galeries Barbazanges, Paris in 1922, and finally won first prize in its section at the Tailteann Games of 1924. At an exhibition of paintings by Dublin students in 1922, Bridle sold five landscapes. In 1923 Bridle received her teacher's diploma and a continuation scholarship. While still in London and attending the RCA, Bridle taught classes at night at the Elephant and Castle School of Art from 1924 to 1925. She won the George Clausen prize at the RCA for her 1924 portrait of Norah McGuinness.

== Artistic career ==
Bridle was employed briefly as a glass painter in the Dublin studio of Harry Clarke. Clarke introduced her to Seán O'Casey, which led to her taking over O'Casey's lodgings before his move to London around 1925 or 1926. She moved to Enniskillen, County Fermanagh in 1926, to take up a teaching post at the Enniskillen Technical School, whilst also teaching part-time at other schools such as the Collegiate Grammar School. Enniskillen would be her home for the rest of her life. Bridle continued to paint, and was a major influence on William Scott, giving him lessons in art, exposing him to modern artists through books and painting outdoors with him. Around 1927 she painted a portrait of Scott, and another portrait of Hunter was exhibited with the RHA the same year. In 1928, Bridle held her first solo exhibition in Enniskillen Town Hall, a show which included still life studies, portraits, and landscapes. An exhibition of Irish art at the DMSA featured her painting The Inner Harbour, Holyhead, and she was a contributor to the Olympic festival in 1928, in Amsterdam.

Bridle was one of the founders of the Ulster Unit in 1934, and was featured in their inaugural exhibition. She was a regular exhibitor with the Ulster Academy of Arts from 1931 to 1949, being elected an associate in 1935 and an honorary member in 1962. In 1936 she held an exhibition at John Magee's gallery in Belfast entitled Paintings of Fermanagh, Donegal, and Sligo, which included works such as Donegal Town (1936). During a visit to Italy in 1937, Bridle studied the frescoes of Giotto at the Arena chapel, Padua. She was amongst the artists featured in the touring exhibition of living Irish artists in 1943 to 1944, which was organised by the Council for the Encouragement of Music and the Arts, exhibiting with them until 1953. Bridle was very well travelled, visiting Europe extensively to study art, even touring Yugoslavia by bus in her 60s.

In 1947, Bridle's second major exhibition was held at the CEMA gallery, Belfast, featuring landscapes from Fermanagh and Anglesey. This was followed by a solo show at the Belfast Museum and Art Gallery in 1950, as well as being shown at the annual exhibitions of the Royal Ulster Academy from 1950 to 1979. The first Contemporary Ulster Group exhibition in Belfast in 1951 included five of her paintings. She was appointed to a full-time position at the Collegiate Grammar School in 1955. She was featured in the Contemporary Art Group exhibitions in Belfast in 1957 and 1958, and a solo exhibition of 13 of her paintings was held in the Piccolo gallery, Belfast in 1958. When Bridle retired from the Collegiate School in 1963, the Enniskillen committee of the Arts Council held an exhibition of her work in the town hall. She continued to teach part-time in the convent grammar school from 1964, helping to prepare students for examinations. A number of pieces of work from this period reflect on her travels to places such as New Zealand and French New Guinea. Bridle collaborated with her former pupils, Scott and T.P. Flanagan, in 1973 for an exhibition at the Arts Council gallery, Belfast. In 1986 she received a commission to paint The Cathedral from the Convent of Mercy for St Macartin's cathedral, Enniskillen.

== Influence and legacy ==
Bridle served as an art organiser in Fermanagh from 1945 to 1951, and encouraged art teachers to broaden the scope of their curriculum. In teaching T.P. Flanagan at Enniskillen Technical College until 1949, she inspired his interest in watercolour. Flanagan and Bridle painted together in Enniskillen, facing Lough Erne. To mark her 90th birthday, Flanagan presented her with a self-portrait. Her final public appearance was made in 1989, at the Ardowen Theatre, Enniskillen, for a viewing of David Hammond's film, Reminiscence by Kathleen Bridle. Bridle died at Lakeside nursing home, Bellanaleck, on 25 May 1989. She is buried in Breandrum cemetery.

A major retrospective of her work was held at the Fermanagh County Museum in 1998, which was toured to the Ulster Museum and the Armagh County Museum. Primarily Bridle was a watercolourist and landscape painter, but she also painted portraits in oils. Her 1948 self-portrait is held in The National Self-Portrait Collection of Ireland. The Ulster History Circle erected a blue plaque to Bridle on 15 November 2010, at her former home.
