= Colin Middleton =

British painter (1910–1983)

- Born: 29 January 1910; Belfast, Ireland
- Died: 23 December 1983 (aged 73); Belfast, Northern Ireland
- Education: Belfast School of Art
- Known for: painting, printmaking
- Style: surrealist, expressionist
- Elected: Royal Hibernian Academy, Royal Ulster Academy of Arts

Colin Middleton MBE (29 January 1910 – 23 December 1983) was a Northern Irish landscape artist, figure painter, and surrealist. Middleton's prolific output in an eclectic variety of modernist styles is characterised by an intense inner vision, augmented by his lifelong interest in documenting the lives of ordinary people. He has been described as "Ireland's greatest surrealist".

== Biography ==
Middleton was born in 1910 in Victoria Gardens in north Belfast, the only child of damask designer Charles Middleton. He attended the nearby Belfast Royal Academy until 1927 and then continued his studies with night classes at Belfast School of Art where he trained in design under the Cornish artist Newton Penprase. However Middleton found the college too traditional in outlook, as his first influence, his father, had been a follower of European Modernism, particularly the Impressionists.

== Career ==
Middleton showed his first works with the Ulster Academy of Arts in 1931, where he was to exhibit frequently until the late nineteen-forties. He first came to public attention with the inclusion of his works in the groundbreaking inaugural exhibition of the Ulster Unit at Locksley Hall, Belfast in December 1933. The Ulster Unit was a short-lived grouping of Ulster artists who took their inspiration from Paul Nash's Unit One formed earlier in the same year. Just two years thereafter In the same year Middleton married Maye McLain, also an artist and a domestic science teacher, who was to die only four years later. Middleton was also a poet and writer, whom along with his wife, was an active member of the Northern Drama League in the 1930s, with whom he designed sets. After the death of his first wife he destroyed all of his early paintings and entered a period of seclusion at his mother's home outside Belfast. Middleton became a follower of Van Gogh and also of James Ensor after viewing exhibitions in London and Belgium respectively. On his return to Ulster he began to experiment with styles derived from European Modernism, the antithesis to traditional academism. Throughout the thirties he was also a keen follower of Paul Nash, Tristam Hillier and Edward Wadsworth. After exposure to the works of Salvador Dali, Middleton declared himself "the only surrealist painter working in Ireland".

His work first appeared at the Royal Hibernian Academy in 1938 where he was to show intermittently until the final year of his life. 36 Arthur Street Belfast was the venue for a joint exhibition with the Czech artist Otakar Gregor, Joan Loewenthal and Sidney Smith in aid of the war effort at the end of 1940. Middleton completed three paintings immediately after the Belfast Blitz and the trauma of the events prevented him from working for six months before his work was included in a portfolio of lithographs published by the Ulster Academy in December 1941 to raise money for rebuilding the Ulster Children's and Women's Hospital which had been destroyed in the Blitz earlier in the year.

The Conspirators by Colin Middleton (1942). "Middleton's painting is dominated by the female form" (Dickon Hall)

Middleton's first solo exhibition was given by the Belfast Municipal Gallery and Museum in 1943. It was the first exhibition staged at the Gallery when they re-opened after the Belfast Blitz. At the time it was the largest one-person show the gallery had staged comprising one hundred fifteen works and it was also the first solo exhibition accorded to a local contemporary artist by the gallery. In an interview with Patrick Murphy in 1980, Middleton said that these paintings represented 'a first endeavour to harmonize the seemingly opposed and conflicting tendencies in human nature.' Dickon Hall says of this period that "Middleton's painting is dominated by the female form; it is only rarely that men appear in his work. In part these women reflect his experience of Belfast and the difficult conditions that so many lived through." This can be seen in the three female figures of The Poet's Garden (1943), and even more so in The Conspirators (1942), both of which featured in the 1943 exhibition. "The female form, pictorially and symbolically, becomes the landscape and the life force." The Belfast exhibition was followed by his first one-man show at the Grafton Gallery, Dublin in 1944. In the following year Middleton debuted at the Irish Exhibition of Living Art where he was to return on a number of occasions, particularly in the periods 1949–55 and 1963–71. In 1945 Middleton was married for the second time, to Kate Giddens, after both had been named co-respondents at the Belfast High Court a few months earlier, in civil servant Lionel P Barr's application for a decree-nisi. The suit was undefended and the couple had costs awarded against them. In the same year Middleton returned to the Belfast Museum for a solo exhibition arranged by the Council for the Encouragement of Music and the Arts. Middleton was a founding member of the Northern Ireland branch of the Artists International Association, who showed at the Belfast Municipal Gallery in spring 1945. Other members included Joan Loewenthal, Kathleen Crozier, Pat Hicking, Trude Neu, Sidney Smith, Nevill Johnston, George Campbell and Gerard Dillon.

Middleton's work was displayed in New York's Associated American Artists Galleries in 1947 with a selection of works chosen by the Dublin art critic Theodore Goodman that included paintings by his Northern contemporaries Dan O'Neill, George Campbell, Gerard Dillon and Patrick Scott. Middleton also retired from the family business that year to devote his time to painting. He had worked at the business since his Father's death in 1933. Middleton then took his wife and child to live and work on John Middleton Murry's Suffolk commune for a short period, before returning to Belfast in 1948. Although their new life in Suffolk was not a success as the family suffered from ill health, the experience of working the land was to prove a profound influence on Middleton's future work.

In 1949 Middleton showed his first works at the Oireachtas, where he was to return periodically until 1977. Upon their return from Suffolk, Middleton's wife sent Victor Waddington photos of his work whereupon Waddington came to represent Middleton for a period of five years, until the Gallery faced financial hardship in 1958. It was Waddington's patronage that enabled the Middleton family to live and work in Ardglass, County Down for four years from 1949, which Middleton later described as the happiest time of his life. When his works were displayed at Victor Waddington's Dublin gallery in that same year, it acted as a springboard that opened Middleton's work to an international audience. Group exhibitions in Boston and London followed in 1950 and 1951 respectively.

1952 saw Middleton's first solo show at London's Tooth Gallery where his work had been shown in the previous year. The Studio in review of that exhibition wrote that Middleton was:

"without doubt one of the few Irish painters who can claim more than local significance...His pictorial language has a poetic richness of colour, plangent and melodious, composed in strength of tones that give depth and presence."

In 1953, he moved to Bangor where he designed for the Marjory Mason's New Theatre. He later designed sets for the Circle Theatre and the Lyric Theatres, including the sets for a series of WB Yeats' plays in 1970, and Sean O'Casey's Red Roses for Me in 1972, both at the latter. In 1952 Middleton exhibited alongside Daniel O'Neill, Nevill Johnson, Gerard Dillon and Thurloe Connolly at the Tooth Galleries in London. Middleton began his career as an art teacher by the invitation of James Warwick who offered him a one year part-time post at the Belfast College of Art in 1954. That year Middleton showed forty-two works at the Belfast Municipal Gallery under the auspices of the Council For the Encouragement of Music and the Arts. In the following year he delivered full-time classes at the Coleraine Technical School, before becoming head of art at Friends' School, Lisburn in 1961 where he was to remain until 1970. Middleton lived on Plantation Avenue, Lisburn for nine years next door to fellow artist and pedagogue Dennis Osborne, who presented a portrait of Middleton at the annual exhibition of the Royal Ulster Academy in 1965.

A poet and musician, Middleton also produced murals, mosaics and posters. One such mural was commissioned for a house in Ballymena designed by the architect Noel Campbell in an international modernist style in 1951, and other works included a mosaic for a school in Lisburn, and a mural in a health clinic. Middleton showed in many group shows throughout the fifties including the Royal Academy in 1955, in addition to more solo exhibitions with the Victor Waddington Gallery in 1955, and his first showing at the Richie Hendricks Gallery in 1958. Of the Waddington exhibition the Dublin Magazine wrote: 'Apart from the brilliance of his paint, he has one rare quality in his inexhaustible capacity for wonder'.

Middleton showed in the Arts Council of Northern Ireland's gallery in 1965 with additional works at the Bell Gallery and his Bruges Series was shown at Alice Berger Hammerschlag's New Gallery upon his return from a Belgian trip in 1966. The Arts Council of Northern Ireland suffered an extensive fire at their storage facility in south Belfast in autumn 1967 which decimated their collection of contemporary art and theatre costumes. Losses included several of Middleton's paintings, in addition to the works of many other leading Ulster artists such as William Conor and TP Flanagan. Middleton was amongst the prizewinners at the Arts Council of Northern Ireland's 4th Open Painting Exhibition in 1968. In the same year John Hewitt curated a joint exhibition of his paintings with TP Flanagan, at the Herbert Art Gallery in Coventry.

The Arts Council hosted a joint retrospective of Middleton's work in co-operation with the Scottish Arts Council in 1970. A major retrospective was to follow at the Ulster Museum and the Hugh Lane Municipal Gallery of Modern Art Dublin in 1976. Comprising almost three hundred exhibits, the show was accompanied by a monograph written by Middleton's lifelong friend, the patron and poet John Hewitt. Hewitt would later bequeath his art collection, including several of Middleton's paintings to the Ulster Museum.

The Royal Mail used Middleton's painting of Slieve na Brock in the Mourne Mountains to commemorate the Ulster '71 exhibition in a series of postage stamps that also featured the work of Tom Carr and TP Flanagan. In 1972 Middleton toured extensively with his wife visiting Australia for two months and showing his works from the trip at the McClelland International Galleries on Belfast's Lisburn Road the following year. In 1973 he also visited Barcelona and later showed a series of surrealist works inspired by the two trips at the Tom Caldwell Gallery in Belfast.

Middleton lived for the last twelve years of life in Bangor, County Down.

== Death and legacy ==
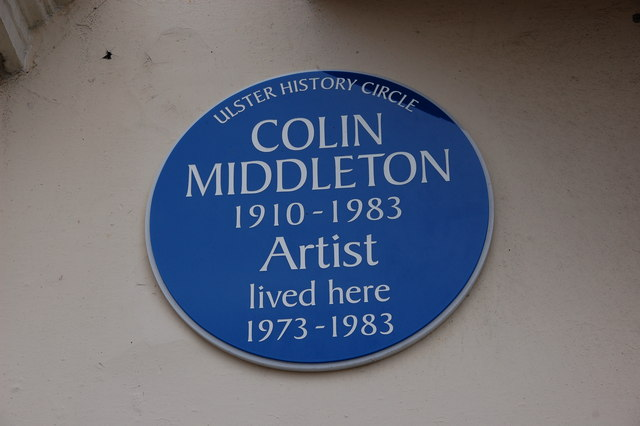
Ulster History Circle's blue plaque at Colin Middleton's former home at 6 Victoria Road, Bangor, County Down

Colin Middleton died of leukaemia in Belfast City Hospital in December 1983. He was survived by his wife Kate, their daughter and a step-daughter. Middleton's son predeceased him by a year. Christie's of London were entrusted with the sale of his studio works in 1985. The works were displayed before auction in both Dublin and Belfast during August of that year. In 2005 the Ulster History Circle unveiled a commemorative blue plaque at Middleton's former home on Victoria Road in Bangor.

In the 1970s the Arts Council of Northern Ireland commissioned a documentary film portrait of Middleton entitled Trace of a Thorn, which was written and narrated by the Belfast poet Michael Longley. Middleton's works can be seen in many private and public collections including the Ulster Museum, Irish Museum of Modern Art, and the Hugh Lane Municipal Gallery, National Gallery of Ireland, National Gallery of Victoria, Herbert Art Gallery and Oxford University.

In September 2023, 'eighty years since the ground-breaking exhibition Colin Middleton held at the Belfast Museum and Art Gallery, now the Ulster Museum, and forty years after his death,' the Ulster Museum held a new exhibition of his works, celebrating his association with Belfast, the city of which he said, "I belong here as I never belonged anywhere else in the country." This exhibition brought together 'works held in the public collection with those from private lenders [to provide a] full picture of this artist's talent and life.'

== Awards ==
Middleton won the Royal Dublin Society's Taylor Scholarship worth £50 in 1932, and two further awards of £10 in 1933. In 1935 Middleton was elected associate of the Ulster Academy, inducted alongside Helen Brett, Kathleen Bridle, Patrick Marrinan, Maurice Wilks, Romeo Toogood and William St. John Glenn, and in 1948 he became an elected Academician at the same.

In 1968, he was appointed MBE in the Queen's birthday honours list, and in 1969 Middleton was elected an associate at the Royal Hibernian Academy with full membership conferred just a year later. He was awarded an honorary Master of Arts degree from Queen's University, Belfast in 1972. The Arts Council of Northern Ireland granted Middleton a substantial subsistence award in 1970 which was to cover two years enabling him to retire from teaching to concentrate on painting full-time. In the same year the Arts Council of Northern Ireland also commissioned him to paint a portrait of their director, Kenneth Jamison.

Critical Biography

- Hewitt, John (1976), Colin Middleton, Belfast: Arts Council/An Chomhairle Ealaíon and the Arts Council of Northern Ireland

== See also ==
- List of Northern Irish artists
