= John Luke (artist) =

Irish artist (1906–1975)

- Born: January 19, 1906; 4 Lewis Street, Belfast
- Died: 1975 (aged 68–69); Belfast
- Education: Slade School of Art, London

John Luke (19 January 1906 – 4 February 1975) was an Irish artist.

He was born in Belfast at 4 Lewis Street. The fifth of eight children of James Luke and his wife Sarah, originally from Ahoghill. He attended the Hillman Street National School and in 1920 went to work at the York Street Flax Spinning Company. He went on soon after to become a riveter at the Workman, Clark shipyard and whilst working there he enrolled in evening classes at the Belfast College of Art.

He excelled at the college under the tutelage of Seamus Stoupe and Newton Penpraze. His contemporaries included Romeo Toogood, Harry Cooke Knox, George MacCann, and Colin Middleton. In 1928, he won the coveted Dunville Scholarship which enabled him to attend the Slade School of Art in London, where he studied painting and sculpture under the celebrated Henry Tonks, who greatly influenced his development as a draughtsman.

Luke remained at the Slade School until 1930, in which year he won the Robert Ross Scholarship. On leaving the Slade he stayed in London, intent on establishing himself in the art world. For a time he shared a flat with fellow-Ulsterman F.E. McWilliam (1909–1992), and enrolled as a part-time student of Walter Bayes at the Westminster School of Art to study wood-engraving. He began to exhibit his work and in October 1930 showed two paintings, The Entombment and Carnival, in an exhibition of contemporary art held at Leger Galleries. The latter composition, depicting a group of masked merry-makers, was singled out by the influential critic, P.G. Konody of the Daily Mail (3 October 1930), as 'one of the most attractive features of the exhibition'. But the economic climate was deteriorating and a year later, at the end of 1933, he was driven back to Belfast by the recession. He remained in Belfast, apart from a time during the Second World War when he went to Killylea, County Armagh.

== Technique and Style ==
Luke painted in the style known as Regionalism (art), whose main proponents were Thomas Hart Benton (painter), Grant Wood, John Steuart Curry and Harry Epworth Allen. John Luke's painting technique was painstakingly slow, his manner precise. 'I'm afraid I'm very much a one job man,' he once wrote to John Hewitt, continuing: 'my strength lies in making the most of one job at a time, in sustained thought and effort, to bring it to the highest level of organisation and completeness I desire: the other way I lead to disintegrate in looseness and frustration with its inevitable weakness.' The precision characteristic of his work was manifested, too, in his appearance and personal manner. Dark haired, in stature he was erect and spare of build. Always tidy, his clothes brushed, his hair short, he was, in Hewitt's words, 'not at all close to the romantic stereotype of the artist'.

== Inspiration ==
Apart from his work as a practicing artist, he taught from time to time in the Belfast College of Art. Although principally a painter, throughout his career he occasionally made sculptures, such as the Stone Head, Seraph of c. 1940 (Ulster Museum). He won the Robert Ross Prize at the Slade School for sculpture. He was also interested in philosophical theories of art. In the 1930s, as John Hewitt has recorded, topical books such as Roger Fry's Vision and Design, Clive Bell's Art and R.H. Wilenski's Modern Movement in Art directed his thinking.

== Exhibitions ==
From the late 1930s until 1943, when he produced Pax, there was a gap in his output, occasioned, no doubt, by his move to County Armagh in order to escape Belfast after the Blitz. In 1946 he held his first one-man exhibition at the Belfast Museum and Art Gallery, and this was followed two years later by a similar show, held under the aegis of CEMA, nearby at number 55A Donegal Place. He also exhibited at the Ulster Academy of Arts in 1936 and 1940.

In 1950, to celebrate the Festival of Britain the following year, he was commissioned to paint in the City Hall, Belfast, a mural representing the history of the city, a work which brought his name to the attention of a wider audience. In later years, other commissions followed for murals in the Masonic Hall, Rosemary Street, 1956, and the College of Technology at Millfield in the 1960s. He also carved in relief coats of arms for the two Governors of Northern Ireland, Lords Wakehurst, 1959, and Erskine of Rerrick, 1965. He was, too, a member of the Royal Ulster Academy.

His sculpture of Saint Patrick is held at the Ulster Folk Museum.

== Later life ==
John Luke died in Belfast on 4 February 1975, a month into his sixty-ninth year. He was unmarried.

A retrospective exhibition of his work was held, in association with the Arts Councils of Ireland, in the Ulster Museum in 1978, and was accompanied by a short monograph on his life and career written by John Hewitt. Since that time his reputation has grown, his loss rekindling memories in many of his former students of a fastidiously arranged life-room in the College of Art, his coat folded and his soft, gentle manner of instruction.

== About His Art ==
John Luke presented an enigmatic view to the world. Reserved by nature and opinionated, he lived a very private life. His prowess as a draughtsman was evident in all he did and was seen in an early Self-portrait (Ulster Museum), done in pencil in about 1927. His sense of purpose is complete, his 'line' precise, taut and economical; qualities which can be seen, too, in another Self-portrait of the same time, but done in oils (Ulster Museum). This concern for line is evident also in The Lustre Jug, 1934, where he has also taken delight in conveying the surface qualities of the various items in the composition. This picture was shown in the memorable Ulster Unit exhibition, held in Belfast in 1934. Much of his inspiration, especially with regard to his interest in tempera painting, being drawn from the early masters of the Italian Renaissance such as Piero della Francesca and Botticelli.

In the mid and late 1930s Luke's preoccupation with formal structures began to assume a greater importance in his work. One of the first paintings in which this change is noticeable is Connswater Bridge, 1934, in which large masses have been juxtaposed boldly one with another in a highly stylized manner, yet the clarity of the actual scene is retained. But two years later, in 1936, when he painted The Bridge (which seems to have been inspired by André Derain's masterpiece The Turning Road, L’Estaque), his technique had matured to a degree which, perhaps, he never surpassed. Here his formalism, expressed in flowing and rhythmic lines and shapes, is carefully matched to the undulating landscape and the colours are bright, the mood optimistic. But this buoyancy was short-lived and by the following year, in The Fox, currently being exhibited in the Ulster Museum, his mood had changed and a seriousness of purpose began to emerge which eventually overwhelmed him. The strict stylization seen in the latter composition became his hallmark for more than a decade, during which time he nevertheless produced some of his most memorable pictures, including The Road to the West, 1944, and The Old Callan Bridge, 1945. In The Road to the West he is still at the height of his powers, his treatment of the landscape being entirely original, a sense of discovery still evident, the whole in keeping with the mood of the times. The Callan Bridge picture presents him in an unusually light-hearted state of mind, although one still senses that the encroaching dark colours of the hedgerows betray a metaphorical colouring of mood.

By the late 1940s and early 1950s Luke had become obsessed with technique in pictures such as The Three Dancers, 1945, Northern Rhythm, 1946, The Dancer and the Bubble, 1947, and The Rehearsal, 1950. The murals which he executed in the early fifties in the City Hall and Rosemary Street Masonic Hall were to be his last paintings and thereafter, apart from the uncompleted mural in the Millfield Technical College (building demolished 2002) and the coats-of-arms carved for the Governors of Northern Ireland, he did little new work.

Luke was a quiet, somewhat withdrawn figure. His Spartan lifestyle sapped his energy by the mid 1950s and suffered a crisis of confidence as the post-war world took shape and the inexorable advance of Modern painting overwhelmed the traditional values which he advocated for.

== Books ==
John Luke (artist) 1906-1975 (Arts Council/An Chomhairle Ealaíon and the Arts Council of Northern Ireland, 1978)

Northern Rhythm: The Art of John Luke (1906-1975), Joseph McBrinn, National Museums Northern Ireland, 2012.
