= Cherith McKinstry =

Irish painter and sculptor (1928–2004)

- Born: Cherith Rosalind Boyd; 4 March 1928; Powick, Worcestershire
- Died: 2004 (aged 75–76); Lisburn, County Antrim
- Education: Belfast School of Art
- Known for: Painting
- Spouse: Robert McKinstry

Cherith McKinstry (4 March 1928 – October 2004) was an Irish painter and sculptor.

== Biography ==
Cherith Boyd was born in Powick, Worcestershire to Lilian Goodwin, a nurse, and Arthur Boyd a psychiatric doctor. She was the middle child of three girls. When Cherith was three years old her father moved the family back to his native Ulster where he was to take a post as superintendent at Antrim Mental Hospital. Boyd was taught by a governess until the age of ten, when along with her older sister she was enrolled as a boarder at Ashleigh House in Belfast. At school she befriended Florence McKinstry whose brother she would later marry. Her father died in 1939 and her mother was appointed matron at Ashleigh House in the same year. When World War II broke-out the students were evacuated to Learmount Castle in the Sperrins, where Boyd contracted polio which was to affect her gait for the rest of her life.

Her art teacher Romilly Seymour recommended that she train at Belfast College of Art, where she was to meet Basil Blackshaw and T.P. Flanagan. She maintained a lifelong friendship with Blackshaw. Boyd dated Blackshaw in the early 1950s and painted her portrait in 1958. She studied under Romeo Toogood between 1950 and 1953. Boyd was presented a prize for the best painting and drawing student of 1951 at the opening of the Ulster Arts Club's annual winter exhibition. In 1954 Boyd was the first female recipient of a Council for the Encouragement of Music and the Arts travel scholarship worth £75, which she used to study in Italy and France. Boyd was particularly interested in studying Florentine sculptors and their modern counterparts. A Roman Scene was later one of 145 works selected from a thousand submissions for an exhibition at Liverpool's Walker Art Gallery in 1957. Boyd exhibited with eight recent graduates at the YMCA Hall in Belfast in 1954. Exhibitors included Raymond Piper, TP Flanagan, Basil Blackshaw and Markey Robinson. In the same year Boyd contributed a sculpture to the British Industries Fair at Earl's Court, one of six Ulster artists to show work, including Mercy Hunter, George MacCann and Dan O'Neill. She taught for a time at Whitehead High School and also at Belfast Art College.

Boyd met her future husband at Belfast School of Art, Robert McKinstry, an architect and lecturer, whom she married in 1958. She later bore three sons. Cherith held an attic studio at their Rugby Road home until 1968 when the McKinstrys settled at Chrome Hill in Lisburn where Cherith had a studio attached to the house.

McKinstry's earliest works were sculptures which was often evident in her figurative paintings of the 1960s. Her early paintings were often imbued with a sense of suffering and inhumanity as well as endurance, often focusing on Christian interpretations of these themes. She was later to work in a more abstract manner. Her works were influenced by the Dublin painters Patrick Pye and Charles Brady. McKinstry's first solo exhibition was hosted by the Council For the Encouragement of Music and the Arts in Belfast in 1962. After an absence of four years in which time she had been raising her three sons, McKinstry held a solo exhibition at the New Gallery on the Grosvenor Road, Belfast, in 1967.

McKinstry accepted several large-scale commissions including the Stations of the Cross for St. McNissi Church at Magherahoney which were previewed at the Bell Gallery in 1968. and Students a mural, for the main staircase at Queens University Belfast in 1986. Her largest works were the six canvas ceiling panels she created for the Grand Opera House in Belfast, part of a renovation conducted by her husband in 1979. The two largest panels measured 12 ft by 6 ft. To allow for their creation the McKinstrys cleared their living room of furniture for a period of around a year. Basil Blackshaw assisted McKinstry to stretch the canvases. Before their installation the paintings were displayed alongside preparatory plans and sketches in Towards the Opera House ceiling paintings, an exhibition at the Ulster Museum. In 1975 McKinstry showed a portrait of the Olympic pentathlete Mary Peters at the Arts Council of Northern Ireland Gallery. Studies for a 1974 private commission Christ Crucified were shown as part of McKinstry's solo show at the Octogon Gallery that autumn. Her works were shown in a solo exhibition at the Kays Gallery in Derry in September 1977.

In 1980 McKinstry showed a series of new works in a two person show at the Keys Gallery in Derry, with Charles Brady, where they were to return three years later. McKinstry was the recipient of a £5000 subsistence award from the Arts Council of Northern Ireland in 1983.

McKinstry showed on numerous occasions with the Irish Exhibition of Living Art after her first showing in 1961, with the Figurative Art Group, and through the 1990s with the Royal Hibernian Academy. In 1987 she received an Honorary MA from Queen's University. From 1973 onwards, McKinstry was a frequent exhibitor at the Royal Ulster Academy of Arts annual shows, where she was elected as an Associate member in 1981. The Ulster Museum hosted a solo exhibition of her work in 1980, followed by another at the Gordon Gallery, Derry in 1991. The Narrow Water Gallery in Warrenpoint hosted a joint exhibition of her work with Basil Blackshaw in the summer of 1989.

== Death and legacy ==
Cherith McKinstry died in October 2004. She was survived by her husband Robert, and her three sons, Simon, Leo and Jason. Jorgensen Fine Art in Dublin hosted a retrospective of McKinstry's work in 2006. The exhibition was opened by James Hamilton, the Duke of Abercorn.

McKinstry's works can be seen in various public and private collections including the Ulster Museum, Derby Museum and Art Gallery, Queen's University, Belfast, Irish Linen Centre and Lisburn Museum, and the Northern Ireland Civil Service.
