= Thomas Carr (artist) =

British painter (1909–1999)

Thomas James Carr
- Born: 21 September 1909; Belfast
- Died: 17 February 1999 (aged 89); Norwich
- Education: Slade School of Art
- Known for: Painting, art education
- Spouse(s): Stella Robbins (m. 1935–1995, her death); 3 daughters

Thomas James Carr OBE (21 September 1909 – 17 February 1999) was an Irish artist who was associated with the Euston Road School in the 1930s and had a long career as a painter of domestic scenes and landscapes.

== Biography ==
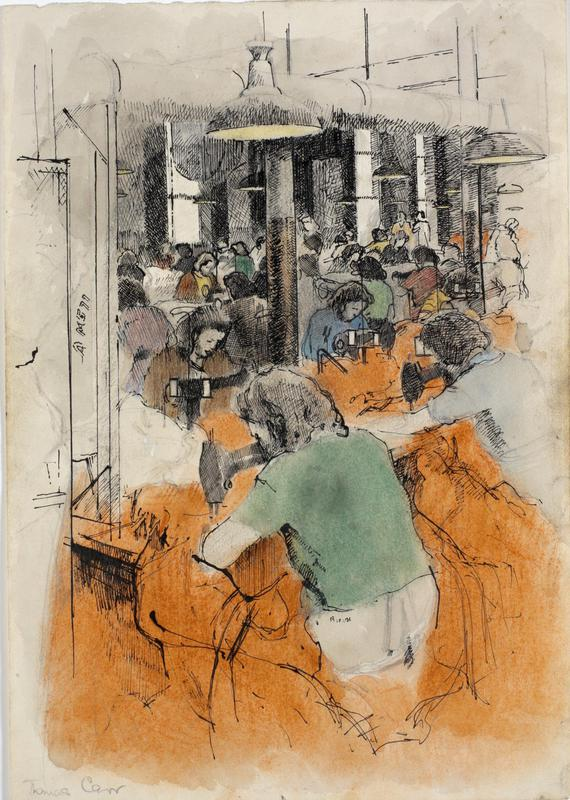
Sketch for Making Coloured Parachutes (Art.IWM ART LD 4957)

Carr was born in Belfast to a well-to-do family and attended Oundle School where his art masters included E.M.O'R. Dickey and Christopher Perkins. In 1927 Carr moved to London where he studied under Henry Tonks at the Slade School of Art. After two years at the Slade, Carr moved to Italy and spent a year in Settignano near Florence. Upon returning to London, Carr established himself as a well-regarded painter of domestic scenes. Although essentially a realist painter, Carr was included in the 1934 Objective Abstractionists exhibition at Zwemmer's Gallery. In 1937, Carr shared an exhibition with Victor Pasmore and Claude Rogers at the Storran Gallery and subsequently became associated with the representational style of the Euston Road school. Starting in 1940, at Wildenstein's gallery, Carr held a series of one-man exhibitions at various galleries including at the Leicester Galleries, the Redfern Gallery and also at Agnew's.

In 1939, Carr returned to Northern Ireland and settled in Newcastle, County Down where he spent the Second World War. During the War, Carr received a small number of commissions from the War Artists' Advisory Committee to depict parachute manufacture and the Short Sunderland flying-boats being built at the Short Brothers factory in Belfast.

After the War, Carr taught at the Belfast College of Art and moved to Belfast in 1955. After the death of his wife in 1995, Carr moved to Norfolk to be nearer one of his three daughters and her family. Carr continued to paint into old age, and tended to concentrate on landscape painting. A large retrospective exhibition of Carr's work was held in Belfast and then Dublin in 1985.

Carr was a regular exhibitor at the Royal Academy and was a member of the Royal Ulster Academy, the New English Art Club, the Royal Watercolour Society and was an honorary member of the Royal Hibernian Academy. Carr's work was among 49 artworks included in a selection of works from Ulster Artists hosted at the Leeds Playhouse Gallery in 1976. Queen's University awarded him an honorary doctorate in 1991. For his services to art in Northern Ireland, Carr was awarded the MBE in 1974 and received an OBE in 1993.
