= F. E. McWilliam =

Northern Irish artist

F. E. McWilliam CBE RA
- Born: 30 April 1909; Banbridge, County Down, Ireland
- Died: 13 May 1992 (aged 83); London, England
- Education: Belfast College of Art, Slade School of Fine Art
- Known for: Sculpture in stone, wood and bronze
- Movement: Surrealism
- Website: femcwilliam.com

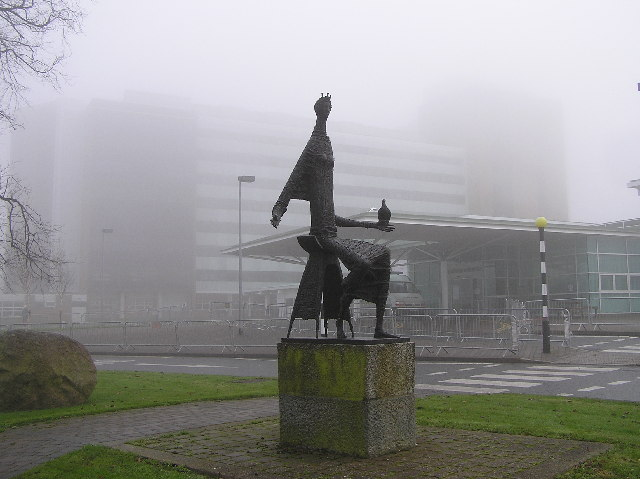
'Princess Macha' at Altnagelvin Area Hospital, Derry

Frederick Edward McWilliam CBE RA (30 April 1909 – 13 May 1992), was a Northern Irish surrealist sculptor. He worked chiefly in stone, wood and bronze.

== Biography ==
McWilliam was born in Banbridge, County Down, Ireland, the son of Dr William McWilliam, a local general practitioner. Growing up in Banbridge had a great influence on his work. He made references to furniture makers such as Carson the Cooper and Proctors in his letters to his friend, Marjorie Burnett.

He attended Campbell College in Belfast and later attended Belfast College of Art from 1926. After 1928, he continued to study at the Slade School of Fine Art in London. He originally intended to become a painter, but influenced by A.H. Gerrard, Head of Sculpture at the Slade and by Henry Moore whom he met there, he turned to sculpture. He received the Robert Ross Leaving Scholarship which enabled him and his wife (Beth Crowther) to travel to Paris where he visited the studio of Brancusi.

During the first year of the Second World War, he joined the Royal Air Force and was stationed in England for four years where he was engaged in interpreting aerial reconnaissance photographs. He was then posted to India. While there he taught art in the Hindu Art School in New Delhi.

After his return from India, he taught for a year at the Chelsea School of Art. He was then invited by A. H. Gerrard to teach sculpture at the Slade. He continued in this post until 1968.

The 1950s saw him receive many commissions including the Four Seasons Group for the Festival of Britain exhibition in 1951. A major commission (1957) was Princess Macha for Altnagelvin Hospital, Derry.

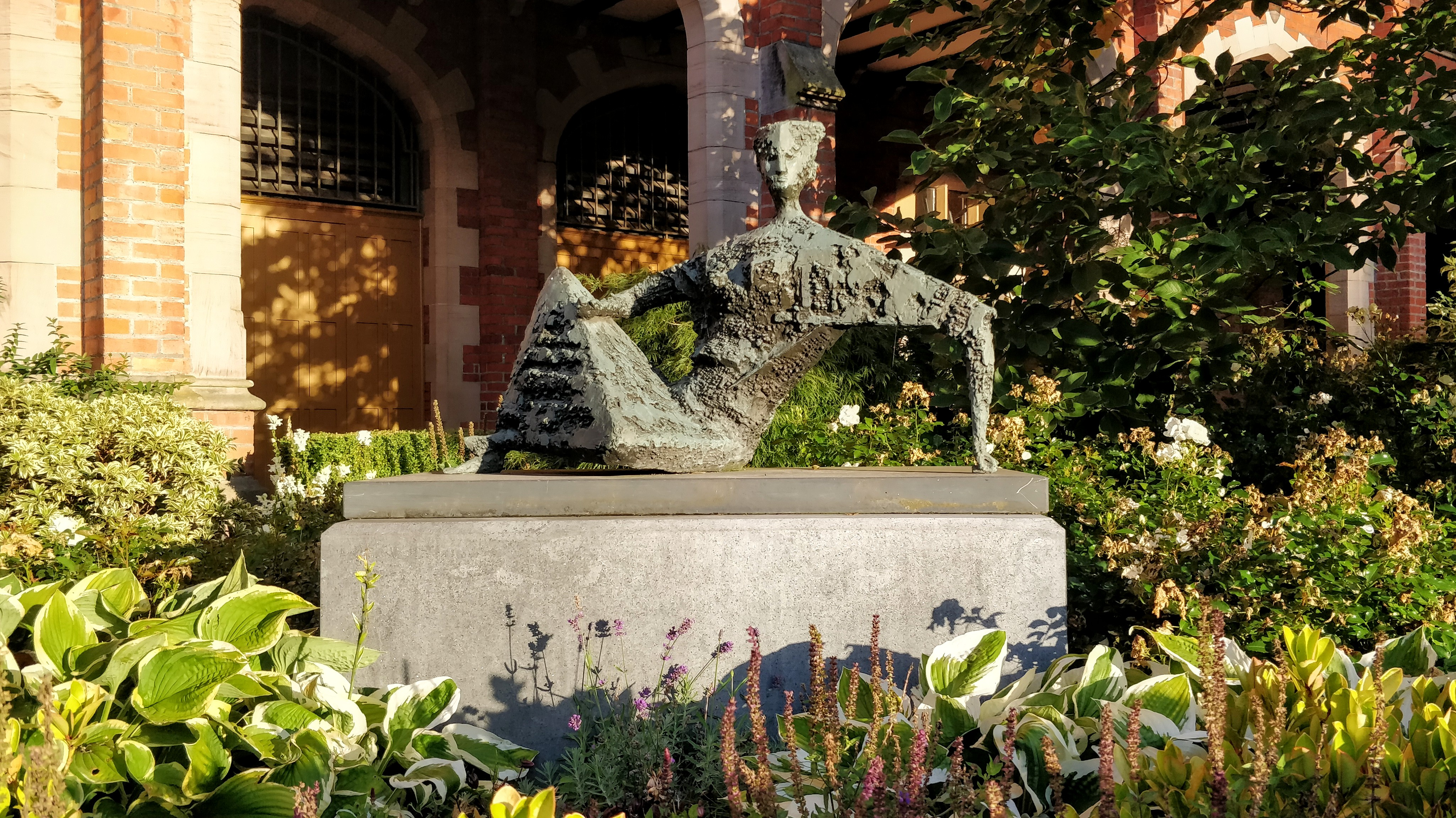
Reclining Figure, located in the grounds of Queen's University Belfast

On 24 April 1959 he was elected to the Royal Academy. On 21 March 1963 he resigned from in protest at the Hanging Committee's rejection of a William Gear painting, also resigning from the London Group and not participating in future mixed exhibitions. On 7 December 1989 he was re-elected as a Senior R.A.

During the Northern Ireland Troubles he produced a series of bronzes (1972–73) known as Women of Belfast in response to the Abercorn Restaurant bombing.

In 1964 he was awarded an Honorary Doctor of Letters from Queen's University Belfast. In 1966 he was appointed CBE and in 1971 he won the Oireachtas Gold Medal. McWilliam is represented in many public collections, including MOMA (New York) and Tate Britain. In 1984 the National Self-Portrait Gallery purchased a McWilliam self-portrait amongst acquisitions from fellow Northerners Brian Ballard, Brian Ferran and TP Flanagan.

The Arts Council of Northern Ireland organised a retrospective of his work in 1981 and a second retrospective was shown at the Tate Gallery in 1989 for his 80th birthday.

He continued carving up to his death. He died of cancer in London on 13 May 1992.

McWilliam's style of work consists of sculptures of the human form contorted into strange positions, often described as modern and surreal.

In September 2009 Banbridge District Council opened a gallery and studio dedicated to the work of and named after McWilliam.

== See also ==
- List of Northern Irish artists
