= William Scott (artist) =

British artist (1913–1989)

- William Scott in 1959 (during a visit by Mark Rothko photo by James Scott)
- Born: 15 February 1913; Greenock, Scotland
- Died: 28 December 1989 (aged 76); Coleford, Somerset, England
- Known for: Painting
- Movement: Abstract
- Awards: Commander of the Order of the British Empire; Royal Academician

William Scott CBE RA (15 February 1913 – 28 December 1989) was a prominent abstract painter from Northern Ireland, known for his themes of still life, landscape and female nudes. He is the most internationally celebrated of 20th-century Ulster painters. His early life was the subject of the film Every Picture Tells a Story, made by his son James Scott.

William Scott was born in Greenock, Scotland, in 1913. In 1924, his family moved to his father's home town of Enniskillen in Northern Ireland where Scott soon began art classes with a local teacher, Kathleen Bridle. In 1928 he enrolled at the Belfast School of Art, moving to London three years later to take up a place at the Royal Academy Schools, initially in the sculpture department, later moving to painting. He married fellow student Mary Lucas in May 1937 and soon after they travelled to Italy and France, establishing an art school in Pont-Aven with the painter Geoffrey Nelson.

In 1938, Scott exhibited at the Paris Salon d'Automne, and was elected Sociétaire that same year. Days before the outbreak of the Second World War, the Scotts left France, moving firstly to Dublin and then to London before eventually settling in Somerset. Scott joined the army in July 1942, serving firstly with the Royal Army Ordnance Corps and then as a lithographic draughtsman with the Royal Engineers. Although not demobilized until January 1946, he continued to paint and to exhibit during the war both in group and solo shows.

On leaving the army, Scott took up the position of Senior Painting Master at the Bath Academy of Art, at Corsham Court, Wiltshire. During the decade in which he taught at Corsham, Scott made frequent trips to Cornwall and became good friends with many of the St Ives Group of artists. He also continued to dedicate much of his time to his own painting, which, at that date, was concerned mainly with the theme of still-life. A number of these works were shown at two one-man exhibitions at the Leicester Galleries in London, the first in 1948 and the second in 1951.

1951 was the year of the Festival of Britain: Scott was one of the sixty artists invited by the Arts Council to exhibit as part of the celebrations. Around this time, Scott's work moved closer to non-figuration and his first one-man show at the Hanover Gallery in London, which opened in June 1953, included a number of, loosely, abstract paintings. That same year, an extended visit to North America resulted in friendships with New York based artists including Rothko and de Kooning. One of the first British artists to be aware of Abstract Expressionism, the work he saw in America made Scott aware of how much his painting was, and would continue to be, tied to a European artistic tradition.

By 1956, Scott's success as an artist, both nationally and internationally, allowed him to give up full-time teaching, although he would remain interested in, and involved with, art school education for the rest of his life. In 1958 he represented Great Britain at the Venice Biennale, one of many occasions on which his work was chosen by the British Council to be exhibited abroad. At the 1961 São Paulo Bienal, Scott won the Sanbra (International Critics) Purchase Prize.

The 1960s saw retrospective exhibitions in Zurich, Hannover, Berne and Belfast. There were also major shows in London, Tokyo, Paris, Brussels, Copenhagen, Oslo and Rotterdam. In 1963 Scott was invited to take up the offer a 12-month residency in Berlin by the Ford Foundation. In 1966, in recognition of his contribution to the arts, he was made a CBE (Commander of the Order of the British Empire) in the New Year's Honours List; the investiture took place on 15 March. He would subsequently receive honorary doctorates from the Royal College of Art in London, Queen's University Belfast and Trinity College Dublin.

In 1972, the Tate Gallery mounted a major retrospective which included more than 125 paintings dating from 1938 onwards. The following year Scott toured India, Australia and Mexico as a British Council lecturer. Having been made an Associate member of the Royal Academy in 1977, in 1984 Scott was elected a Royal Academician. The following year, his son James Scott made the film, Every Picture Tells A Story – about the artist's early life – for Channel 4 Television. A 1986 retrospective exhibition at the Ulster Museum in Belfast toured to both Dublin and Edinburgh.

On the 28th December 1989, after living with Alzheimer's disease for several years, Scott died at his home in Somerset. Posthumous shows have ranged from a 1998 survey at the Irish Museum of Modern Art to the 2016 exhibition at The Verey Gallery, Eton College.

He himself said: "I am an abstract artist in the sense that I abstract. I cannot be called non-figurative while I am still interested in the modern magic of space, primitive sex forms, the sensual and the erotic, disconcerting contours, the things of life."

== Exhibitions ==
Scott represented Britain in 1958 at the Venice Biennale. He exhibited at the Hanover Gallery in London, at the Martha Jackson Gallery in New York, Italy, Switzerland, West Germany, France, the Kasahara Gallery in Japan, Canada and Australia, at the Dawson Gallery, Dublin, as well as Belfast. Retrospectives of his work were held at the Tate Gallery, London in 1972, in Edinburgh, Dublin and Belfast in 1986, by the Irish Museum of Modern Art, Dublin in 1998 and the Jerwood Gallery in 2013. In 2025 there was an exhibition of three of his large works at the Museum of Somerset in Taunton. They were in part selected to indicate his interaction with Mark Rothko.

== Selected works ==
- Still Life With Orange Note (1970), Oil on canvas, Arts Council of Northern Ireland collection
- Cornish Harbour (1951), Lithograph, Museum of New Zealand Te Papa Tongarewa collection
- Fish (1951), Lithograph, Museum of New Zealand Te Papa Tongarewa collection
- Portrait of a girl (1948), Lithograph, Museum of New Zealand Te Papa Tongarewa collection
- Girl Seated at a Table (1938), formerly owned by David Bowie
