= Royal Ulster Academy =

The Royal Ulster Academy (RUA) has existed in one form or another since 1879. It started life then, as The Belfast Ramblers' Sketching Club drawn from the staff of Marcus Ward & Co who held their first show in Ward's Library on Botanic Avenue in 1881. In 1890, it became The Belfast Art Society; later, in 1930, its name was changed to "The Ulster Academy of Arts" and Sir John Lavery was elected its first President; finally, in 1950, King George VI conferred the title The Royal Ulster Academy of Arts upon the institution.

The academy has as a primary mission "to promote and support the visual arts in Northern Ireland." Members includes artists, sculptors, printmakers, architects as well as invited other interested parties.

There are five distinct categories of members: Academicians: Senior Academicians: Associate Academicians: Honorary Academicians.

After many years of falling standards at the Annual exhibition Anne Crookshank, Curator of Art at the Ulster Museum, pruned the show down to just thirty-seven works for the 1958 show. By 1970 the organisation was floundering, and no student or avant-garde artist would have been interested in showing with them. When Patric Stevenson took the President's role in 1970 he personally oversaw the stabilisation of its finances and preservation of its records. Standards began to improve after T P Flanagan took the reins in 1978 as he held considerable influence over his students at the Belfast College of Art, in encouraging participation from younger and more adventurous artists. Others such as Raymond Piper, Neil Shawcross, and later Joe McWilliams and Bob Sloan did similarly. During David Evan's presidency from 1983 to 1993 the academy's Annual show was held at Queen's University, Belfast before returning to the Ulster Museum under Rowel Friers.

Today the Royal Ulster Academy of Arts (RUA) is a flourishing artists' organization. Many of Ireland's most distinguished artists are exhibiting members of the academy.

Its Annual Exhibition is the largest, open art exhibition in Northern Ireland, attracting many hundreds of artist entrants from Ireland and elsewhere.

Presidents of the academy have included Sir John Lavery R.A, Morris Harding, William Conor, Mercy Hunter, T.P. Flanagan, Joe McWilliams and Rita Duffy. Academicians have included Basil Blackshaw, Victor Sloan, T.P. Flanagan, Graham Gingles, Jean Duncan, Neil Shawcross and Jack Pakenham.
