= Renée Bickerstaff =

Irish artist (1904–1983)

Renée Bickerstaff HRUA (1904–1983) was a self-taught Ulster artist, a founding member and treasurer of the Ulster Society of Women Artists. She was also the honorary secretary of the Royal Ulster Academy of Arts for a number of years.

== Biography ==
Renée Doreen Bickerstaff was born in 1904. Little is known about her early life or education. She was a skilled botanical painter and painted still-life and landscape. She held a particular interest in ecclesiastical buildings.

Bickerstaff debuted at the Belfast Art Society in 1928 with four works. She exhibited with the successor organisations, the Ulster Academy and subsequently with the Royal Ulster Academy frequently throughout her life. In 1930 she showed one work at the Royal Hibernian Academy from an address of 17 Newington Street, Belfast.

Bickerstaff showed an interior of St James' Church on the Antrim Road at the Ulster Academy of Art's Spring Exhibition of 1942, a subject she had previously captured in 1934. The church had been destroyed in the Belfast Blitz of the previous year. At the same exhibition Bickerstaff displayed The Baptistry, St Peters, Belfast which was shown at the Ulster Academy of Arts Annual Exhibition later that year. When St Peter's Church celebrated their fiftieth anniversary in 1950, Bickerstaff's watercolour was displayed in the church hall, alongside depictions of the church by other leading Ulster artists including Colin Middleton and William St John Glenn.

Bickerstaff became a member of the Young Ulster Society in 1938, where she served as honorary secretary from 1942 until 1945. The Young Ulster Society were a literary group co-founded by Thomas Carnduff in 1936.

An Óige and the Youth Hostel Association of Northern Ireland hosted a joint exhibition in Mountjoy Square, Dublin in 1945, which included a Bickerstaff landscape called Fading Light. The Council for the Encouragement of Music and the Arts hosted a joint exhibition of works by Bickerstaff, and the founder of the Ulster Watercolour Society, Wilfred Haughton, in the spring of 1949.

Bickerstaff donated work to a charity exhibition in the Ulster Hall organised by Gladys Maccabe in aid of an ex-servicemans charity in 1951. The exhibition showed more than twenty donated works from Olive Henry, Violet McAdoo, John Luke and William Conor, amongst many others.

Bickerstaff showed regularly with Bangor Art Club. In 1955 whilst lamenting the inconsistent quality of the show, one critic writes,

"Renee Bickerstaff, who is of course a well-known artist, in her Old Cloisters, Oxford gives a useful object lesson in handling to her less sure fellow club members,"

Bickerstaff was appointed honorary treasurer of the Ulster Society Women Artists when they were formed by Gladys Maccabe, Deborah Brown, Alice Berger Hammerschlag and others in late 1957. She remained treasurer for twenty-one years and was to show with the Society for the rest of her life.

Bickerstaff showed at the inaugural exhibition of the Royal Ulster Academy Association, hosted at the Anderson and McAuley Exhibition Hall in 1963. The Anderley Gallery on Belfasts Donegall Place was the venue for a joint exhibition with Lee Stewart in the summer of 1971. In 1974 Bickerstaff was elected Associate of the Royal Ulster Academy of Arts alongside Carolyn Mulholland and Francis Neill. In the same year Biggerstaff had a joint exhibition with Lee Stewart at the Centre Gallery, Stranmillis. In the year of her death Bickerstaff was elected Honorary Academician of the Royal Ulster Academy of Arts.

She was a member of the Ulster Watercolour Society and also a member of the Royal Hibernian Academy. Bickerstaff was an art teacher for some years at Holyrood School in Belfast.

== Death and legacy ==
Bickerstaff died on 22 December 1983. A substantial number of works were discovered in her home after her death with which The Malone Gallery, a commercial gallery in Belfast, hosted a retrospective in 1984. Both the Ulster Society of Women Artists and the Royal Ulster Academy displayed her work in their respective annual shows of 1984.

Her work is held in many private and public collections including the Armagh County Museum, and the Royal Ulster Academy of Arts.
