= Markey Robinson =

Irish artist (1918–1999)

- Born: James Markus Robinson Marcus Robinson; 19 September 1910; Belfast, County Antrim
- Died: 24 January 1999 (aged 89); Belfast, County Antrim
- Resting place: Ballylesson Graveyard, County Down
- Education: home schooled
- Alma mater: Belfast School of Art
- Style: Figurative abstraction

David Marcus Robinson (7 February 1918 – 28 January 1999) was an Irish painter and sculptor with a primitive representational style.

== Early life ==
Robinson was born on 7 February 1918 in Belfast, Northern Ireland, the son of a house painter. Robinson began drawing at an early age and preferred it to playing outdoors with other children. His talents were first recognised whilst at Perth Street School were his teacher suggested he received artistic training. Unfortunately due to financial constraints this was not possible so Robinson held a succession of menial jobs such as dish-washer and pearl-diver until, the age of twenty when he began an apprenticeship in welding. As a child Robinson "read voraciously on art".

For a time Robinson was a successful amateur featherweight boxer, fighting under the name Boyo Marko. At the outbreak of World War II he joined the Casualty Service of the Civil Defence. Robinson trained for a short time at Belfast School of Art in the late 1930s and early 1940s, working for a time with Sidney Smith who held a studio on Howard Street. He was seen to be a mysterious character who frequently disappeared for long periods of time, only to re-appear with numerous completed paintings. It is assumed that in these periods of absence that he was working at sea. Robinson held a studio on the Crumlin Road for a number of years. In 1944 he married a local stitcher called May Clarke, living initially just a few doors away from his parents. The couple were to have two daughters, Bernice and Annie.

== Artistic career ==
Throughout the 1940s Robinson showed with the Ulster Academy of Arts and at Heals Mansard Gallery in London. Robinson entered two works to the Civil Defence Art Exhibition in 1943. Bomb Crater in Eglington Street and Fire at the International were accepted from the 1,300 works submitted to the juried exhibition and went on display at Belfast Museum and Art Gallery. They were later amongst twelve works including Romeo Toogood's Gleno and James McCord's McAdam's Farm, forwarded to London for inclusion in the Civil Defence Exhibition on Bond Street that summer. The Council for the Encouragement of Music and the Arts sponsored a group exhibition in the textile business of William Ewart & Sons on Bedford Street in Belfast in 1944 when Robinson showed alongside Colin Middleton, George Campbell, Gerard Dillon and Sidney Smith.

Robinson travelled extensively in his time as a merchant seaman, visiting South America, Europe, Asia and Africa. His work shows the influence of native African and South American art. He spent time with Native Americans in Canada and travelled on the River Plate and on the Amazon. Robinson took his family across Europe and spent some time in Paris where he befriended Raoul Dufy and he lived in Spain on the same street as Joan Miró. Robinson was a great believer that you couldn't be called an artist until you had visited Paris. During the turmoil of the 1940s he would often take his daughter Annie to Paris were they stayed in refugee camps. The gallery owner and dealer Hugh Charlton who was amongst the earliest to recognise Robinson's worth commented on his internationalism a few days before the artist's death:

"He is very concerned about Chernobyl, Northern Ireland and any human rights issues. The Troubles in the North are a source of much hardship for him. He simply cannot understand terrorism. The violence drove him out of Belfast and into Dublin in the seventies, but he is back up in the Shankill Road again."

Robinson showed one painting, simply entitled Painting in the inaugural Irish Exhibition of Living Art in the 1940s. In his early career Robinson would sell his paintings from the railings of St. Stephen's Green in Dublin and the Country Shop on St. Stephen's Green became his gallery. The Council for the Encouragement of Music and the Arts hosted a one-man exhibition of Robinson's work in 1947. The exhibition was visited by the cast of Sadlers Wells Opera Company, when the mezza-soprano singer Anna Pollak, who, like Robinson had no formal training, purchased one of his works. Robinson returned to the CEMA Gallery in the following year where he showed street scenes, portraits, and landscapes. The exhibition was opened by the actor and Head of CEMA in Northern Ireland, Jack Loudan. Robinson also arranged an exhibition of Ulster peasant art at Mills and Gray's Gallery on Wellington Street in Belfast in November 1948. The exhibition showcased craftwork from across Northern Ireland and consisted of pottery, basketwork, toys and painted linen.

By the end of the 1940s Robinson had become an established artist, lauded by the young regionalist poet and founding member of CEMA, John Hewitt, and he was an active figure on the Belfast Arts scene. Amongst his social group numbered local artists such as Alicia Boyle, Rowel Friers, John Luke, and Colin Middleton and writers such as Roy McFadden and W R Rodgers. One of his closest friends was his mentor, the Ukrainian artist Paul Nietsche who is credited with not only improving Robinson's technique but more importantly for introducing him to the influential art collector Zoltan Lewinter-Frankl. Frankl too became a close friend and patron, as did the writer F L Green. In Green's 1945 novel Odd Man Out the character of Lukey Mulquin, a young and eccentric portrait painter was inspired by the ebullience of Markey Robinson.

Robinson held an exhibition in the unconventional surrounds of Cottar's Kitchen, a cafe on Belfast's Donegall Square in 1950. In the following year Robinson held a small show in the foyer of the Arts Theatre. Throughout the 1950s Robinson turned his hand to toymaking, supplying leprechauns, fairies and goblins for sale by his friend Mrs Ann Stonley, a Scottish native living in Belfast. He showed at the McNiece Gallery, Belfast in 1955 and at Robinson and Cleaver's Gallery in 1956. He exhibited extensively throughout the sixties with solo exhibitions at the Piccolo Gallery in 1961, Furnishings Expert Limited, Belfast and at the Magee Gallery on Donegall Square, both in 1963. Upon his return from a period working in Spain in 1969, he found his studio had been razed in a fire, so he promptly returned to Spain. When Robinson returned to Belfast in the following year he found the civil disturbances too much to process so he relocated to Dublin.

Throughout the seventies he continued working and showing widely across Ireland at galleries such as the Oriel where he commanded five shows between 1973 and 1980, and at the Bell Gallery, Belfast in 1971 and the Sligo Art Gallery in 1977. Robinson also took his paintings across to the UK with exhibitions in the Attic Gallery, Cardiff and at the Redfern Gallery, London, and his work was also displayed in the Parisian Eleves Gallery.

Many dealers and critics did not take Robinson's talents and work seriously, and yet more dismissed his works as amateurish, unfinished and repetitive. The reality was that only a small cross-section of his works were ever shown, primarily landscapes, because there was no market for the others. For this reason Robinson often repainted the same scenes whilst lamenting the dealers who he felt prohibited him from painting the subjects in which he was most interested.

Susan Stairs critiqued his work as follows:

"The beauty of Markey's work is its spontaneity of line, its freshness of approach. His works do not have a contrived 'finished' appearance. Some galleries felt that this rawness was detrimental to the sale of his work and actually employed people to touch up certain areas in Markey's paintings which they felt was 'unfinished'."

Robinson showed in Philadelphia with a one-man exhibition at Villanova University in 1990. Robinson returned to his Belfast roots in 1996, making his home at Tudor Place off the Crumlin Road where he was to die just three years later.

== Death and legacy ==
Markey Robinson died at his home in Belfast on 28 January 1999, aged 80. He was survived by two daughters, an ex-wife, and three grandchildren. His ex-wife died in November of the same year. Robinson died intestate leaving at least eleven bank accounts where he had deposited large sums of cash, totalling in excess of £200,000.

Robinson's works were often subject to squabbles amongst gallery owners over who had the right to show his works. Robinson was a shy and gentle character, who had little if any interest in the business of art, the dealer system or indeed in the financial benefits of his work. He spurned publicity and rarely attended opening nights or allowed his photo to be taken. He painted for himself and for those who appreciated his work. Legal arguments over Robinson's work and his estate were to continue long after his death.

Robinson's work can be found in many private collections across the world and in public collections such as the Northern Ireland Civil Service, Ulster Museum and Queen's University, Belfast.
