= Olive Henry =

Northern Irish artist (1902–1989)

Olive Henry HRUA
- Born: 15 January 1902; Belfast, Ireland
- Died: 8 November 1989 (aged 87); Crawfordsburn, County Down
- Education: Belfast School of Art
- Known for: co-founder of the Ulster Society of Women Artists

Olive Henry HRUA (15 January 1902 -8 November 1989) was a Northern Irish artist known for her painting, photography and stained glass design. She was a founding member of the Ulster Society of Women Artists and is believed to have been the only female stained glass artist working in Northern Ireland in the first half of the twentieth century.

== Early life ==
Olive Henry was born in Belfast on 15 January 1902, the daughter of the tea merchant George Adams Henry. She attended Mount Pottinger National School, and Victoria College, before expanding her studies at night classes at the Belfast School of Art.

Henry completed an apprenticeship at Clokey Stained Glass Studios founded by Walter Francis Clokey where she was to work for over fifty years designing stained glass windows. Her appointment in Autumn of 1919 came by a chance visit to Victoria College by the firm's owner who was seeking a suitable apprentice. Henry retired from the firm at Easter 1972. Snoddy suggests that Henry may have been the only female stained-glass artist to ever have worked in Northern Ireland.

== Artistic career ==
In addition to her stained glass work Henry exhibited her paintings widely in the Oireachtas, Belfast Art Society, Royal Ulster Academy, Royal Hibernian Academy, the Irish Exhibition of Living Art, Watercolour Society of Ireland, Belfast Museum and Art Gallery (now the Ulster Museum) and the National Society in London. She was a founding member, with Gladys Maccabe, of the Ulster Society of Women Artists and was president of the society from 1979 to 1981.

1928 saw Henry exhibit at the Belfast Art Society for the first time. She exhibited four works, all landscapes in oil, and then a further two works in the following year. In 1931 Henry showed a further two works with the successor to the Belfast Art Society, the Ulster Academy of Arts. In 1932 Henry showed A Derbyshire Village described by one critic as "a delightful English rural scene." Between 1931 and 1942 Henry showed with more than twenty paintings at the Ulster Academy of Arts, exhibiting at each annual show in that time.

Henry had a keen interest in photography from an early age and won various awards for her photographs. In 1934 she won the August prize from the Photographic Dealers' Association for a shot of a child playing with toys in the bath, having received a consolation prize of five shillings in September of the previous year for a shot of a traditional market scene in Boulogne. Henry went on to write a regular column for Amateur Photographer throughout the 1930s.

In January 1935 Henry was appointed leader of a local sketching group by the Youth Hostel Association. In December 1935 Henry was commended for a sketch called River Pool, submitted to a competition judged by James Humbert Craig on behalf of the Youth Hostel Association, presented alongside Port Muck in a show with the sketching group. Maurice Wilks contributed Skernaghan Point, Brown's Bay to the same show.

The Robinson and Cleaver Art Gallery staged a display of works from Four Ulster Artists in 1936 consisting of paintings from Henry, her sister Marjorie, Theo Gracey, and F H Hummel. Henry contributed Green Boat, which she had presented earlier in the year to the Ulster Academy of Arts, and included Off the Scilly Isles amongst pictures from Brittany and Bavaria. The reviewer in the Belfast Newsletter refers to Henry's style as "Post-Impressionism."

In 1937 Henry was elected an Associate of the Ulster Academy of Arts. In 1938 Henry presented three watercolours to the Ulster Academy of Arts. Commenting on Henry's watercolours the Northern Whig's journalist writes:

"Miss Henry in especial has a rare command of her medium and an ability to make it expressive in a way that is different from the water-colour exhibitionists at the Academy. She has two very Breton studies -one Breton Departure Piece (No.165) is conceived plainly as decoration, while the other Sea Mill (No.190) has an emotional as well as decorative appeal and both are characterised by firmness of drawing and a lovely sense of colour."

The exhibition was opened by Oliver St. John Gogarty with participants such as John Luke, Maurice Wilks, James Humbert Craig, Rosamund Praeger and Colin Middleton who showed three Surrealist works including Angelus.

The Royal Hibernian Academy displayed two small works Flight, 1941 and Lakeside amongst an unusually large contingent of Ulster artists in the annual exhibition in the spring of 1942. The Ulster Academy of Arts were united in their commitment to raise funds for the bomb damaged Ulster Hospital for Children and Women in their Spring Exhibition of 1942. Henry displayed a sense of humour in her use of black-out paint, roadblocks and air raid shelters in one of the watercolours on show.

Henry was a regular exhibitor with the Water Colour Society of Ireland, and contributed more than one hundred works to their exhibitions between 1943 and 1986.

Henry joined Violet McAdoo in a joint exhibition at the Belfast Museum and Art Gallery in 1944. McAdoo presented with watercolours however Henry also presented oils. The pictures were primarily of landscapes but included a number urban scenes.

In 1945 Henry and her sister Margaret joined the Campbell brothers Arthur and George, Colin Middleton, Gladys and Max Maccabe, Tom Carr, Maurice Wilks, James McIntyre and others, in the only official exhibition from the Ulster branch of the Artists' International Association sponsored by the Council for the Encouragement of Music and the Arts (NI) at the Belfast Museum.

The MacGaffin Gallery at Pottinger's Entry was the venue for a group exhibition of experimental and modernist works with Nevill Johnson, Aaron McAfee and the MacCabes in 1946, where Henry exhibited seven paintings. Quayside was one of three pictures that Henry presented at the Ulster Academy in 1946. She also showed it with the Watercolour Society of Ireland in the following year and at CEMA's Some Ulster Paintings exhibition in that same year.

In 1946 the Council for the Encouragement of Music and Art purchased a painting by Henry, in addition to works by other contemporary Ulster artists. Twenty-four of the works from the CEMA collection, including Henry's painting, were later presented at their Donegall Place gallery in 1954.

Henry debuted at the 1948 Irish Exhibition of Living Art with one painting and returned in each of the subsequent ten years with a total of 20 pictures. Henry was also elected as an Honorary Academician of the Ulster Academy of Arts in 1948.

Henry displayed one work Harbour, Northern Ireland with Violet McAdoo at the 88th exhibition of the Society of Women Artists at the Royal Institute Galleries in London during the summer of 1949. Just a few months later Henry's work was back in London for the United Society of Artists annual exhibition where she showed Gossip and Shell and Sail.

Henry was awarded a travel scholarship from the Soroptomists of Belgium in 1957, which enabled her to study stained glass in the country. Henry was the President of Soroptomist Club of Belfast from 1960 to 1961, where she had been a member since its foundation in 1932.

Upon her return from Belgium CEMA staged a solo exhibition with thirty-five of Henry's oils and watercolours at their Belfast gallery. The exhibition was arranged at short notice when another was unexpectedly cancelled. Writer Nesca Robb opened the exhibition where it is claimed a new painting technique was revealed -"monopainting", described as paint drawn through a gauze over glass. The exhibition included a 'Breton' series, Kerry Tangle, Ship Pattern, Barrack Shapes, Lough Shapes, and Backs. In addition she displayed In the Park, an oil previously seen at the Royal Ulster Academy in 1955 and at the Irish Exhibition of Living Art in 1956, and a second oil City Lunch Hour exhibited at the Royal Ulster Academy in 1956. One critic commented that the show was

"...one of the most vital and interesting exhibitions that CEMA has sponsored -a belated but welcome tribute to an artist, who has received all too little public recognition. Miss Henry is at once one of the most forceful and most discreet of our painters -forceful in the clarity of her design and the boldness of her colour; discreet in her detail and the elimination of non-essentials.

The Ulster Society of Women Artists was founded in 1957 by Gladys Maccabe with the support of Olive Henry and a number of others at a time when no arts societies were accepting female artists into their ranks. The main objective was to ensure the development of quality art and women artists in Ulster. The organisation began with ten invited artists. Henry was to exhibit with the society throughout her life.

Henry received a mention in the local press referring to her exhibits in the Royal Ulster Academy show of 1959 with Kenneth Jamison comparing her work with that of Deborah Brown, "Olive Henry is more decadent by instinct, a fine formaliser. Her pictures Man and Ropes and Riviera Port, well defined and carefully abstracted, contrast in form with Deborah Brown's freer Oil Over Tempra,[sic] 1959."

A group exhibition In 1964 at the New Gallery in Belfast included work from Henry alongside Neil Shawcross, Max Maccabe, Kathleen Bell, Richard Croft and Helen Ross. Amongst other works Henry showed Easter and Long Garden.

In 1965 Henry joined twelve Ulster artists including Alice Berger-Hammerschlag, Basil Blackshaw, Colin Middleton, Romeo Toogood, and Mercy Hunter in a diverse exhibition of landscape paintings at the Arts Council Of Northern Ireland Gallery. In the same year Henry completed a commission from the Sullivan Association of Former Pupils to design a window for Sullivan Upper School in Holywood, County Down.

In 1981 the Ulster Society of Womens Artists elected Henry as President. A retrospective of Henry's studio works was hosted by the Shambles Gallery in Hillsborough, County Down in 1986, some thirty years since her last solo exhibition. Henry showed at the Royal Ulster Academy Annual Exhibition in 1987 for the last time.

== Death and legacy ==
Olive Henry died on 8 November 1989 at Crawfordsburn, County Down.

Her paintings are held in the collections of the Northern Ireland Civil Service, Ulster Museum, Irish Linen Centre & Lisburn Museum, and the Royal Ulster Academy of Arts Diploma Collection.
