= Alicia Boyle =

Irish artist

Alicia Boyle RBA, RHA, RUA
- Born: Alicia Louisa Letitia Boyle; 1 August 1908; Bangkok, Siam
- Died: January 11, 1997 (aged 88); Dublin, Ireland
- Education: Clapham Art Training School
- Alma mater: Byam Shaw School of Drawing & Painting
- Known for: Abstract marine and landscape painting

Alicia Louisa Letitia Boyle RBA, RHA, RUA (1 August 1908 – 11 January 1997) was an Irish abstract marine and landscape artist.

== Early life and education ==
Alicia Boyle was born on 1 August 1908 to Brudenell P. Boyle, an engineer, and his wife Birney in Bangkok, Siam. Boyle had two brothers. She was raised in Limavady in Northern Ireland and moved to London, England with her family at the age of ten. At the age of two Boyle contracted cholera.

Boyle began to paint at the age of five. Her parents encouraged her to paint around Limavady and Magilligan. Her mother also introduced her to the work of playwrights such as William Shakespeare, Seán O'Casey, and George Bernard Shaw. Together they attended the theatre and art exhibitions. When her Mother died and her Father remarried, Boyle felt unable to remain in the family home and left to live in a bedsit.

At the age of seventeen Boyle enrolled on a teacher-training course at Clapham Art Training School where she studied for four years. From 1929 until 1934 Boyle attended Byam Shaw School of Drawing and Painting, where she studied drawing, painting and mural decoration under Ernest Jackson. Boyle was a prizewinning student who won two scholarships whilst at Byam.

== Career ==
Boyle's early work was influenced by Matisse, Picasso, Goya and Hokusai. Having viewed Hokusai's work at the British Museum and also in attending the Chinese exhibition at the Royal Academy of Arts, Boyle began to draw with a quill and ink. She became interested in calligraphy and prepared her own quills, a practice that she was to continue throughout her life. In 1932 Boyle's painting Lot's Wife was displayed at the Royal Academy of Arts annual show. She won a commission to produce a mural for the Nurse's Home at Great Ormond Street Hospital for Sick Children two years later, which is no longer extant.

In 1939 Boyle travelled to Mykonos in the Aegean Islands as an invited artist at the School of Fine Art. The resulting works were shown in an exhibition in Athens which financed a two-month painting expedition to Italy before she returned to England before the outbreak of World War II. One of the most significant paintings of her early career was a critique of fascism, entitled Machines of Learning of 1938.

Boyle was appointed as part-time teacher at Northampton High School for Girls in January 1940. During this time Boyle designed stage-sets for ballets and plays by Tolstoy, Shaw and Shakespeare She later secured a post at Northampton Art College where the actor Jonathan Adams numbered amongst her many students. Boyle was later engaged as a visiting lecturer at West Sussex College and Farnham School of Art.

Boyle began exhibiting at the Leicester Galleries in London in 1944. She was to show annually in their Artists of Fame and Promise exhibition for more than a quarter of a century. Boyle held her first solo exhibition in the Peter Jones Gallery in London in 1945, which afforded her the luxury of reducing her teaching hours. As the decade drew to a close Boyle became inspired by her native land after visits to Donegal and Connemara when she began to portray Irish subjects and scenes. A second masterpiece of this era, White Horse was inspired by a chance meeting with locals near Claidhneach, Connemara in 1949. The Council For the Encouragement for Music and the Arts (CEMA) purchased the painting in 1950, and displayed in an exhibition of CEMA purchases at their 55a Donegall Place gallery in 1954. The 24 picture collection comprised work from Romeo Toogood, Colin Middleton and Sidney Smith amongst others.

Her narrative paintings of this period were inspired by the people and folktales she gathered on her travels, leading her to depict farmers and weavers, and into producing paintings that established her artistic reputation in Ulster. Her literary inspirations at this time were Marcel Proust, García Lorca, and later Frank O'Connor, Flann O'Brien and Seamus Heaney.

In 1949 she held a one-woman show in London's Leger Galleries and another at the same venue in 1951. Boyle became a member of the Midland Regional Group of Artists and Designers with whom she exhibited in the autumn of 1948 and also in 1949 Boyle debuted in Ulster with a solo exhibition at the CEMA gallery in the spring of 1950, where she displayed The red, red Cock, shown to critical acclaim at the Leger Galleries in the previous year. The Belfast Municipal Gallery purchased Potato-Washers, Connemara on the opening day of the 1950 show. Boyle showed once more with CEMA in 1952 and once again, at the Belfast Municipal Gallery in 1959.

The Scottish Committee of the Arts Council welcomed an exhibition of Contemporary Ulster Painting to Edinburgh where Boyle showed alongside George Campbell, Gerard Dillon, Paul Nietsche and Nevill Johnson. The foreword to the catalogue was written by the poet, critic and curator John Hewitt. Boyle presented an exhibition of watercolours at the Walker's Gallery, London in 1958. She was elected to the Royal Society of British Artists in 1958. Between 1958 and 1962 Boyle showed a total of twenty-six works with the Royal Society of British Artists.

Boyle showed two watercolours The Sea's Edge, Connemara and The Sorrel Field, Rossdougan at the Royal Academy of Arts in 1952, one oil, November Flowers in 1957, and a further watercolour in 1960 entitled Slatty Strand, towards Sherkin. Boyle exhibited in the Irish Exhibition of Living Art in the 1950s and in the Oireachtas Exhibition in 1976.

She was a winner of the Arts Council of Northern Ireland's first Open Painting Competition in 1962. She moved to Ireland full-time in 1971 where she built a studio in Bantry, County Cork, before later settling in Dublin. The Arts Council of Northern Ireland presented an exhibition of Boyle's watercolours in 1963. In 1973 Boyle held a joint exhibition of oils in New York with Frank Eggington. The Mother's Union of Dublin and Glendalough commissioned Boyle to illustrate You can say that again, a book about common prayer by Hilary Pyle in 1977. Boyle presented a solo exhibition at the Tom Caldwell Gallery in Belfast in the spring of 1978, having previously shown at Caldwell's Dublin gallery in 1975.

From the late 1960s and early 1970s Boyle became obsessed with the myths and songs of Sweeney, the cursed Celtic King, producing in excess of thirty paintings in a theme that enveloped her work for the remaining thirty years of her life. Between 1983 and 1989 Boyle had five solo exhibitions and three major retrospectives. Boyle was inaugurated into the National Self Portrait Collection of Ireland in 1995, alongside twelve others including Joseph O'Connor, Sidney Smith, Anna Cheyne and George Russell.

== Death and legacy ==
Alicia Boyle died in Dublin, Ireland on 11 January 1997. Boyle's estate was later valued at £407,470. Boyle bequeathed one-hundred and twenty-five sketchbooks from 1936-1996 and six oils to the National Collections of Ireland. Boyle summarised her life and work in 1988 when she told Niall MacMonagle, "It's been a journey through line and colour."

Her works are held in numerous public collections including Paintings in Hospitals, Northampton Museum and Art Gallery, Herbert Art Gallery and Museum, Abbot Hall Art Gallery, Crawford Art Gallery, Northern Ireland Civil Service, Ulster Museum, Nottingham Castle Museum, National Gallery of Ireland and the National Self Portrait Collection of Ireland.
