= Gretta Bowen =

Irish painter (1880–1981)

Margretta 'Gretta' Bowen
- Born: 1 January 1880; Dublin, Ireland
- Died: 8 April 1981 (aged 101); Belfast, County Antrim
- Resting place: City Cemetery, Belfast
- Education: Self-taught
- Known for: Genre painting
- Style: Primitive

Margretta Bowen, best known as Gretta Bowen (1 January 1880 – 8 April 1981) was a self-taught Irish artist. She only started painting late in life, after her sons Arthur and George Campbell were already established as artists.

== Early life ==
Although born in Dublin to a railway worker Samuel Arthur Bowen, Margretta Bowen lived most of her life in Belfast. She was married to Matthew Campbell, a veteran of the Boer War. They had three boys Arthur, George and Stanley, who all went on to paint. After her husband died in 1925 she ran an laundrette and took in lodgers to make ends meet.

== Career ==
Bowen came to art late in her life when a few weeks before her seventieth birthday she found paints left behind by her son Arthur, and began to experiment with them. Just five years later her first exhibition was hosted in the gallery of the Council for the Encouragement of Music and the Arts, Belfast. She went on to have numerous exhibitions in Dublin: at the David Hendricks Gallery in 1961, and with the Tom Caldwell Gallery in 1977 and 1980, having previously shown at Caldwell's Belfast Gallery in 1970, 1976 and in 1980. She had a further solo exhibition at the Bell Gallery, Belfast in 1965 and participated in many group shows including but not limited to, the Irish Exhibition of Living Art, Oireachtas, the Royal Hibernian Academy and the Ulster Society of Women Artists. In 1979, at the age of 99, her works gained international fame when she exhibited at the International Naïves exhibition in London. Bowen also showed internationally having solo and group exhibitions in the US and Canada. The Arts Council for Northern Ireland used her Rustic Sports for a widely distributed poster print in 1974. In the following year her son George was commissioned to paint her portrait which was later displayed in the Arts Council's Women of Belfast exhibition.

== Death and legacy ==
Bowen died in Belfast on 8 April 1981. Her works can be found in many collections including those of the Ulster Museum, and the Department of Environment for Northern Ireland.
