= Paul Nietsche =

Ukrainian artist and teacher (1885–1950)

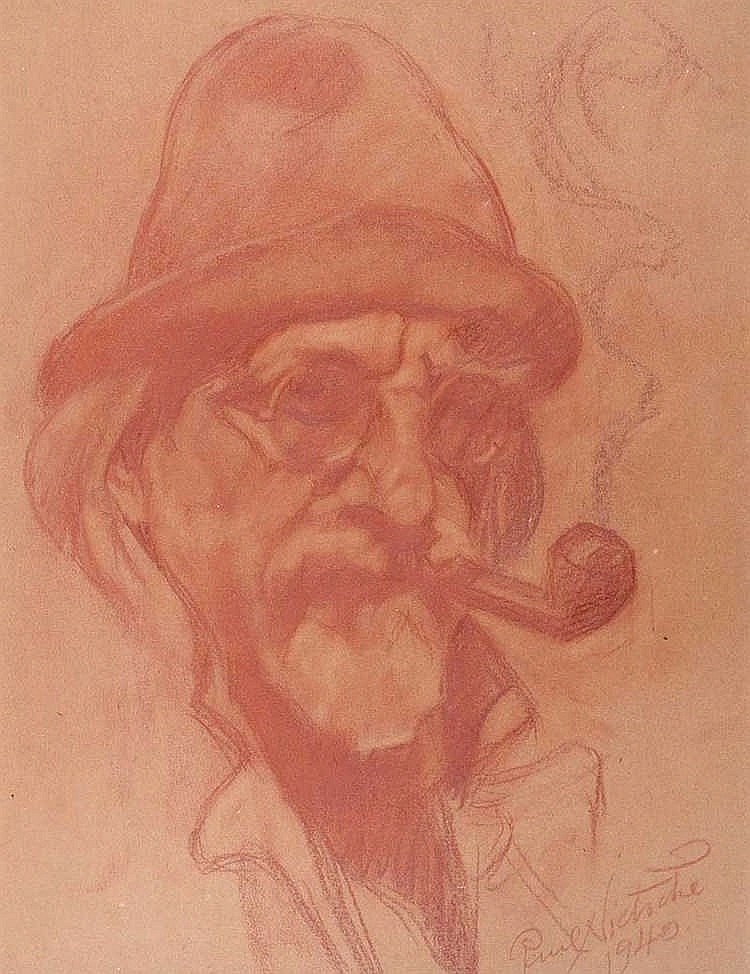
- Born: 17 June 1885; Kiev, Ukraine
- Died: 4 October 1950 (aged 65); Belfast, Northern Ireland
- Resting place: Belfast City Cemetery
- Education: Imperial Academy of Fine Art, Odessa
- Alma mater: Academy of Arts, Berlin
- Known for: Portraits & still-life

Paul Nietsche (17 June 1885 – 4 October 1950) was a Ukrainian artist and teacher who emigrated to Ulster in 1936 where he became a central figure on the Belfast artistic and literary scenes between the 1930s and his death in 1950.

== Early life ==
Paul Felix Franz Nietsche was born to German parents in Kiev in Ukraine on 17 June 1885. At the age of six his family moved to Odessa where his father established a lithographic printing firm. His artistic talents were encouraged by his Mother from a young age. Nietsche's Mother was said to have pawned his brother's coat on one occasion to buy paints for him.

Nietsche studied art at the Imperial Academy of Fine Arts in Odessa under Gennadiy Ladyzhensky and Kiriak Kostandi. In 1908 he enrolled at the Academy of Fine Arts in Berlin. Nietsche then moved to Paris where he befriended the sculptor Auguste Rodin and showed at the Salon of 1912. Nietsche returned to Odessa in 1914 where he remained until the end of World War I, when he relocated to Berlin to be with his family. In August 1919 Nietsche showed at the Der Sturm Gallery alongside Maria Uhden and Paul Busch.

== Life and works ==
Whilst living in Berlin Nietsche befriended a post-graduate student and later a lecturer in English at the University of Leipzig, the Dubliner Michael O'Brien. When O'Brien moved to Queens University Belfast as a lecturer in Celtic Studies in 1926, Nietsche was invited to visit Belfast where he was to show five paintings with the Ulster Arts Club in the same year. Between 1926 and 1934 Nietsche travelled extensively throughout Europe supported through exhibitions and picture sales. He painted outside Dubrovnik in 1928; Avignon, Castlewellan, and Switzerland in 1931; Cornwall and Berlin in 1933; and revisited both Cornwall and the South of France in the following year. Throughout this period he returned several times to Ulster, to the O'Brien's in Belfast and to fellow artist Herbert E Broderick's home in Castlewellan. In Cornwall he stayed with the painter R S Rendle Wood.

In 1929 Nietsche held an exhibition of paintings at Michael O'Brien's home at 411 Lisburn Road, Belfast. He exhibited just once at the Royal Hibernian Academy, in 1930. In the year that he settled in Northern Ireland Nietsche exhibited at the Brook Street Art Galleries in London in 1934, with a further one man show at Dublin's United Arts Club in June of that year. The London exhibition comprised 28 paintings with the majority being Cornish subjects. Two years later he held a show at the Magee Gallery in Belfast.

In 1936 Nietsche travelled extensively throughout the US and Canada, and afterwards returned to work in Devon and Cornwall before his onward journey to Belfast. At the invitation of Major R G Heyn, Nietsche's work debuted in Canada in 1936, with an exhibition at the Continental Galleries of Fine Art in Montreal. The show comprised 28 works including landscapes, still-life, flowers and a few self-portraits. Several of the landscapes were local scenes of Georgeville and Lake Memphremagog. Nietsche showed with John Hunter and George MacCann at Belfast's Magee Gallery in 1938, with a further solo display at the same venue in 1939. Nietsche applied to be a British citizen in 1938 from an address at 9 Finaghy Park Central in south Belfast.

During World War II Nietsche was interned on the Isle of Man "with chess-playing intellectuals", before re-establishing himself on the Belfast art scene by opening an attic studio at 76 Dublin Road in the city where he was to work from 1942 until the end of his life. In 1943 Nietsche showed alongside Stanley Prosser, Seamus Stoupe, and Newton Penprase in the annual Ulster Arts Club exhibition at the Belfast Municipal Gallery.

Art collector and patron Zoltan Lewinter-Frankl opened an exhibition of Nietsche's flower paintings at Tyrone House on Belfast's Ormeau Avenue in 1945. The exhibition was arranged under the auspices of the Council For the Encouragement of Music and Art with thirty works loaned from local patrons. In 1946 the Council for the Encouragement of Music and Art purchased a painting by Nietsche, in addition to works by other contemporary Ulster artists. Twenty-four of the works from the CEMA collection, including Nietsche's painting, were later presented at their Donegall Place gallery in 1954.

Nietsche showed at the CEMA Gallery in Belfast in 1947, 1948, and in 1949. The latter comprised 21 paintings and was opened by his good friend, the Lisburn writer Barbara Hunter, whom along with H E Broderick, had contributed a foreword to the 1947 exhibition. The 1949 exhibition included portraits of the stage actors Robert H McCandless, and James G Devlin and the catalogue contained a foreword by the Odd Man Out writer, FL Green. The reviewer for the Lisburn Standard commented,

"Though small in some ways, it is the finest show Nietsche has had in Belfast, for as the years go by he seems to acquire even greater genius in his art, so that he seems at times to almost improve upon nature, adding his own vitality and sensibility to his lovely studies of flowers and fruit."

The artist also wrote poetry and short stories. He was fluent in Russian, French, German and English. Nietsche parodied local attitudes to modern art in a 1948 play and in 1949 he contributed one poem, A Vision, to the shortlived Ulster poetry journal Rann established by his old friend Barbara Hunter and Roy McFadden in the previous year. His students included Jean Osborne, and Markey Robinson whom he took under his wing, teaching him technique and introducing Robinson to the influential art collector Zoltan Lewinter-Frankl.

The actor Jack Loudan described Nietsche's charitable nature in 1972, in repairing broken dolls, cars and trucks, which he would later distribute to underprivileged children around Castlewellan, County Down. Nietsche's eccentric nature was often cited, and indeed Loudan refers to the alarm experienced by visitors to Nietsche's Dublin Road studio where he fed and entertained with a mouse that had taken up residence there. Nietsche's portrait of Loudan can be viewed in the collection of the National Museums of Northern Ireland. Nietsche's eccentricities extended to his studio where the poet Roy McFadden says he "flaunted a huge ceramic penis on the wall". His home and studio were open house to visitors from members of Belfasts artistic and theatrical world, whom Nietsche would entertain with coffee and conversation whilst he continued working. He rose late in the day and worked long into the night, often retiring just before sunrise. He spent some time in Belfast City Hospital in June 1948 and later convalesced at the Crawfordsburn Inn as a guest of a friend. He never fully recovered from this illness and suffered from ill-health until his death.

== Artistic style ==
Dr S B Kennedy described Nietsche's style in 1991,

"His style was based on careful observation of the world around him. Nietsche was a fine colourist. He was at his best when painting still lifes [...] flowers and portraits [...] His landscapes by comparison are less successful, the compositions often lacking resolution while the colours are occasionally muddied and less boldly stated than in his other works. Perhaps the intimacy of a portrait or the exuberance of a group of flowers suited his temperament more than the panorama of landscape."

Dr Sarah Finlay, writing of his work in the National Self-Portrait Collection of Ireland, described his working methods,

"He worked slowly, taking up to fifteen or more sittings of one or two hours to complete each portrait. Landscapes, still lifes and flower studies make up the rest of his subject-matter. His landscapes tend to be dark, his still lifes and flower paintings more colourful. His style is loose and his line assured. The emphasis on form, in the still lifes in particular indicates the influence of Cézanne, whose work he saw and admired when living in Paris between 1912 and 1914."

== Death and legacy ==
Paul Nietsche died in Belfast City Hospital on 4 October 1950, after falling ill at his studio four days earlier whilst preparing work for exhibition in London and Dublin. He was unmarried and had no children. Nietsche was survived by three brothers.

A short funeral service was held at All Souls Church on Elmwood Avenue, before his remains were interred at Belfast City Cemetery. Amongst the mourners were Zoltan and Anny Frankl, Jack Loudan of CEMA, Professor J L Montrose of Queen's University, and Joseph Tomelty and R H McCandless of the Group Theatre. Amongst the artists present were William Conor, William R Gordon, Fred Hull, Herbert E Broderick, John Lyness and William Minshull.

His friends organised a memorial exhibition of his works in the Ulster Farmers' Union Hall in Belfast in 1952 for which Nietsche's brother Eugene made his first visit to Belfast. Jack Loudan opened the exhibition and expressed his desire to see Nietsche commanding his own section in the Belfast Museum and Art Gallery. The Arts Council of Northern Ireland held a retrospective at the Arts Council Gallery in Belfast in 1984.

His works can be seen in many public and private collections including the Ulster Museum, the Arts Council of Northern Ireland and the National Self-Portrait Collection of Ireland.
