= Gladys Maccabe =

Northern Irish artist (1918–2018)

Gladys Maccabe MBE HRUA ROI
- Portrait of Gladys Maccabe by Max Maccabe
- Born: Gladys Moore Chalmers; 5 June 1918; Randalstown, County Antrim
- Died: 22 February 2018 (aged 99); Castlewellan
- Education: Belfast School of Art
- Known for: Painting
- Spouse: Max Maccabe

Gladys Maccabe, MBE HRUA FRSA MA(Hons) ROI (5 June 1918 – 22 February 2018) was a Northern Irish artist, journalist and founder of The Ulster Society of Women Artists.

== Early life ==
Gladys Moore Maccabe was born in Randalstown, County Antrim on 5 June 1918. Her mother Elizabeth was a designer in the linen business, and her father George Chalmers, a Scot, was a former army officer and artist specialising in calligraphy and illumination. One of her ancestors was the 18th-century Scottish painter, Sir George Chalmers.

Maccabe received a general education at Brookvale Collegiate in Belfast. She had a picture published in the Royal Drawing Society's magazine when she was 16 years old and went on to study sculpture and commercial art at the Belfast School of Art. She declined an invitation to study in London after her father died. In 1941 she married fellow artist, musician and childhood friend Max Maccabe. She and Max exhibited together on many occasions, starting with a group show at Robinson & Cleaver's department store in Belfast, 1942. The couple held their first joint exhibition in 1949 at London's Kensington Art Gallery. In the same year they also had a joint exhibition at the Dawson Gallery in Dublin. In 1958 the couple had a show at the Belfast Museum and Art Gallery and another at the Richie Hendriks Gallery in Dublin in 1961.

In 1945 Maccabe and her husband Max joined the Campbell brothers Arthur and George, the Henry sisters, Olive and Margaret, Colin Middleton, Tom Carr, Maurice Wilks, James McIntyre and others, in the only official exhibition from the Ulster branch of the Artists' International Association sponsored by the Council for the Encouragement of Music and the Arts (NI) at the Belfast Museum.

The MacGaffin Gallery at Pottinger's Entry in Belfast was the venue for a group exhibition of experimental and modernist works with her husband, Nevill Johnson, Aaron McAfee and Olive Henry in 1946. Maccabe was one of seventy-three exhibitors when the Cultural Relations Committee took a touring exhibition of Contemporary Irish Painting to Rhode Island, Boston and to Ottawa. She was represented at the Royal Ulster Academy 's annual show in 1950 by a portrait of Her Majesty the Queen at Balmoral, July 1950. Maccabe showed in the 1956 Artists of Fame and Promise exhibition at the Leicester Galleries in London.

Gladys and Max were members of the group of artists known as The Contemporary Ulster Group, which included Dan O'Neill, George Campbell, and Gerard Dillon, all of whom she had met during WW2. William Conor was also an associate and Maccabe painted his portrait in 1957. With the assistance of Olive Henry, Maccabe formed the Ulster Society of Women Artists in 1957 with ten invited artists, as she felt that there was an untapped wealth of talent among the women artists of Northern Ireland. Maccabe served as the Society's first President. The Society's first major exhibition was in the Belfast Museum and Art Gallery in 1959. Maccabe’s son, Christopher Maccabe CB, a prominent ex-civil servant, attended the society's sixtieth anniversary exhibition in 2017 as her representative. Maccabe showed a stained glass work with a poem by Anne Ruthven entitled the Crooked Cross at the USWA annual exhibition at the Bell Gallery in 1965.

During the 1960s Maccabe was a fashion and arts correspondent working for newspapers and television. She was Northern Ireland Art Critic for the Irish Independent and the Irish News and wrote columns for the Sunday Independent, Leisure Painter and the Ulster Tatler. She was also fashion correspondent for the Belfast News Letter and BBC Northern Ireland.

Maccabe had a one woman show at the Emer Gallery, a commercial gallery in Belfast city centre, in the autumn of 1993.

== Work ==
Much of Maccabe's work is concerned with the depiction of gatherings of people, whether at race meetings, a fair or market, on the beach or in a shop. She has also painted flowers, still lifes, and a variety of abstract works. Both Maccabe and her husband were skilled musicians who travelled across Ulster delivering lectures, combining live painting with live music. Maccabe played piano whilst Max played violin.

During the height of The Troubles in Northern Ireland in 1969, Maccabe was moved to depict the scenes she saw around her at that time. In October 1969 four of her paintings were included in the annual exhibition of the Royal Institute of Oil Painters in London with whom she had shown since 1957. These paintings were entitled Barricades, Blazing Warehouse, Petrol Bomb Sequel and Funeral of a Victim. Several of her works were included in the centenary exhibition of the Royal Institute of Oil Painters in 1982. At the time she was the Institute's only Irish member. Maccabe was inducted into the National Self-Portrait of Ireland Collection in the spring of 1986.

In 1989, a retrospective exhibition of her work was held at The George Gallery, Dublin. Entitled Gladys Maccabe, A Lifetime of Art, The Retrospective, the exhibition featured paintings dating from 1935 to 1989. She has also exhibited at the Paris Salon, the Royal Scottish Academy, the Royal Hibernian Academy, Oireachtas, and the Irish Exhibition of Living Art. She was a member of the Water Colour Society of Ireland.

== Awards ==
In 1961 Maccabe was elected a Member of the Royal Institute of Oil Painters. The Academia Italia delle Arte e del Lavoro awarded Maccabe a gold medal in 1979. The following year she was awarded an Honorary MA degree by the Queen's University Belfast. She was also an Honorary Academician of the Royal Ulster Academy, a Fellow of the Royal Society of Arts, and has received many other accolades including the 1984 World Culture Prize. Maccabe was appointed a Member of the Order of the British Empire (MBE) for services to the arts by Her Majesty Queen Elizabeth II on 21 November 2000. A Blue Plaque commemorating Maccabe was unveiled at her studio at 17, Stranmillis Road, Belfast in May 2023.

== Death and legacy ==
Maccabe spent her final years in River House in Newcastle and Wood Lodge in Castlewellan. She died on 22 February 2018, just a few months short of her one-hundredth birthday.

Examples of her work are in The Ulster Museum, The Royal Ulster Academy, The Arts Council of Ireland Collection, Arts Council of Northern Ireland, The Imperial War Museum, The National Self-Portrait Collection of Ireland, National Gallery of Ireland, and many other permanent collections.
