= Armagh County Museum =

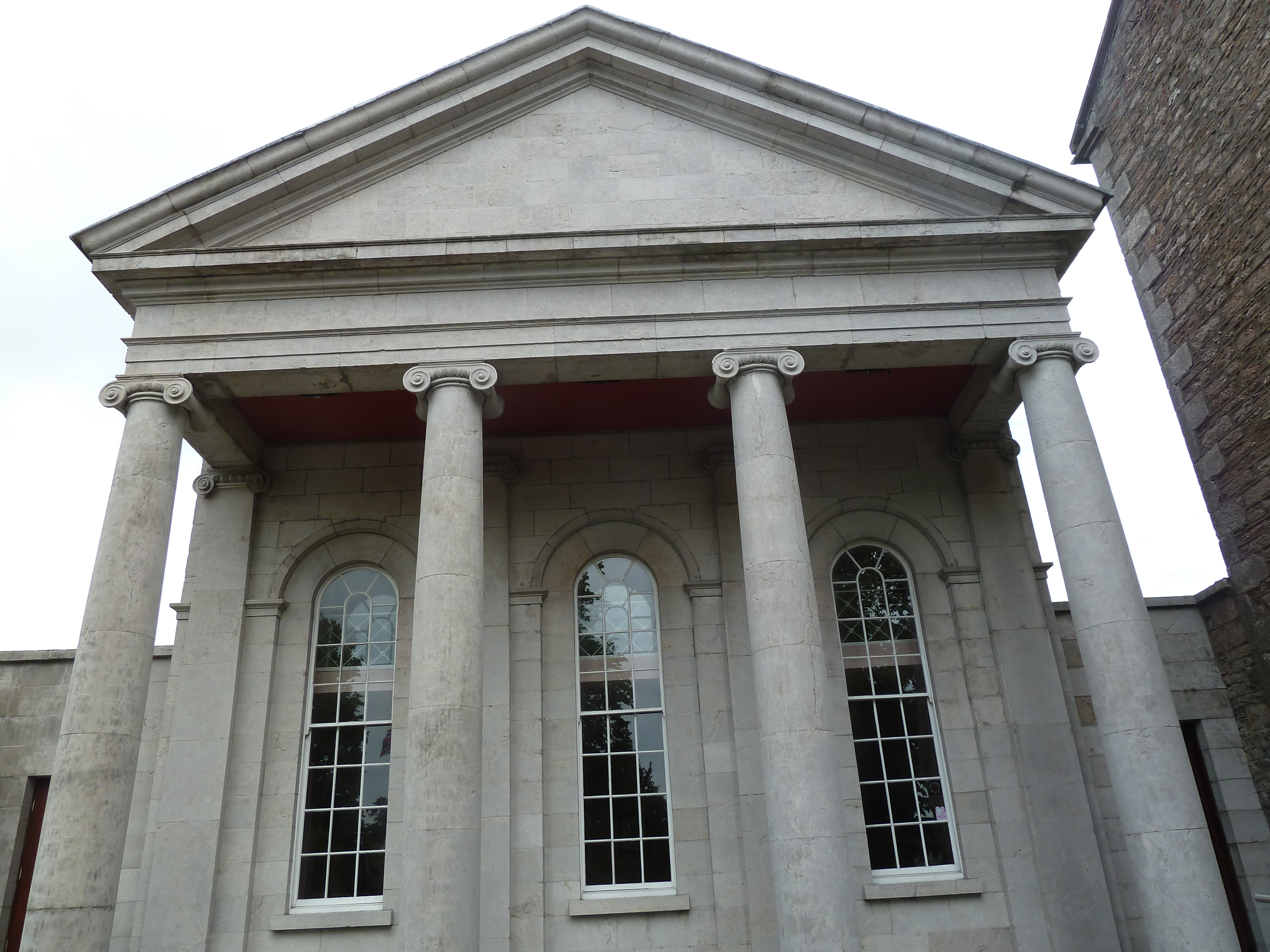
- Neoclassical façade of Armagh Museum
- Established: 1937
- Location: Armagh
- Type: Historical museum
- Collections: Archaeology, Art, Costume, Taxidermy, Library
- Collection size: 360,000
- Founder: Armagh County Council
- Owner: Armagh City, Banbridge and Craigavon Borough Council
- Parking: Street
- Website: armaghcountymuseum.co.uk

The Armagh County Museum is a museum in Armagh, County Armagh, Northern Ireland. Located on the edge of the tree-lined Mall in the centre of Armagh city, the museum is the oldest County Museum in Ireland and was officially opened in 1937.

== History ==
=== Charlemont Place National School (1835–1840s) ===
The building was originally established as Charlemont Place National School and the architect may have been Francis Johnston's pupil, William Murray.

=== Armagh Natural History and Philosophical Society (1856–1930) ===
The school was not a success and the trustees transferred the lease to Armagh Natural History and Philosophical Society in 1856. They utilised the premises as their reading room, library, lecture hall and museum. It was their museum that formed the foundation of what would become Armagh County Museum's collection. They employed architect Edward Gardner to convert the one room interior into two ground floor rooms and a broad balcony housing the museum above. The Society and museum expanded during the latter half of the nineteenth century and by 1888 it had 275 members paying an annual subscription of five shillings each. In that year the interior layout of the building was described thus: "To economise space, the reading room, by the withdrawal of a partition formed of shutters, becomes the stage of the theatre, and the theatre and museum are one. A good collection of specimens has been secured for the illustration of lectures on natural history. The library is well stocked with books in the following departments: – Antiquities, Astronomy, Arts, Biography, Chemistry, Economics, Geography, Geology, and Mineralogy, History, Mechanics, Metaphysics, Microscopy, Natural History, Natural Philosophy, Poetry, and general literature..." In 1891 Art Rooms were built immediately behind the museum and for some years an Art School flourished under the auspices of the Science & Art department of the South Kensington Museum.

=== Birth of County Museum (1930–1937) ===
In 1930, Armagh County Council took over the building with the primary purpose of using it as a repository for the County Library. However, the council secretary, T.E. Reid, persuaded the council to rejuvenate the Philosophical Society's museum. In 1933, the council commissioned J.A. Sidney Stendall then Assistant Curator at Belfast Municipal Museum & Art Gallery to write a report on the current state of the museum and how it should be developed. He found many of the "curiosities" collected by the Philosophical Society to be of little value to a modern County Museum and advised "that the few scattered ethnographic objects should be likewise jettisoned, including the very dilapidated mummy...". By 1934, they had expended £1,300 "on the reconstruction of the buildings to make them suitable for a central Book Repository and Museum". The same council minutes recommend that £50 per annun be spent "for the assistance of the Honorary Curator". The honorary curator was 46-year-old local historian George Paterson or as he became known through his writing, T.G.F. Paterson. By November 1934, he had been appointed "whole-time curator for three years commencing on the 1st January, 1935, at a salary of £3.0.0 per. week". Several years were spent rationalizing the collection and refitting the display cases as well as making alterations to the building. This was completed by 1937 and on 28 April of that year, James Caulfeild, 8th Viscount Charlemont in his role as Minister of Education for Northern Ireland performed the opening ceremony. The Carnegie U.K. Trust had contributed funds to complete the refurbishment of the museum and in 1938 they contributed a further £162.10s.0d towards further development of the new museum.

=== T.G.F. Paterson (1888–1972) ===
Thomas George Farquhar Paterson was born in Canada on 29 February 1888. His father had emigrated there shortly after his marriage. While he was still a young child, Paterson returned to Ireland with his family. They settled on the family farm in the townland of Cornascreeb near Portadown in County Armagh. In his early days, he often signed his name George Paterson and his friends knew him simply as Tommy. However, his numerous articles and essays published in newspapers and journals over the years were almost always signed T.G.F. Paterson.

Although he was from a farming background, young Thomas was apprenticed to a Portadown grocery business, Davidsons. He was later to continue in this line of work in Armagh, working for the old established grocers, Couser's which catered for the local landed gentry. He possessed no formal academic training but had a curiosity about his surroundings which served him in his role as museum curator. He quickly began adding to the collection, and had wide-ranging interests which meant he acquired artefacts which varied from archaeological artefacts to eighteenth century costume. He also commissioned a work by Belfast-based artist John Luke, who had moved to County Armagh to escape the blitz during the Second World War. Paterson commissioned him to paint a local scene for the museum's developing art collection. The Old Callan Bridge (1945) has become one of the museum's "treasures" and is recognised as one of Luke's finest works.

=== Developing the collections ===
Paterson was also interested in local artists, including in Lurgan-born polymath "Æ"(George Russell). Over the years he managed to persuade a number of Russell's contemporaries, including Lily Yeats, to donate paintings and personal articles associated with the artist. As a result, the museum has 26 of AE's paintings, hundreds of letters written by him and such personal items as his spectacles, passport, his painting palette and birthday book. Paterson's ambition to collect ranged across all the subjects relevant to a regional museum. Uniforms and accoutrements from the period of the Volunteers in the 1780s were acquired, as were harvest knots and rush-light candleholders used by the rural communities of South Armagh. By the late 1950s, the museum had expanded to capacity and Armagh County Council was persuaded to spend money on an expansion programme.

=== Refurbishment (1959–1962) ===
In January 1955 D.R.M. (Roger) Weatherup had been appointed as Paterson's Deputy Curator. Paterson and Weatherup spent several months of 1959 packing up the collections and emptying the display cases in readiness for the major refurbishment. Their temporary home for the next few years would be the nearby Armagh jail. Paterson was allocated a cell as his office where he continued his research and writing.

=== 1960s ===
During the closure of the museum all of the old buildings behind the neoclassical facade were demolished including the 1890s Art School. A new red-brick extension was built that would accommodate the museum on the first floor and the library repository below. The improvements incorporated a caretaker's residence at the rear of the premises but as work neared completion the council was persuaded that the need for a live-in caretaker was unnecessary. It was thought the residence would suit Mr Paterson better and after the official opening in September 1962 he moved into his new home. He was to retire the following year but spent the rest of his days living in the museum he had been instrumental in creating.

In March 1963 Roger Weatherup took on the role of curator.

=== 1970s and 1980s ===
In the early 1970s re-organisation of Northern Ireland's local government and the abolition of Armagh County Council meant the museum was left without the governing body that had been its funder since 1930. The newly formed Armagh District Council was unable to afford the museum so in 1973 an agreement was reached that the museum would be transferred to the Ulster Museum. This began a 40-year relationship with Northern Ireland's National Museum in Belfast. The close relationship with the Ulster Museum brought many advantages, not least the ability to rely on the skills and resources of the larger institution. A chance to expand the museum was realised in the early 1980s when the construction of a dedicated Library Headquarters on the outskirts of Armagh city at Woodford meant the ground floor became vacant. The museum took over the library premises rooms utilising them as storage and offices.

=== 1990s to present ===
Following the Wilson report in 1995 it was decided to merge the Ulster Museum with the Ulster Folk & Transport Museum and the Ulster American Folk Park. The Museums and Galleries (Northern Ireland) Order 1997 realised this goal. Armagh County Museum was included in this plan and became part of National Museums Northern Ireland (NMNI). It has continued as one of the four components of National Museums Northern Ireland since then and like the other sites is funded by the Department of Culture Arts and Leisure (DCAL). In April 2015, as part of Northern Ireland's Review of Public Administration the museum was transferred to the newly formed Armagh City, Banbridge and Craigavon Borough Council.

== Collections ==
=== Archaeology ===
Many of the megalithic sites in South Armagh were subject to excavations undertaken during the 1930s and 1940s. As a consequence the museum acquired excavation material from sites such as Clontygora and Annaghmare. This material is supplemented by objects from the private collections of the Philosophical Society.

=== Transport ===
The transport section contains materials and ephemera such as handbills, posters and railway memorabilia collected by D.R.M. Weatherup during the 1960s when the local rail infrastructure was in decline.

=== Costume ===
Paterson's contacts with many of the Armagh landed gentry went back to his early days when he managed Couser's grocers in Armagh during the 1920s. Decades later when many of the "big houses" were closing up, many of the people he had done business back then donated the contents of their ancestors' wardrobes.

=== Art ===
The art collection can be divided into the following broad categories: paintings by local artists; paintings of local people; and works representing county Armagh's buildings and topography. There are also paintings from Northern Irish artists such as T.P. Flanagan, Maurice MacGonigal, Beatrice Glenavy, James Humbert Craig, Maurice Wilks, John Luke, Cecil Maguire, James Sinton Sleator, William Conor, and Charles Lamb. Most of the older family portraits are by unknown artists with some exceptions, including Stephen Slaughter's portrait of Primate Hoadly and Martin Cregan's portraits of Leonard Dobbin and Sir William Verner.

The English watercolour artist Cornelius Varley toured Ireland in 1808 and his pencil drawings of Armagh city and Markethill are also in the collection.
