= W. R. Rodgers =

Northern Irish poet (1909–1969)

William Robert Rodgers (1909–1969), known as Bertie, and born in Belfast, Northern Ireland, was probably best known as a poet, but was also a prose essayist, a book reviewer, a radio broadcaster and script writer, a lecturer and, latterly, a teacher, as well as a former Presbyterian minister.

== Early life ==
He was born in Belfast and grew up in Mountpottinger in the east of the city. At school he showed a talent for writing and went on to read English at Queen's University Belfast where he won a number of prizes for literary essays, graduating in 1931. On completion of his degree, he entered Presbyterian Theological College and was ordained as a Presbyterian minister in 1935. He was first appointed to Loughgall Presbyterian Church, Loughgall, County Armagh, where he was minister for 12 years. In 1936 he married Marie Harden Waddell, a medical doctor who set up practice in the village. Awake! and Other Poems (1941) was given glowing reviews in Britain and America, although the first edition was almost totally lost when the publisher's warehouse was destroyed in the London Blitz. His wife became ill (later diagnosed as schizophrenia) and they left Loughgall temporarily in 1943, she to seek treatment, he to write in Oxford. He returned to Loughgall after a year but resigned from his ministry in 1946 to take up post at the BBC in London as a scriptwriter for the newly established BBC Third Programme after being approached by Louis MacNeice and offered a post. He involved himself in the Regionalist movement among Ulster writers in the 1940s and 1950s and contributed to a number journals which were used as a vehicle for the regionalist movement such as Lagan, The Bell and Rann. He collaborated with Louis MacNeice in the unpublished The Character of Ireland.

== Later life ==
Rodgers stayed at the BBC as a full-time producer and scriptwriter until 1953 when he went free-lance. He produced a highly innovative series of radio broadcasts on Irish literary figures: Irish literary portraits. He was elected a life member of the Irish Academy of Letters in 1951 to fill the vacancy due to the death of George Bernard Shaw and was a member of the Literature and Poetry Panel of the Arts Council of Great Britain and a board member of the Arts Council of Northern Ireland. His wife died in 1953, following a period of illness. In the same year he married Marianne Gilliam (née Helweg), the ex-wife of his immediate boss in the BBC, Lawrence Gilliam. They lived in England until 1966 when Rodgers secured a post as writer in residence at Pitzer College in Claremont, California and later a lecturing post at California State Polytechnic University. In 1968 he was awarded a life annuity of £100 by the Arts Council of Ireland as an acknowledgement of his distinction in letters and of the honour which his literary work had reflected on Ireland. He died in 1969 in Los Angeles and was buried at Loughgall, County Armagh.

== Works ==
- Awake! And Other Poems (1941)
- The Ulstermen and Their Country (1947)
- Europa and the Bull (1952) (poems)
- Ireland in Colour (1957) (prose)
- The Return Room (1955) (radio play)
- Essex Roundabout (1963) (prose)
- Collected Poems (1971)
- Irish Literary Portraits (1972)
