= Maurice Wilkes (disambiguation) =

Maurice Wilkes (1913–2010) was a computer scientist at the University of Cambridge.

Maurice Wilkes may also refer to:

- Maurice Wilks (1904–1963), automotive and aeronautical engineer
- Maurice Canning Wilks (1910–1984), Irish landscape painter

== See also ==
- Maurice Wilk (died 1963), American violinist
- Maurice Wilkins (1916–2004), Nobel laureate and physicist
