= Rann (magazine) =

Northern Irish literary magazine

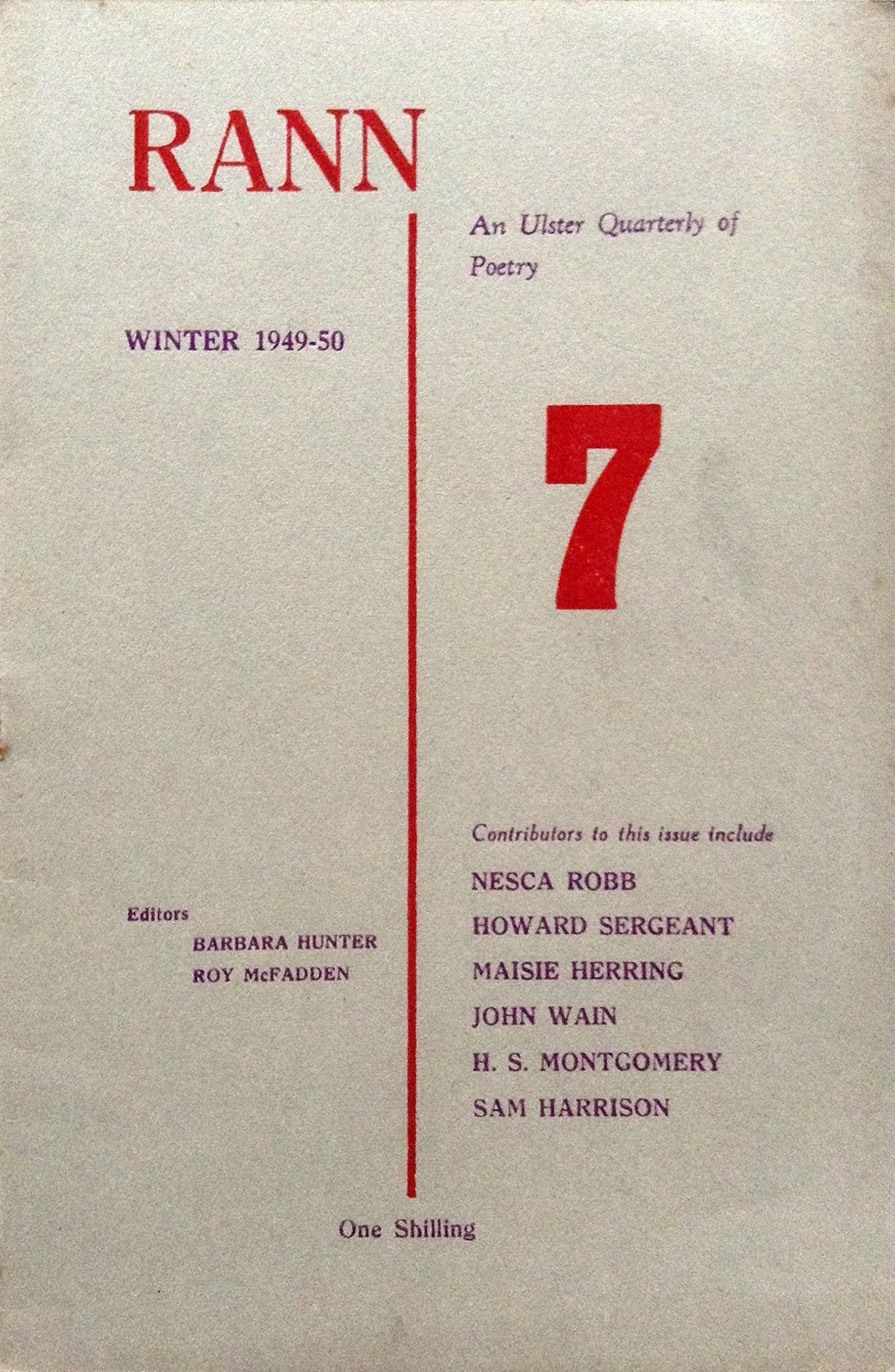

Rann was the first poetry journal ever produced in Northern Ireland. It was founded and edited by Lisburn based writers Roy McFadden and Barbara Hunter in 1948, aiming to provide a platform for young, aspiring poets. The editorial policy was unapologetically regionalist. The title of the periodical means "verse" in Irish. The magazine was published quarterly and ran for five years, with some twenty issues published between 1948 and 1953.

The first edition stated that Rann aimed to give, "this region an opportunity to find its voice and to express itself in genuine accents in these pages." The subtitle to the first edition was A Quarterly of Ulster Poetry, however by the second issue this had changed to An Ulster Quarterly of Poetry exposing editorial concerns that there may not have been enough Ulster verse to fill its pages. By issue number thirteen the subtitle had the additional words "and comment" added, allowing for the introduction of theatre and radio criticism.

The first edition was sold for one shilling and comprised poetry and prose by established writers such as John Hewitt, Michael McLaverty and John Boyd. John Hewitt estimated that around one-hundred writers made contributions over the lifetime of the magazine, including many from throughout the United Kingdom, such as Kingsley Amis and R S Thomas. The editorial team's greatest success was with the first publication of William Butler Yeats's Civil War poem, Reprisals, facilitated by the Yeats's family friend and scholar, Oliver Edwards. The covers of Rann were designed by established artists including Raymond Piper, Anne Yeats, Paul Nietsche and William Conor. The first cover was designed by Rowel Friers.

The magazine's final edition contained the most comprehensive bibliography of Ulster writers since the turn of the century. Following the publication of the final edition Roy McFadden commented, "I explained that tiredness, not need of cash or an increased circulation, had convinced us that five years had been a brave innings: that enough was enough."
