= Christopher Maccabe =

Professor Christopher George Maccabe CB (born 17 December 1946) is a former Political Director of the Northern Ireland Office, and a former British Joint Secretary of the British Irish Intergovernmental Conference. Since 2006 he has been involved in conflict resolution and political development in various parts of the world, including Sri Lanka, Kosovo, the Middle East, Tanzania, Iraq, Lebanon, Cameroon and Colombia. He is a member of a team appointed by the Minister of Justice in Northern Ireland to oversee the August 2010 agreement between the Minister and dissident republican prisoners in Maghaberry Prison. He was a member of the International Verification Commission in the Basque Country that monitored the permanent ceasefire declared by ETA at the beginning of 2011. The Commission's work came to an end in April 2017 when it oversaw ETA's final act of decommissioning its weapons and explosive. He is Chair of Enterprise Media Ireland CIC, a Director of the Forum for Cities in Transition (Belfast) Ltd, a Director of the Center for Democracy and Peace Building, and a member of the New Ireland Commission. He was educated at Brackenber House School, the Royal Belfast Academical Institution, Queen's University Belfast and the University of London. He is the son of Max (died 2000) and Gladys Maccabe MBE (died 2018), a renowned Irish artist. He is married to Jenny and has three children and ten grandchildren.

== Career highlights ==
He joined the Northern Ireland Cabinet Office as a researcher in 1971 and was appointed Assistant Private Secretary to the Chief Minister of Northern Ireland, Brian Faulkner in December 1973. After the fall of the power sharing Executive in May 1974 he served as Private Secretary to successive British Ministers in Northern Ireland between 1974 and 1977. Between 1980 and 1984 he was Special Assistant to the Chief Constable of the Royal Ulster Constabulary, Sir John Hermon, and a Director of the Northern Ireland Prison Service from 1988 to 1992. He was Head of the Northern Ireland Office's Political Affairs Division from 1992 to 2000; and Political Director of the NIO and British Joint Secretary of the British-Irish Intergovernmental Conference from 2000 to 2008. During that time he was deeply involved in negotiations (public and private) with all the political parties in Northern Ireland, the Irish Government and paramilitary groups.

== Significant appointments ==
Member, Life Sentence Review Board, 1988–2000 board member, Institute for Advancement of Women in Politics, Queen's University Belfast, 2003–2006; Chairman, Board of Governors, Victoria College, Belfast, 2002–2009 (and member between 1989 and 2017); Independent Chair, Belfast Conflict Resolution Consortium, 2014–2017; Honorary Fellow, Institute of Irish Studies, University of Liverpool; Visiting lecturer, Dickinson College, Pennsylvania, 2010.

== Honours and qualifications ==
He was appointed a Companion of the Most Honourable Order of the Bath (CB) by her Majesty Queen Elizabeth II in 2004. In March 2020 he was appointed Honorary Professor of Practice of Conflict Resolution in the Institute for Global Peace, Security and Justice at Queen's University Belfast. He is a Fellow of the Royal Society of Arts (FRSA) and holds bachelor's and master's degrees in law.

== Publications ==
'The British and Peace in Northern Ireland' (Cambridge University Press 2015). Chapter 'Strategy, tactics and space.'
