= Noreen Rice =

Artist born in Belfast

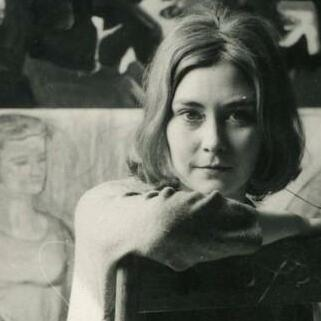
- Born: 19 February 1936; Belfast, Northern Ireland
- Died: 23 March 2015 (aged 79); County Monaghan, Ireland
- Children: Tristram Giff, Trasna Cryer

Noreen Rice (19 February 1936 – 23 March 2015) was an artist born in Belfast, Northern Ireland, UK. She exhibited for fifty years and worked in the US, France and Switzerland and her work is included in the United Nations collection.

== Life ==
Rice was born in Belfast in 1936. Her parents were Nell (born Hayes) and Johnny Rice. Her mother could sing and her father was a master mason. Her mothers singing brought in extra money after her father was posted overseas during World War Two. She went to Methodist College in Belfast and by the age of fourteen she was living in the family home with lodgers as her parents were in Africa where her father was working. A school friend said that all she ever wanted to do was draw.

The artist Gerard Dillon came from Belfast. Dillon helped Rice after they were introduced to each other by Tom Davidson, Rice's piano teacher in 1951. He was friends with the painter George Campbell. They both shared "an interest in bohemian characters". She regarded both Dillon and Campbell as her mentors and her work was of a similar surrealistic and primitive style.

In 1956 she had her first solo exhibition at the British Council in Hong Kong where her father had been posted. When she returned to London she earned money working night shifts in the BBC news room.

Gerard Dillon and his sister, Mollie, had a property on Abbey Road in 1958. They let off part of the house to artist Arthur Armstrong and they let a flat to Noreen Rice and her brother Hal. Dillon and Rice would tour junk yards to find objects like leather and string that they included in their artwork. The house was known for its ex-pat Irish artists which also included Aidan Higgins and Gerard Keenan.

In 1963 she was part of a delegation of 30 artists invited to represent Ireland on a cultural exchange to the United States where they exhibited in Washington DC and New York. She had to be persuaded by Gerard Dillon and George Campbell to meet John F Kennedy at the White House at the end of the tour. Pleased that she did, she was struck by his charisma and he was full of talk of his recent trip to Ireland. This was three weeks before he was killed in Dallas and Rice, back working in London at the BBC was locked in the newsroom for a week while the story unfolded.

She became a regular exhibitor in London and Dublin before moving to Paris in 1967 where she married sculptor Haïm Kern in 1970 and took up lithography. There she also worked with the American publisher Maria Jolas on works of both James Joyce and Samuel Beckett. Their son Tristram was born but the marriage lasted only a few years and Rice left for Geneva with her young son after receiving a bursary from the Swiss Government to study etching.

Working mostly in pastels and oils, she often drew on Celtic imagery for her dreamy, poetic images. Jacques Lassaigne, director of Paris's Museum of Modern Art, said she created "a strange and primitive universe, suspended between two skies... in these figures and symbols... one may read the secret of the silent life patiently reconstructed".

She returned to Ireland in 1973 to live in Fermanagh. She married again in 1977 and had her daughter, Trasna. She continued to paint and exhibit in Ireland and held regular residencies in the Tyrone Guthrie Centre Annamakerrig in Co. Monaghan. In 1997 a large collaboration with Felix Anaut resulted in images of Adam and Eve which was prepared for a Spanish arts festival which was near Zaragosa. Another large commission was to decorate the shutters of Pushkin House at Baronscourt for the Duchess of Abercorn in 2005.

== Death and legacy ==
Rice died in County Monaghan in 2015 where she had lived for twenty years. She had completed her last exhibition in 2009, over fifty years after her first in Hong Kong. She had exhibited and had her work in notable collections including the United Nations. She was noted for only creating art when she wanted to, she had never conformed, Aeneas Bonner said in her obituary "Normality was a not a close acquaintance".

“Noreen Rice is an original . . . curious that her place in Irish painting is not higher than it is . . . certainly no other artist in the country can handle pastel on this scale . . . although she owes something to Chagall she is strikingly original and also quite strikingly Celtic. “

“...she seems almost a throwback to the early Living Art days, and even further back to the days of Jack Yeats and AE.” Brian Fallon, Art Critic, Irish Times

"Creativity has been described as pulling the pail up from the well, or of holding the end of the golden thread," she said. "Images for me are surprises which emerge of their own volition, invite the viewer to participate again in the collective subconscious."

The golden thread she grasped brought her to Hong Kong, London, Paris, Geneva and back to her native Ireland in a career spanning more than half a century. Her works hang in collections from Tokyo to the United Nations in New York.
