= Mary O'Malley (director) =

Irish theatre director

- Born: Mary Margaret Hickey; July 28, 1918; Mallow, County Cork, Ireland
- Died: April 22, 2006 (aged 87); Booterstown, County Dublin, Ireland
- Occupation: Theatre director

Mary Margaret O'Malley (née Hickey; 28 July 1918 Mallow, County Cork – 22 April 2006 Booterstown, County Dublin) was an Irish theatre director and, with her husband Pearse, co-founder of Belfast's Lyric Players Theatre, now typically known as the Lyric Theatre, Belfast.

== Life ==
On 14 September 1947, Mary married County Armagh-born psychiatrist Pearse O’Malley in University Church, Dublin and soon afterwards moved to Belfast.

She was elected to Belfast Corporation in 1951, as an Irish Labour Party councillor for the Smithfield ward.

O'Malley was appointed as an honorary member of the Ulster Society of Women Artists in 1958. In 1959, she founded Threshold literary magazine.

In March 1951, she started Belfast’s Lyric Players Theatre, initially at Ulsterville House and, the following year, in the former stables at the back of her home in Derryvolgie Avenue, off the Malone Road.

In October 1968 a new, purpose-built Lyric Theatre opened on Ridgeway Street. The date of the official opening was chosen by O'Malley as a homage to US President John F. Kennedy's Amherst address, 26 October 1963, in which he affirmed the role of the artist in society.

In 1976, she retired in Wicklow. Her autobiography, Never Shake Hands with the Devil, was published in 1990.

The Lyric Players Theatre archives are held at NUI Galway.
