= Jack P. Hanlon =

Irish painter (1913–1968)

John Paul "Jack" Hanlon (6 May 1913 – 12 August 1968) was an Irish Roman Catholic priest and painter. He was born in Templeogue, Dublin on 6 May 1913. He was educated at Belvedere College and went on to study for the priesthood in 1932 at Clonliffe College while also studying at University College Dublin.

He studied painting in Belgium and Spain and won a scholarship to study in Paris under André Lhote. He completed his clerical training at St. Patrick’s College, Maynooth and was ordained there in 1939.

Hanlon won the Douglas Hyde prize and the Arts Council prize for a painting of a historical subject. Predominantly a watercolourist, he did produce some oil on canvas painting. During the 1940s, he designed christmas cards for Victor Waddington; he had also exhibited in Waddington's gallery in Dublin prior to its closure. His work was also part of the painting event in the art competition at the 1948 Summer Olympics.

He was a founding member of the Irish Exhibition of Living Art. He served as curate in Churchtown, Dublin, until his death aged 55 on 12 August 1968. Many of his works are on public display in churches and in art galleries. Stations Of The Cross and Recreation (oil on canvas) is in the Crawford Art Gallery, Cork; The Golden Cage (oil on canvas) is in the Highlanes Gallery, Drogheda; and Firey Leaves (watercolour on paper) is in the National Gallery of Ireland.

In 2013, five watercolours by Hanlon, were stolen from Our Lady of the Rosary Church in Limerick.
