= Walter Francis Clokey =

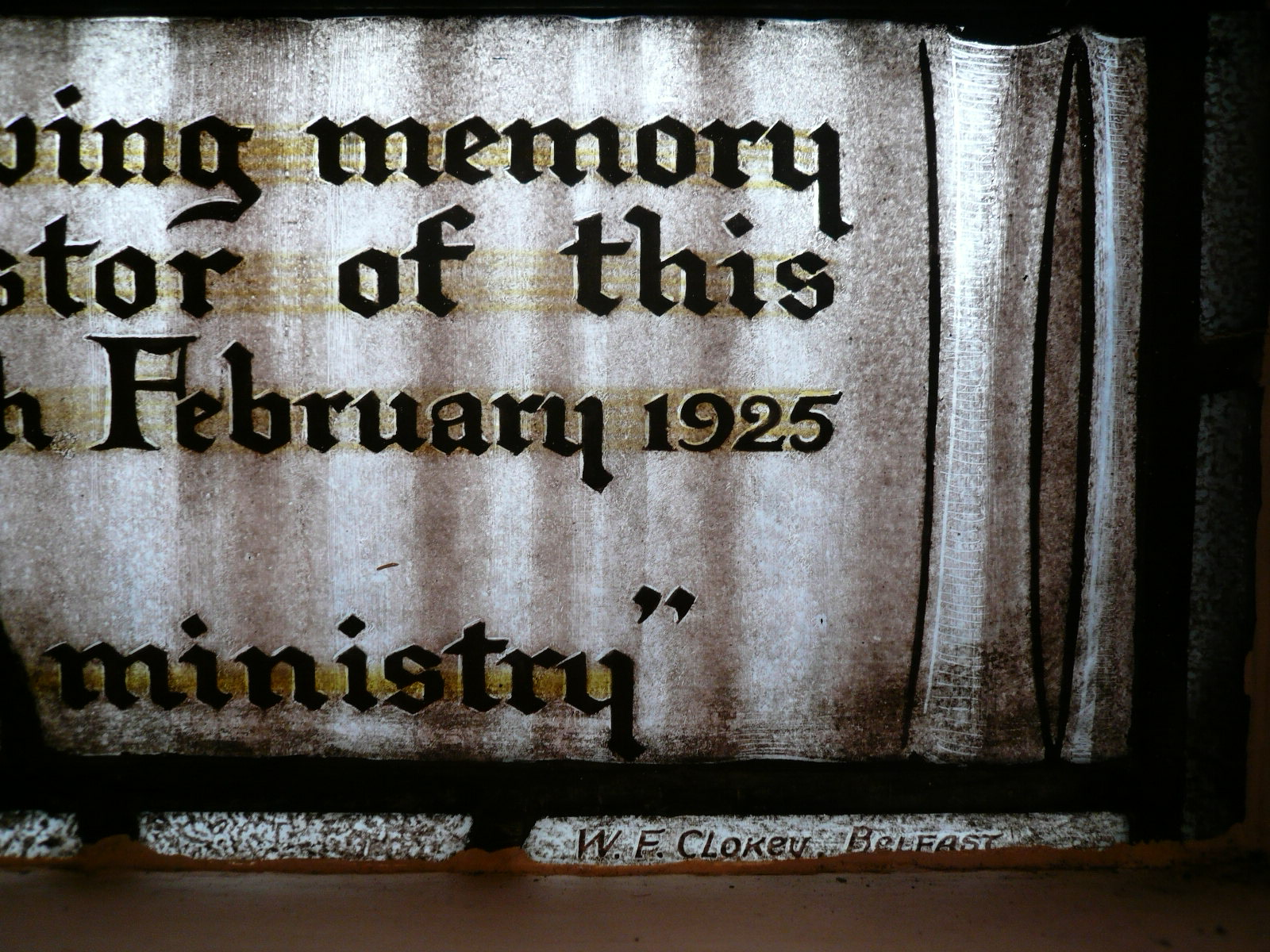
Maker's mark from c.1925

Walter Francis Clokey (c.1870–1930) was a British stained glass artist and manufacturer who resided in Belfast, Northern Ireland. He was president of the Belfast Wholesale Merchants and Manufacturers' Association, and councillor of the Belfast City Council. In 1928 he was elected as councillor by the Belfast Corporation into a special committee of six members with extensive powers to reorganize Belfast's civic affairs.

Clokey worked for the glass merchants Campbell Brothers of Belfast. In 1904 he went into partnership with his former employer and founded the Clokey Stained Glass Studios. His first stained glass artist was Mr. Wren. Francis Ward, founder of Ward and Partners of Belfast, joined the studio in 1925. Other artists who worked for Clokey Studios were Olive Henry, John Blyth, Ronnie Shaw, Daniel Braniff, Jack Calderwood, and James Watson.

He was responsible for most of the early- to mid-twentieth-century ecclesiastical stained glass in Northern Ireland. They were the primary competitors of Ward and Partners of Belfast.

The business of the Clokey Stained Glass Studios continued after his death until c. 1972 under the direction of his son, Harold W. Clokey, who died in 1993. A collection of the stained glass window designs of Clokey Studios is preserved by the Northern Ireland Monuments and Buildings Record.

== Works ==
- c.1925, Window in First Presbyterian Church of Carrickfergus, County Antrim, Northern Ireland
- c.1952, "Peter Scott Martin Memorial Stained Glass Window" with Clokeys of Belfast maker’s mark, second window to left of north nave wall in St. Eugene's Church of Ireland Church (Ardstraw Parish Church) (1724), Newtownstewart, County Tyrone, Northern Ireland BT78 4AA
