= Hilary Heron =

Irish sculptor

- Born: Hilary Mary Heron; 27 March 1923; Dublin, Ireland
- Died: 28 April 1977 (aged 54); Dublin

Hilary Heron (27 March 1923 – 28 April 1977) was an Irish sculptor who exhibited with the Irish Exhibition of Living Art and represented Ireland at the 1956 Venice Biennale.

== Early life and education ==
Hilary Heron was born in Dublin on 27 March 1923. Her parents were James Heron, bank official, and Mary Elizabeth. Heron spent her childhood in Coleraine, County Londonderry, and New Ross, County Wexford, attending John Ivory's one-teacher school but was mostly privately educated. She went on to the National College of Art and Design (NCAD) in Dublin, winning three successive Taylor art scholarships from the Royal Dublin Society.

== Career ==
Heron was one of the original members of the Irish Exhibition of Living Art, exhibiting there in 1943. Her 1944 piece, Chessmen in walnut, was lauded for its level of sophistication and originality with a "witty invention". By the time she graduated from NCAD, Heron had a reputation as a nonconformist. In 1945 she exhibited Horse with the Royal Hibernian Academy, followed by Dawn in 1946 and Comedy and tragedy in 1947. Heron was awarded the inaugural Mainie Jellett memorial travelling scholarship in 1947, with which she studied Romanesque carving in Italy and France. She continued to exhibit with the Irish Exhibition of Living Art with works such as her 1949 Danaan woman. Her 1947 bust of James Connolly was chosen in 2015 to be a part of the Royal Irish Academy's Modern Ireland in 100 Artworks series.

In 1950, Heron held her first solo show at Victor Waddington's gallery in Dublin, with a second solo show in 1953. 1953 saw her work included at the contemporary Irish art exhibition at Aberystwyth, Wales. She travelled widely and drew on a wide range of influences, and in the 1950s she began to work with metal. She represented Ireland at the 1956 Venice Biennale with Louis le Brocquy. She often used religious themes in her exhibits, drawing influence from African and Sumerian carving and the work of Picasso. Heron was commissioned by the Irish government in 1958 to exhibit at an Irish exhibition in New York. Her first English exhibition, at the London Waddington Galleries, in 1960 showed more than 30 works including Squares in different places and Bird barking.

Heron also had a keen interest in gardening and botany, and spent a great deal of her spare time devoted to charities which cared for the elderly and ill. She also began to learn Irish later in life. She married the Celtic scholar David Greene in 1959. She was an active member of Cumann Merriman, and was appointed a member of the RTÉ authority in the 1970s. Heron died in Dublin on 28 April 1977. Papers relating to Heron are held in both the Irish Museum of Modern Art and National Irish Visual Arts Library.
