= Maïlys Seydoux-Dumas =

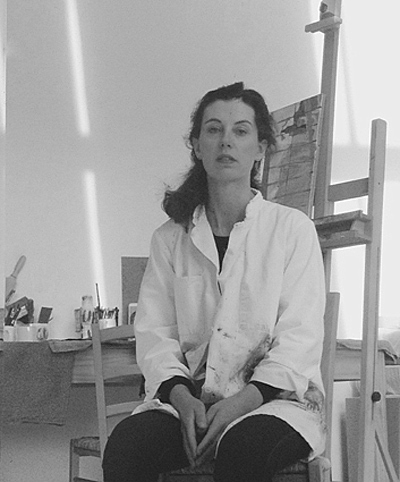
- Maïlys Seydoux-Dumas in her studio
- Born: 22 June 1967 (age 58); Saumur, France

Maïlys Seydoux-Dumas (born 1967) is a French visual artist known for her work in painting, engraving, tapestry, and jewellery design. Her work often explores everyday life, memory, and the interplay between objects and their environment. She lives and works in Paris and Haute-Normandie, France.

== Early life and education ==
Maïlys Seydoux-Dumas was born on 22 June 1967 in Saumur, France. Following a high school education in Varengeville-sur-Mer, she studied between 1986 and 1988 at Penninghen, the School of Art Direction and Interior Architecture in Paris. Subsequently, she enrolled at the École Nationale Supérieure des Arts Décoratifs (ENSAD) in Paris, graduating in 1992, with a specialisation in printed image and engraving. In 1993, she completed further training in engraving under the guidance of Jean Clerté.

== Career ==
Maïlys Seydoux-Dumas' work encompasses printmaking, etching, painting, and decorative arts. She creates tapestries, a line of jewelry, and figurative artworks that often feature self-portraits and intimate views of her studio. Many of her tapestries are created in collaboration with the artist Haïm Kern, whose poetry inspires her work.

Since 1997, Seydoux-Dumas has participated in numerous solo and group exhibitions in France, Belgium, Switzerland, and the Netherlands. Since 2022, she has collaborated with the gallery MiniMasterpiece.

She works in her studio in the 17th arrondissement of Paris and in Varengeville-sur-Mer.

== Selected exhibitions ==
=== 2000s ===
- 2000 – Vue d’Atelier, Maison Henri IV, Saint-Valery-en-Caux, France
- 2003 – Prélude Prélude, Galerie Koralewski, Paris, France
- 2006 – Vues d’Atelier, Galerie Koralewski, Paris, France
- 2007 – St-Art Art Fair, Galerie Koralewski, Strasbourg, France

=== 2010s ===
- 2010 – Portraits, Galerie Koralewski, Paris, France
- 2015 – Des Miroirs et des Fenêtres, City Hall, Varengeville-sur-Mer, France
- 2016 – Éclats, Galerie Fred Lanzenberg, Brussels, Belgium
- 2019 – Histoire de Peintre, Centre Culturel, Médiathèque Alexandre Dumas, Villers-Cotterêts, France

=== 2020s ===
- 2020 – Bleu Or Rose, Galerie Sagot le-Garrec, Paris, France
- 2020 – Le rideau se lève aux Acacias, Scène d’atelier, Domaine du Château de Varengeville-sur-Mer, France
- 2022 – Galerie Mini Masterpiece, Paris, France Art Fair
- 2022 – Une Étoile au Théâtre, Le Salon Vert, Carouge, Geneva, Switzerland
