= Anna Cheyne =

Irish artist

Anna Cheyne HRUA
- Born: Anne M. Newbolt; 9 April 1926; London, England
- Died: 10 September 2002 (aged 76); Lisburn, County Antrim, Northern Ireland
- Education: Kingston School of Art; Slade School of Fine Art
- Known for: Sculpture
- Style: Abstract
- Spouse: Donald Cheyne

Anna Cheyne HRUA (9 April 1926 – 10 September 2002) was a British artist and sculptor working with diverse media including batik, ceramics, papier mâché, stone, fibreglass and bronze. Cheyne was born and educated in England but moved to Northern Ireland after her marriage to architect Donald Cheyne.

== Biography ==
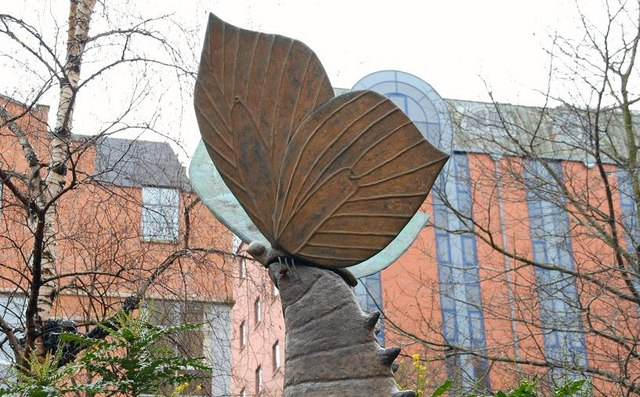
Regeneration (1993), Bronze & fibreglass, Blackstaff Square, Belfast

Born Anne M. Newbolt, she left school at the age of thirteen and worked as a farmhand for two years before studying at Kingston School of Art where she gained a National Diploma in Design in Painting and Sculpture. She then continued her studies at the Slade School of Fine Art where she received the Slade Diploma in Painting and Sculpture. Cheyne married the Belfast born architect Donald Cheyne in 1950 and the couple moved to Belfast in 1954.

Cheyne founded and ran a company that supplied pottery materials to artists until 1982, when she sold the business to concentrate fully on her art. Subsequently she worked in a wide range of mediums that included pottery and painting but it is as a sculptor that she was best known having received a number of public commissions. Amongst the first of Cheyne's public works was her ornamental plasterwork design for a ceiling in the Old Town Hall, Belfast in 1982. Other notable public commissions include a 1994 bronze plaque for the National Maternity Hospital, Dublin; a coat of arms for the headquarters of the Northern Ireland Fire Authority at Lisburn in 1991; Regeneration for Blackstaff Square, Belfast, in 1993; and My Lady of Chimney Corner for Antrim Borough Council in 1998. To mark the one-hundredth anniversary of the Balmoral Show in 1996 the Royal Ulster Agricultural Society commissioned Cheyne to produce a six-foot bronze depicting agricultural scenes over the previous century.

Cheyne had a number of solo shows during her career including at the Peacock Gallery, Craigavon in 1984, at the Rooksmoor Gallery in Bath in 1988 and at the Cavehill Galley in Belfast during 1991. In 1988 she took part in a Dublin ceramic workshop led by Eduardo Paolozzi. Cheyne debuted with the Royal Ulster Academy of Arts in 1978 where she showed two ceramic sculptures. She joined the Royal Ulster Academy Association in the mid-1980s. In 1990 Cheyne became an Associate of the Royal Ulster Academy where she was elected an Academician in 1994. She was a member of the Sculptors' Society of Ireland and the Association of Artists of Ireland. The Ulster Arts Club Gallery hosted a solo exhibition of Cheyne's paintings and sculpture in 1994. In the same year Cheyne showed in a two person exhibition at the Cavehill Gallery, Belfast, and she was a prizewinner at the Ulster Arts Club Small Works show. In 1995 Cheyne was one of thirteen artists inducted into The National Self-Portrait Collection of Ireland, along with fellow Ulster artists Alicia Boyle and George Russell. Her self-portrait was a 'personal exercise' in which she experimented with batik, exploring the possibilities for its use in portraiture.

Cheyne was a member of the South Antrim branch of the Alliance Party, and a founding member of the Lisburn branch of Women Together a peace group chaired by Saidie Patterson. The group were actively promoting peace throughout Northern Ireland by supporting working class women who were facing financial hardship and sectarian strife.

== Death and legacy ==
Anna Cheyne died at Lisburn's Lagan Valley Hospital in September 2002. She outlived her husband but she was survived by three daughters and two sons. Lisburn City Council presented a posthumous retrospective of Cheyne's work at the Island Arts Centre in 2003, and another in 2008. The Anna Cheyne Visual Art Award, inaugurated in 2003, was named after her. It is a biennial competition for artists with the winning works being purchased by the Lisburn City Art Collection for permanent display.

Cheyne's work can be seen in many public collections including those of the Northern Ireland Civil Service, The National Self-Portrait Collection of Ireland, and Royal Ulster Academy Diploma Collection.
