= Ward & Partners of Belfast =

Northern Irish glass manufacturer

- Company type: Private
- Industry: Stained glass
- Founded: 1894; 131 years ago
- Founder: Francis Edward Ward
- Defunct: c. 1925-1930
- Headquarters: Belfast, Northern Ireland

Ward & Partners of Belfast were a Northern Irish stained glass manufacturer in the late-19th century and early-20th century that predominantly focused on ecclesiastical commissions. It was founded by Francis Edward Ward, with both him and William J. Douglas being key people in the company. Douglas left in 1918 to start his own business, and the company became defunct some time between 1925 and 1930, when Ward also left to became the head of Clokey's stained glass division.

They were the principal competitors in Northern Ireland of Clokey Studios, founded by Walter Francis Clokey.

== Works ==
- Robert Johnstone Memorial Stained Glass Window (c.1918) in First Presbyterian Church of Carrickfergus, Carrickfergus, County Antrim, Northern Ireland
