= Alice Berger Hammerschlag =

Austrian artist (1917–1969)

- Born: Alice Berger; 18 February 1917; Vienna, Austria
- Died: 14 July 1969 (aged 52); Belfast, Northern Ireland
- Education: Kunstgewerbeschule, Vienna; Vienna Academy of Arts
- Known for: Abstract painting, design

Alice Berger Hammerschlag née Berger (18 February 1917 – 14 July 1969) was an Austrian artist. She settled in Belfast and while creating abstract paintings also had a number of creative and administrative roles in Northern Ireland.

== Biography ==
Hammerschlag was born in Vienna and studied art between 1929 and 1938 under Franz Cižek at the Kunstgewerbeschule and at the Vienna Academy of Arts. In 1938 she moved to Belfast, as a refugee on a British government permit for graphic designers, to avoid persecution under the Nazi regime. Her older sister, Trudi, came to Britain with her, but the two appear to have led separate lives once in the UK, with Trudi becoming a linguist and teacher, eventually leading a team at York University in its Language Centre.

In Northern Ireland Hammerschlag did design work for commercial publishers and, later, designed theatre sets for the Lyric Theatre Belfast, where she worked alongside, and became a close friend of, the choreographer and Holocaust survivor, Helen Lewis. In 1941 the Ulster Academy of Arts published a portfolio of her lithographs in aid of the Ulster Hospital for Children and Women. Hammerschlag showed three paintings at the Ulster Academy of Arts in 1942 and again in 1944. Between 1950 and 1961 she showed a further seventeen works at the Academy. Hammerschlag was active in the running of the Lyric's New Gallery in Belfast and in 1959 had her first solo exhibition at the New Vision Centre Gallery in London.

Further exhibitions of her work followed at Queen's University in Belfast, at the Avgarde Gallery in Manchester and, in 1965 and 1968, at the Dawson Gallery in Dublin. She participated in the Irish Exhibition of Living Art at Belfast in 1955. She also showed with the Living Art Exhibition in 1961, and between 1964 and 1967 inclusive. She also had exhibitions in Europe and the United States, at the United Nations, Rome in 1963, at the Ulster Office, London in 1966, the Gallery Creuze, Paris in 1967, and in 1968 and 1969 at the Salon International in Cannes.

In 1959 the Council for the Encouragement of Music and the Arts, CEMA, sponsored a show of eighteen abstract paintings by Hammerschlag at the Piccolo Gallery in Belfast. CEMA also hosted Hammerschlag's work in their Chicester Street Gallery in 1962 where her paintings included a series based on W. B. Yeats' The Death of Cuchulain. Hammerschlag also exhibited in numerous group shows with the Arts Council of Northern Ireland, including 9 Ulster Artists, a travelling exhibition that visited Edinburgh in 1963, as well as the second and third Open Painting Exhibitions in 1964 and 1966 at the Ulster Museum. In the 1960s Hammerschlag also designed theatre sets for companies in Belfast and Dublin, including the Lyric where she was engaged as a set designer. These included sets for productions of Ibsen's Brand in 1961, for Stravinsky's The Soldier's Tale in 1965 and, also in 1965, The Death of Cuchulain by W. B. Yeats.

Hammerschlag was a member of the Women's International Art Club and the Free Painters and Sculptors. When the Ulster Society of Women Artists was established in 1957, Hammerschlag was appointed as joint honorary secretary with her friend Deborah Brown. Her early paintings were abstract works and she remained an abstract artist throughout her career but increasingly included more overtly rhythmic patterns in her work. The Ulster Museum, the Royal Society of Arts and the Arts Council of Northern Ireland hold examples of her work. A memorial exhibition of her work was held by the Arts Council Gallery in Belfast in 1970 and an award for artists was set up in her name by her husband, the musician Heinz Hammerschlag.
