= Haïm Kern =

German-born French sculptor, painter and engraver (1930–2024)

- Born: 4 December 1930; Leipzig, Saxony, Germany
- Died: 5 March 2024 (aged 93); Paris, France
- Education: Beaux-Arts de Paris
- Occupations: Sculptor; Painter; Engraver

Haïm Kern (4 December 1930 – 5 March 2024) was a German-born French sculptor, painter, and engraver.

== Biography ==
Born in Leipzig on 4 December 1930, Kern's family fled the Nazi regime in 1933, settling in France. From 1953 to 1958, he studied at the Beaux-Arts de Paris.

In 1970 Haïm Kern married Irish abstract artist Noreen Rice and adopted her young son Tristram. They lived and worked together in Paris until they separated, finally divorcing in 1976.

In 1988, the Ministry of Culture tasked he and four other artists with created works commemorating the Armistice of 11 November 1918. In 1998, he erected a monument on the Plateau de Californie, near Craonne. Prime Minister Lionel Jospin inaugurated the monument on 5 November 1998. Additionally, "La Chanson de Craonne", a French song from World War I, reignited in popularity after the inauguration within the commune, which sat at the heart of the Chemin des Dames.

On 12 August 2014, the note stating "Ils n'ont pas choisi leur sépulture" ("They did not choose their burial") was stolen. The thieves stole 1.6 tonnes of bronze and escaped. On 16 April 2017, a replica of the note was inaugurated by President François Hollande. This time, it was installed in the Caverne du Dragon, a few kilometers from its previous location. In 2016, the original thieves were found and convicted.

In 2010, Kern donated his workshop funds to the General Council of Aisne. In April 2012, his works were displayed at the Musée du Chemin des Dames. In 2020, he collaborated with artist Maïlys Seydoux-Dumas to lead an exposition at the Château de Varengeville-sur-Mer.

Haïm Kern died in Paris on 5 March 2024, at the age of 93.

== Main works ==
- Le Bonnet de police (1944)
- Une Ha ! Attaque de cœur (1970)
- Au diable l'amour (1972)
- L'Haleine du peintre (1976)
- Damiens (1978)
- La Corde à sotter (1978)
- Les Larmes (1978)
- Hommage à Monte-Cristo (1981)
- L'Oreille orientale (1981)
- La Teste (1985)
- Hommage à François Mauriac (1985)
- Claire-Obscure (1987)
- Nom de Dieu (1988)
- Liberté-Égalité-Fraternité (1989)
- Le Sac (1990)
- Le Nuage (1991)
- L'Homme libre (c. early 1990s)
- Liberté (1993)
- Ils n'ont pas choisi leur sépulture (1998)
- Vivre (1999)
- Les Chemins de Pitchipoï (c. 2000)
- Le Convoi (c. 2001)
- Réfléchissez (c. 2001)
- 24 heures en Poméranie (2011)

== Autobiography ==
- Haïm Kern (2021)
