= Frank Egginton =

English painter (1908–1990)

Frank Egginton (10 November 1908 – 7 April 1990) was a British contemporary landscape painter.

He was born in Cheshire, England and educated at Newton Abbot College of Art, Devon, where his father, Wycliffe Egginton, was headmaster.

Egginton painted many scenes in County Donegal, Ireland, visiting there in 1930. He exhibited 19 works at the Royal Hibernian Academy during the 1930s.
