= Violet McAdoo =

Irish painter

- Born: 1900; Cookstown, County Tyrone
- Died: 22 November 1961 (aged 61); Belfast, County Antrim
- Education: Belfast School of Art
- Alma mater: Royal College of Art

Annie Florence Violet McAdoo (1900 -22 November 1961) was an Ulster born watercolour and landscape painter, a graduate from the Royal College of Art, a one time secretary of the Ulster Academy of Arts, and a time served educator.

== Biography ==
McAdoo was born in Cookstown, County Tyrone in 1900, the only daughter of Hugh Weir McAdoo, a draper, and his wife Marion Jones. McAdoo gained a general education at the Ladies' School in Cookstown. She received an art education at the Belfast School of Art, before graduating from the Royal College of Art in 1927. McAdoo returned to Northern Ireland where she taught art for many years at Princess Gardens School in South Belfast until her retirement.

McAdoo was a member of the Belfast Art Society with whom she began exhibiting in 1925. She was to continue showing with their successor organisations, the Ulster Academy and the Royal Ulster Academy, almost every year until her death.

McAdoo was a member of the Watercolour Society of Ireland where she showed 39 works between 1946 and 1960. In 1943 she exhibited at the CEMA sponsored Living Irish Artists exhibition and in a second exhibition of fourteen local watercolour painters. In 1944 she shared the gallery at the Belfast Museum and Art Gallery in a two-person exhibition with Olive Henry. McAdoo presented with watercolours however Henry also presented oils. The pictures were primarily of landscapes but included a number of urban scenes. The Northern Whig's reviewer described McAdoo's work as "...vivid and strong, and she goes in more for heavy dark colours."

McAdoo was one of fourteen artists' work including pictures by Colin Middleton, Romeo Toogood and Kathleen Bridle purchased by the Council for the Encouragement of Music and the Arts in 1946. McAdoo joined her friend Olive Henry at the seventeenth annual show of the National Society of Painters, Sculptors and Engravers in 1950 when her watercolour was one of 550 selected works. McAdoo's work was also shown at the inaugural show of the Association of Past Pupils and Staff at the Belfast College of Art in 1954 alongside T P Flanagan, Colin Middleton and Basil Blackshaw.

McAdoo was one of four vice-presidents of the Ulster Academy of Arts, where she was later to become an Associate. In 1954 she showed in London with the United Society of Artists and with the National Society of whom she was a member. She was also a member of the Society of Women Artists.

== Death and legacy ==
McAdoo died in Belfast City Hospital on 22 November 1961. She never married and had no children. The Royal Ulster Academy showed four of her works posthumously in the annual exhibition of 1962. McAdoo left donations to several charities in her last will and testament, including a bequest of five-hundred pounds to the Royal Ulster Academy of Arts.

McAdoo's work is represented in many private and public collections including the Ulster Museum, and the Royal Ulster Academy of Arts.
