= Ulster Society of Women Artists =

The Ulster Society of Women Artists was founded in 1957 by Gladys Maccabe with the assistance of Olive Henry and others, as there were no arts societies in Northern Ireland that would accept female members. The society aims to

"promote and encourage a high standard of art in Northern Ireland, to maintain a high standard in exhibitions that reflects upon the membership, and to actively seek out and encourage new talent".

The patron of the Society was the Duchess of Abercorn. The first president of the Society was Gladys Maccabe, with Deborah Brown and Alice Berger Hammersclag acting as joint honorary secretaries and Renée Bickerstaff as honorary treasurer. The first committee consisted of Kathleen Bell, Vera Mooney, Elsie Leonard, Elsie Ronaldson and Helen Ross. Honorary members included Mary O'Malley and Dehra Parker. In the early days of the organisation members met in each other's houses before finding a home at the Cathedral Buildings on Donegall Street in December 1958.

Their first exhibition included oils, watercolours, drawings and embroidery and was hosted at the Piccolo Gallery, Belfast in June 1958. USPWA held their First Annual exhibition at the Belfast Museum and Art Gallery in April 1959, where Barbara Hepworth and Norah McGuinness were amongst the invited artists.

At the 1960 Annual General Meeting it was decided that Annual exhibitions be alternated between Belfast, and centres outside Ulster each year. It was further carried that an external juror be appointed each year to select works for inclusion in major exhibitions. Father Jack O'Hanlon selected paintings for the Society's first exhibition in Dublin, hosted by the Brown Thomas Theatre Gallery in 1960.

Membership is by juried selection of submitted works. It takes four years to achieve full membership. The society has expanded membership from the original ten members to one hundred and twenty-five in 2017.
