= George Campbell (painter) =

Irish artist and writer (1917–1979)

- Born: 29 July 1917; Arklow, County Wicklow
- Died: 18 May 1979 (aged 61); Dublin, Ireland
- Resting place: St Kevin's Cemetery, Glendalough, County Wicklow
- Education: Self-taught
- Known for: Painting & writing
- Style: Abstract

(Frederick) George Campbell (29 July 1917 – 18 May 1979) was an Irish artist and writer. Though he grew up in Belfast, Campbell spent much of his adult life living and painting in Spain and Dublin, Ireland.

== Life ==
George Campbell was born in Arklow, County Wicklow, the son of Gretta Bowen (1880-1981) and Matthew Campbell (1866-1925). He attended boarding school in Dublin (Masonic Orphan Boys’ School at Clonskeagh) before moving to Belfast to live with his widowed mother and family.

Campbell was working in an aircraft factory at the time of the Belfast Blitz, and began to paint, taking the bomb-damage as his subject. He was one of the founders of the Irish Exhibition of Living Art in 1943. In the same year along with his brother Arthur (1909-1994) he published a sixteen-page book entitled Ulster in Black and White, that included drawings from the two brothers and their close contemporaries Maurice Wilks and Patricia Webb. Owing to the success of the original publication the brothers then published Now in Ulster (1944), an anthology of short stories, essays and poetry by young Belfast writers.

Campbell held a joint exhibition at the William Mol Gallery, Belfast with his brother Arthur in 1944. In the same year he also showed with Gerard Dillon at the Portadown gallery of John Lamb. In 1946 he showed with the Victor Waddington Gallery in Dublin, where he was to return on a number of occasions. The Council for the Encouragement of Art and Music hosted a solo exhibition in 1949 where he was to show twice more, in 1952 and 1960. He won £500 at the first CEMA Open Painting Competition at the Ulster Museum in 1962. Campbell also showed in one-man exhibitions with the Arts Council of Northern Ireland in 1966 and 1972.

After the war Campbell became increasingly interested in Spain. In 1946 he came to know Spaniards who had settled in Dublin, and when in London painted visiting Spanish dancers in their traditional costume. He first visited Spain in 1951, encouraged by his friendship with Gerard Dillon and "an interest in bohemian characters". Dillon helped Noreen Rice whom he met in 1951. She regarded both Dillon and Campbell as her mentors for decades and her work was of a similar surrealistic and primitive style. In the 1960s Campbell made his home in Ranelagh, Dublin on Florence Terrace, Leeson Park Avenue.

Campbell lived in Spain for six months almost every year throughout much of the following twenty-five years.

Campbell made stained glass windows for Galway Cathedral. He also played flamenco guitar. A member of the Royal Hibernian Academy, he won the Douglas Hyde Gold Medal in 1966 and the Oireachtas Prize for Landscape in 1969. The Spanish government made him a Knight Commander of Spain in 1978.

== Death & legacy ==
George Campbell died in Dublin in May 1979. He was survived by his wife Margaret, his Mother, and two brothers, Arthur and Stanley. After his death the Arts Council of Northern Ireland and An Chomhairle Ealáion joined with the Instituto Cervantes to initiate the George Campbell Memorial Travel Award. In May 2017, Arklow Municipal District Council unveiled two plaques at St. Patrick's Terrace, Arklow, marking George's birthplace and 100 years since his birth.

Campbell's work forms part of many private and public art collections, including Queen's University, Belfast, Ulster Museum, Irish Museum of Modern Art, Hugh Lane Gallery, The National Self-Portrait Collection of Ireland, and Municipal Museum of Antequera, Malaga.

== Books ==
- Ulster in Black and White, Belfast, Campbell, Arthur., and Campbell, George., 1943.
- (ed. with Arthur Campbell) Now in Ulster, Belfast: A. and G. Campbell, 1944.
- (illus.) Guide to the National Monuments in the Republic of Ireland, 1970.
- An eyeful of Ireland, Dublin: A. Figgis, 1973.

== Sources ==
- Reihill, Karen. George Campbell & The Belfast Boys, Summer Loan Exhibition Catalogue, Adams (2015)
- Reihill, Karen. Gerard Dillon, Art and Friendships, Summer Loan Exhibition Catalogue, Adams (2013)
