= James Humbert Craig =

Irish painter (1877–1944)

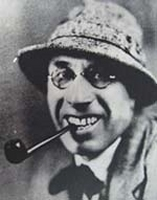
- Born: 12 July 1877; Belfast, Ireland
- Died: 12 June 1944 (aged 66); Cushendall, County Antrim

James Humbert Craig (12 July 1877 in Belfast – 12 June 1944) was an Irish painter.

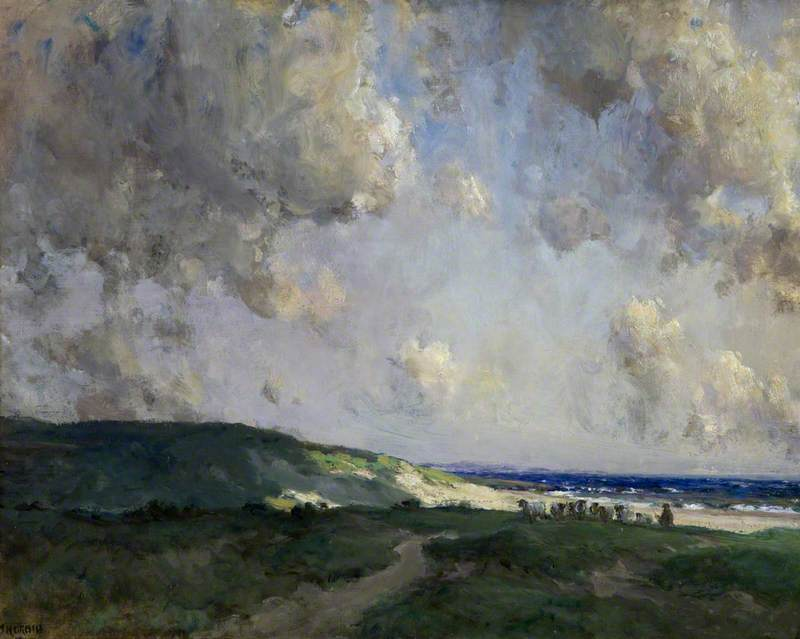
The Kerry Coast (oil on canvas, 1928, now in the Ulster Museum

Craig was born in Belfast to Alexander Craig, a tea merchant, and a Swiss mother, Marie Metzenen, from a family with a painting tradition. He was raised in County Down and maintained a studio at Cushendun, County Antrim. Craig abandoned a career in business, briefly attended the Belfast School of Art, and became a mostly self-taught painter of landscapes. Among his favorite panoramas were County Donegal, Connemara and the Glens of Antrim. Craig was elected to the Royal Ulster Academy and the Royal Hibernian Academy in 1928. He also exhibited at the Fine Art Society in London. His landscapes helped inspire artists like Maurice Canning Wilks. His work was also part of the painting event in the art competition at the 1932 Summer Olympics.

== Early life and family ==
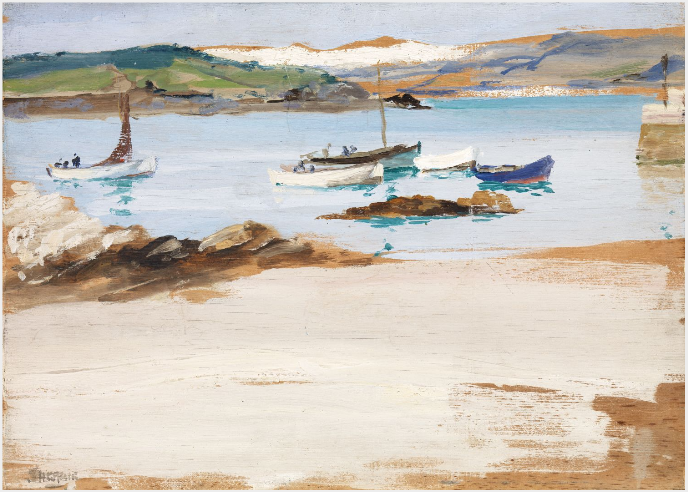
Painting by Craig entitled, "A View of Port na Blagh, Sheephaven Bay, County Donegal"

James Humbert Craig was born at 16 Brougham Street Belfast, on 12 July 1877. Soon after his birth his family moved to Ballyholme Road, Bangor County Down. Here they built a house and named it ‘Craigwelyn’ after the last name of the family. Craig was the son of Alexander Craig, a tea merchant working on tea imports in Belfast. His mother, Marie Sabine Metezzen, was a Swiss native coming from a creative family in Lausanne. This is where Craig got his flair for painting, which he began by using the plywood from the sides of tea chests from his father. Metezzen came to Ireland with a school friend from Switzerland who travelled to Belfast to visit his family working in the Belfast ship building industry. She married Alexander Craig in 1874 in Castlereagh Presbyterian Church, Down. James Craig grew up in a wealthy house where he was privately tutored at home in ‘Craigwelyn’. Craig was a fond lover of sports, his favourite being anything to do with the sea. This fascination was carried into his love of art with him later taking a great amount of time painting the Northern Coast of Ireland. Craig enjoyed sailing, swimming and angling with his father, while being a strong player of rugby and football. He went on to be one of the founders of the Bangor Rugby Club, hoping to inspire many more young boys to take up the sport. The family later moved to 160 Groomsport Road, to which they named the house ‘Craiglea’, in reference once again to the family name, this house was later demolished in 1986. Craig was a very talented boy, taking a fancy with many instruments and playing with the Belfast Philharmonic Orchestra on occasion. As the only son Craig began apprenticing his father at the age of fourteen, he stayed only for a couple of years before enrolling in the Belfast School of Art to continue his love of painting. However, Craig left the college after a term and emigrated to America, he stayed for a short time working small jobs including painting the Brooklyn Bridge while under construction. After witnessing a suicide from the bridge, Craig returned home and began to paint the landscapes he was much more comfortable with - mostly the coast of Ireland.

== Career ==
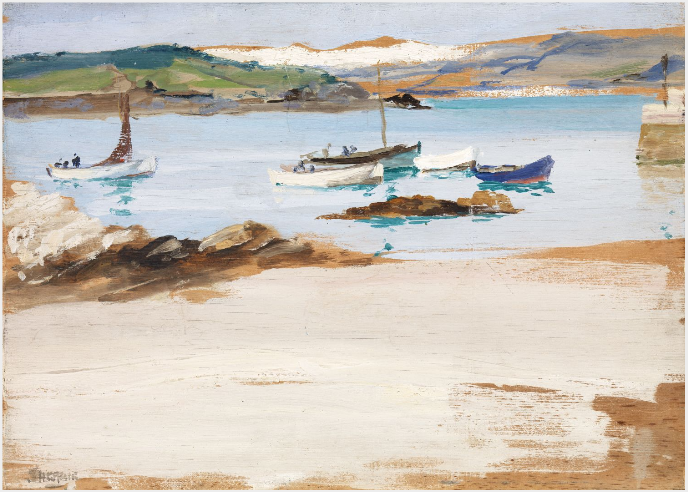
A View of Port na Blagh, Sheephaven Bay, County Donegal.

Craig's first exhibition was in 1915 at the Royal Hibernian Academy. Craig was a member of many different societies and academies in his career. In 1920, he joined the Belfast Art Society until 1930 when it became the Ulster Academy of Arts, of which he also became an elected member. In 1921 he also became a member of another society in Ulster, called the Ulster Society of Painters. 1928 was a successful year for Craig, as he not only exhibited his work in the Fine Arts Society in London, he also became a member of the Royal Hibernian Academy within the year. Craig began to get much recognition nationally and even got the opportunity to represent his country in the 1932 Los Angeles Olympics in the art competition. Craig chose to never paint for money, he only painted when he felt inspired or in a state of mind. Craig travelled all over Europe during his career, including many different countries and regions like North of Spain, Switzerland, and the South of France. Although his favourite place to paint was at home in Ireland where he also felt most inspired. Craig loved to paint outdoors, as it is where he felt most inspired. He once said that “if painters only knew the charm of the Glens they would come from all parts of the world to depict them on canvas". Craig worked right up to his death in 1944, when he travelled to County Donegal to paint until he became ill and had to travel back to the Glens. Craig as an artist steered away from adapting the foreign modernism ideas that were widely spread. Instead, he decided to further develop his desire for Irish subject matter.
