= Maurice Canning Wilks =

Irish landscape painter

Maurice Canning Wilks (1910–1984) was an Irish landscape painter. Born in Belfast in 1910 to a linen designer, he was educated in Belfast at the Malone Public School and attended evening classes at the Belfast College of Art. While attending college he was awarded the Dunville Scholarship allowing him to attend day classes. He went on to exhibit at the Royal Hibernian Academy (RHA) in Dublin where he would one day become an associate member. He was also elected a full member of the Royal Ulster Academy (RUA).

== Career ==
After college, Wilks resided in Cushendun, in the Glens of Antrim. Wilks's early landscapes were mainly of the Irish northern and western counties including Donegal, Antrim and Kerry. He was inspired by the Irish landscapes of James Humbert Craig.

During his career he went on to exhibit internationally in London, Boston, Montreal and Toronto.

In his later years he maintained a summer studio at Sutton where he painted many scenes of the area including Dublin Bay.

His works are in public collections throughout the world including the Ulster Museum, Armagh County Museum, the Ulster Folk and Transport Museum, the Office of Public Works in Dublin and the Limerick City Art Gallery.

Wilks died in 1984.
