= Rowel Friers =

Rowel Friers MBE PPRUA
- Born: 13 April 1920; Belfast, County Antrim
- Died: 21 September 1998 (aged 78); Holywood, County Down
- Education: Belfast School of Art

Rowel Boyd Friers MBE PPRUA (13 April 1920 -21 September 1998) was a cartoonist, illustrator, painter and lithographer.

== Early life and career ==
Friers grew up in the Lagan Village area of Belfast near the Ravenhill Road.

He was apprenticed to the Belfast lithographic firm S. C. Allen and Co, and studied at the Belfast College of Art from 1935 to 1942. He began publishing his cartoons in the 1940s. He began concentrating on political cartooning with the advent of The Troubles in the late 1960s. His work appeared in Punch, the Radio Times, London Opinion, the Daily Express, the Sunday Independent, Dublin Opinion, the Northern Whig, the News Letter, The Irish Times and the Belfast Telegraph.

Aside from cartooning, Friers was a leading figure in the Ulster Watercolour Society, and his oil paintings hang in the National Portrait Gallery, the gallery of the Ulster Museum, and many other collections. He illustrated more than 30 books, including John Pepper's Ulster dialect books and an American edition of the works of W. B. Yeats. He was a keen actor and television performer, with a talent for mimicry, serving as President of the Ulster Association of Drama Festivals and appearing regularly on chat shows. The interior walls of the waiting room in the old McCartney veterinarian clinic on the Upper Knockbreda Road in Belfast were decorated by him with large scale illustrations of pets and their owners in a mix of humorous and educational situations.

He was awarded the MBE in 1977. He was President of the Royal Ulster Academy of Arts from 1993 to 1997.

== Death and legacy ==
Friers died in Holywood, County Down on 21 September 1998. His funeral was attended by a large crowd, including politicians from both sides of the sectarian divide - the SDLP's Lord Fitt and the DUP leader, the Reverend Ian Paisley. He is survived by his wife Yvonne (née Henderson), daughter Vivien and sons Jeremy and Timothy.
