= Roy McFadden =

Northern Irish poet, editor and lawyer (1921–1999)

Roy McFadden (14 November 1921 – 15 September 1999) was a Northern Irish poet, editor, and lawyer.

McFadden's first poem was published before he was thirteen. His earliest influences were from magazines and journals that his Father brought home, and by Palgrave's Golden Treasury. McFadden first came to prominence as a promoter of Ulster literature in the 1940s when he edited two anthologies of poetry, Ulster Voices and Irish Voices in 1943. In 1948, McFadden co-founded with Barbara Edwards (née Hunter) the Northern Irish poetry magazine Rann and, then, co-edited it with her during its whole run, until 1953. Like its predecessor Lagan, it was unapologetically regionalist.

He was the author of nine volumes of poetry, from Swords and Ploughshares (1943) to the posthumously published Last Poems (2002). Among his poems are "Saint Francis and the Birds" and "Independence". His book, The Garryowen, was published by Chatto and Windus in the Phoenix Living Poets series. Most recently, his poem "Post-War" has been anthologised in Armistice: A Laureate's Choice of Poems of War and Peace (Faber Poetry) (2018). There was a long gap between 1947 and 1971 when he published no collections of his work, however he continued to write and published in periodicals and newspapers such as The Irish Times where in that time he had sixty poems printed. His voice was well known on local BBC radio through the Poetry Notebooks series and he also had several verse-plays broadcast.

The Roy McFadden Papers, comprising the poet's personal manuscripts and papers, are lodged at Queen's University Belfast.

The Roy McFadden Library, at Trinity College Dublin, comprises books and journals on Irish and world literature from the poet's collection.

A comprehensive collection of Roy McFadden's published work is held at the South Bank Poetry Library, London.

== Personal life ==
He was born in Downpatrick on 14 November 1921 to Roland Victor MCFadden and his wife Maud Steele. A short time later the family relocated to Belfast. McFadden was educated at Knock Grammar School, Regent House, Newtownards, and later graduated in Law from Queen's University in 1944. He became a prominent lawyer and an influential figure in Belfast literary scene. In 1952 McFadden married Margaret Ferguson. They had three sons and two daughters. He lived for a number of years in Lisburn, County Antrim. Inspired by Herbert Read and Alex Comfort, he described himself as a pacifist and an anarchist in 1999. McFadden died at his Belfast home in 1999.
