= William Conor =

Belfast artist

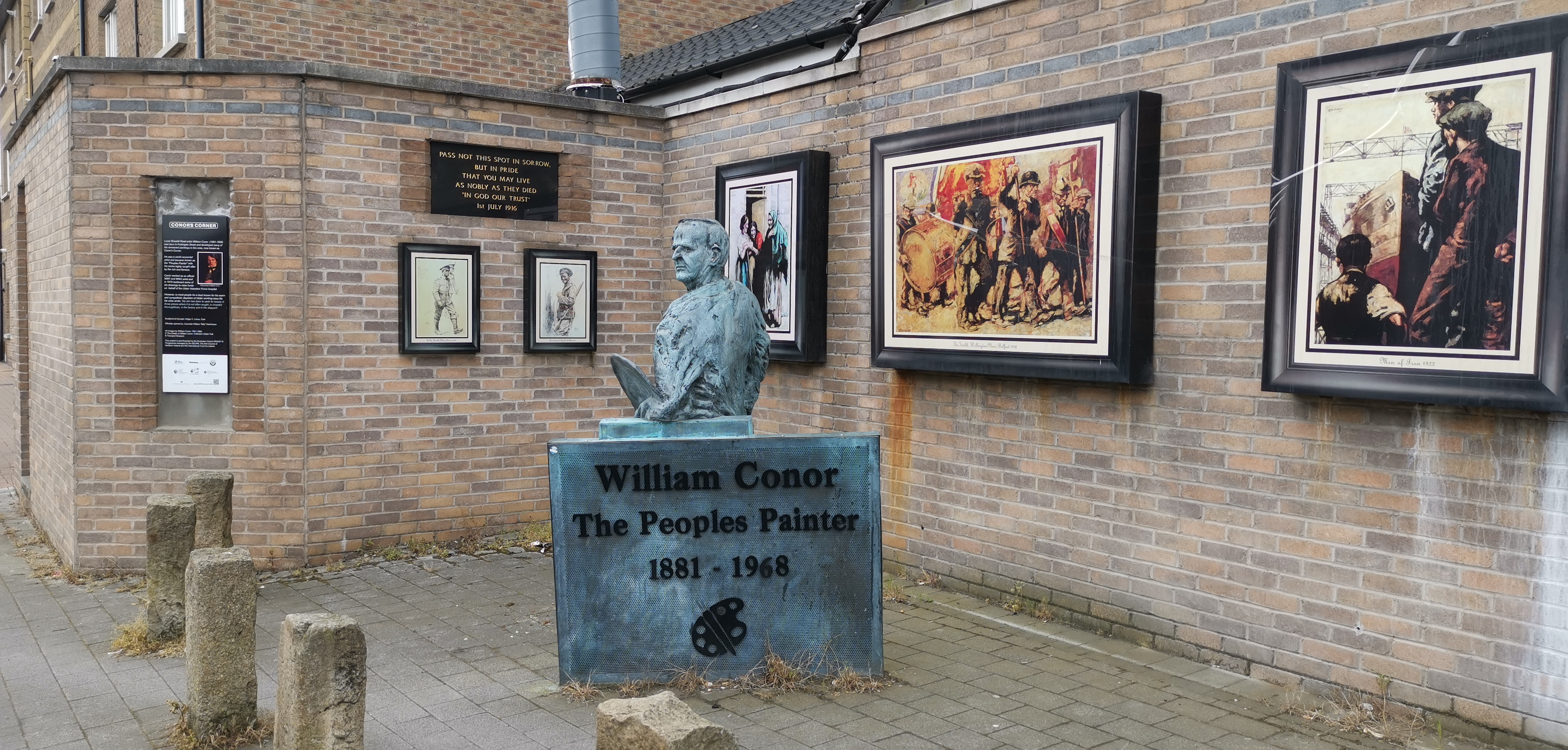
Statue of William Conor in Belfast

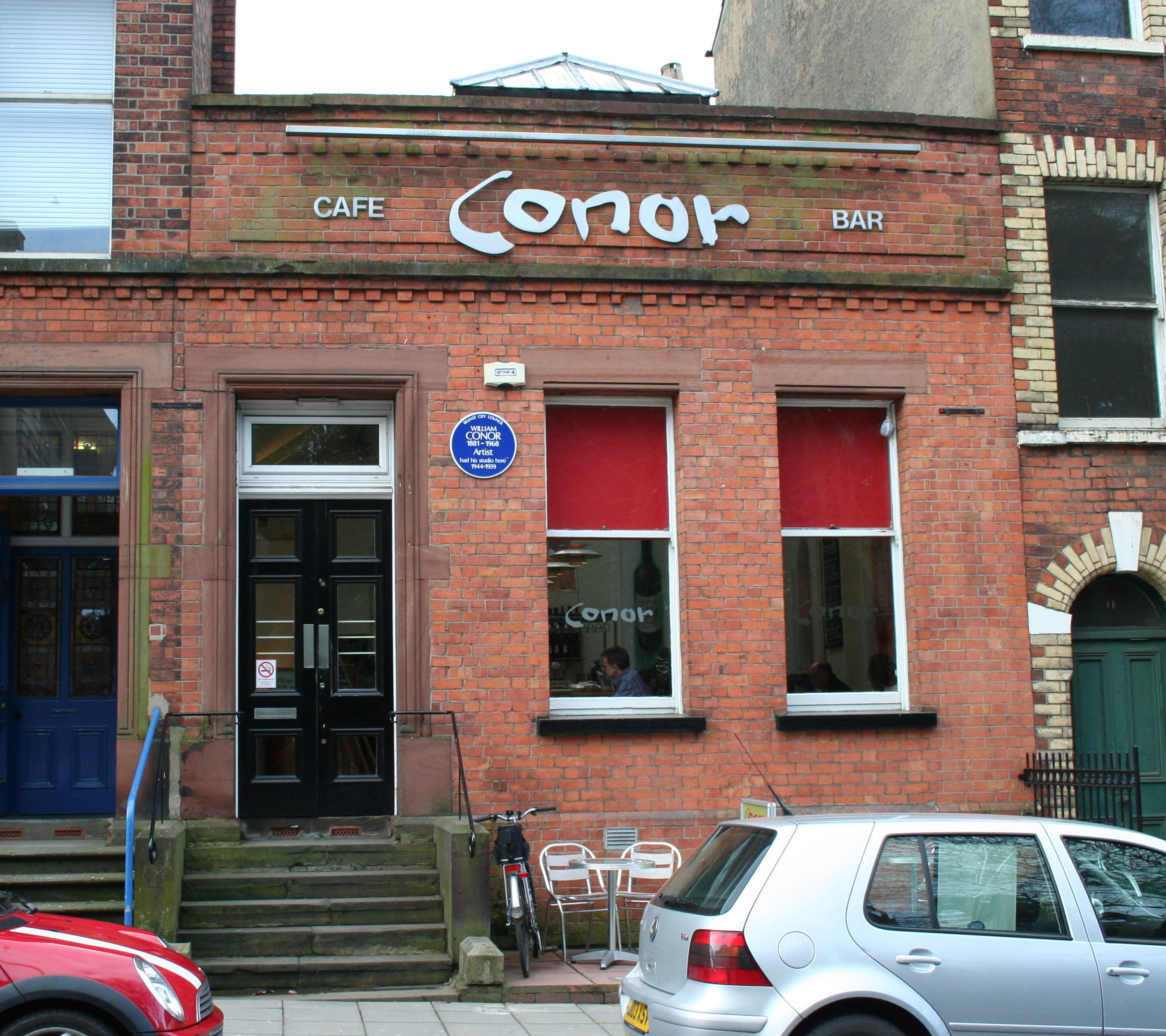
Cafe-bar at Stranmillis, Belfast in 2008, named for the artist who had his studio here. (The café-bar has since been renamed.)

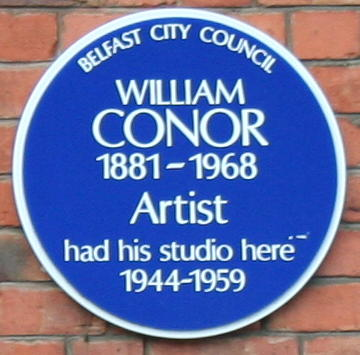
Plaque to the artist, Stranmillis

William Conor OBE RHA PPRUA ROI (1881–1968) was a Belfast-born artist.

Celebrated for his warm and sympathetic portrayals of working-class life in Ulster, William Conor studied at the Government School of Design in Belfast in the 1890s. Born in 5 Fortingale Street, which ran from Agnes Street, off the Shankill Road to the Old Lodge Road in north Belfast, the son of a wrought-iron worker, his artistic talents were recognized at the early age of ten when a teacher of music, Louis Mantell, noticed the merit of his chalk drawings and arranged for him to attend the College of Art.

On finishing his studies at the College of Art he became apprenticed to David Allen and Sons a firm of lithographers where he worked in the poster design department. Although he had become skilled in a trade, he did not want to spend his life working in a lithographic firm.

Conor left David Allen around 1910/1911 to pursue a career as an artist. According to the account of a family friend he then spent some months living on the Great Blasket Island, County Kerry. Also around this time there were sketching trips made to Ardara, County Donegal and Kinlough, County Leitrim. Sometime during 1912 /1913 Conor made his way to Paris, studying the Dutch and Italian masters and learning the craft of representational painting. However he found it difficult to survive financially in Paris and returned home after six months.

In 1913 he was elected to the Committee of the Belfast Art Society Council.

Following the outbreak of WWI in 1914 William Conor was commissioned by the British government to produce official pictorial records of soldiers and munitions workers.

He moved to London in 1920 and there met and socialised with such artists as Sir John Lavery and Augustus John. He exhibited at the RA in 1921 and in Dublin at the Royal Hibernian Academy (RHA) from 1918–1967, showing there nearly 200 works.

Conor was one of the first Academicians when the Belfast Art Society became the Ulster Academy of Arts in 1930. He became an Associate RHA in 1939 and a full member in 1947. Exhibitions at the Victor Waddington Galleries were held in 1944 and 1948. In 1952 he was appointed as an officer of the Order of the British Empire (OBE) and in 1957 he was elected President of the RUA - an office he held until 1964. More than 50 works of his in crayon and watercolour are in the permanent collections of the Ulster Museum.
