= Irish Exhibition of Living Art =

The Irish Exhibition of Living Art (IELA; Irish: Taispeántas na hÉireann ar an Ealaín Bheo) was a yearly exhibition of Irish abstract expressionism and avant-garde Irish art that was started in 1943 by Mainie Jellett.

== Background ==
=== World War II Ireland ===
During World War II, Ireland maintained a policy of neutrality, a period referred to domestically as "the Emergency." The Irish government, under Taoiseach Éamon de Valera, declined to align with either the Allied or Axis powers, which resulted in a degree of diplomatic and economic isolation from much of the Western world. Restrictions on travel further reinforced this isolation, as few Irish citizens traveled abroad, and foreign visitors to Ireland were limited.

Neutrality during the war prompted internal debates regarding Ireland's national identity and political drection. Critics of the government's stance expressed concerns over the country's detachment from global affairs, the government's perceived failure to uphold republican ideals, and widespread economic hardships. Ireland faced significant shortages of essential goods, including sugar, soap, tea, paraffin, tobacco, meat, flour, bread, and biscuits, leading to increased hardship for the population. Rising prices, supply difficulties, and fuel shortages contributed to these economic challenges.

The war years and their aftermath also influenced cultural and artistic discourse in Ireland. Irish artists and intellectuals engaged in discussions regarding the nature of "Irish art" and its role in shaping national identity in a rapidly changing world. These debates reflected broader societal concerns about Ireland’s place on the global stage and its ability to assert itself as an independent nation.

=== Art In Ireland ===
Art in Ireland during the 1930s and 1940s still primarily consisted of traditional representational art. Championed by the Royal Hibernian Academy and the National College of Art, this traditionalist art remained the favoured style of visual artistic creation following the Emergency period. Many Irish artists rejected the established institutions and sought philosophical inspiration from other fields, particularly that of literature. Although it was not until the late 1930s that the character of Irish art was to be seriously challenged as Irish artists began seeking an Irish artistic identity. With Mainie Jellett leading the way (and subsequently Norah McGuinness following Jellett's young death in 1944, soon after the first exhibition in 1943), the artists of Ireland found an outlet to challenge the traditionalist movements in Ireland through organisations like the IELA.

Prior to the opening of the IELA, one major exhibition took place each year in Dublin, which was the Annual Exhibition of the Royal Hibernian Academy. The RHA, and other major art institutions in Ireland at this time, supported art that accurately portrayed reality. And while the established art forums favoured traditional representational art, there was some push back from groups of artists in favour of modernist art. One of the most well-known of these prior to the IELA was known as the White Stag Group which was formed in the late 1930s. The White Stag Group, formed by Kenneth Hall and Basil Rakoczi, had middle-class English roots that spread to Dublin and the rest of Ireland. The organisations of the IELA and White Stag Group are cited as responsible for non-traditional Irish art being displayed in a way that was accessible and popular.

== History of the IELA ==
The IELA was formed in 1943 after a group of artists in Ireland sought to oppose the traditional hegemony created by the Royal Hibernian Academy (RHA) and the National College of Art in Ireland. Artists in this group included Norah McGuinness, Mainie Jellett, Evie Hone, Fr. Jack Hanlon, Hilary Heron and Louis le Brocquy, among others. While not all of them subscribed completely to the modernism of the rest of western Europe and the United States, these artists did seek to stray off the path established by Irish art institutions. Many artists that founded the IELA were influenced by the dissenting Impressionist art circles in Paris who broke away from the French Academy. Even though they understood this may cause friction with established institutions in Ireland, many of the founders saw the French as an example to be followed. However, many artists managed to form a delicate balance, seeing as artists who displayed their work in the IELA also displayed pieces through the other traditional institutions such as the RHA. Nonetheless, the IELA's main goal was to provide a forum for artists who sought to reshape the Irish artistic landscape and provided them the means through which to do that.

The beginnings of the IELA can be traced to an open criticism of the RHA by Jellett which ultimately led to other modernist artists like le Brocquy having their works rejected for exhibitions hosted annually by the RHA. In response to this, Jellett and other modernist artists established the IELA to create a forum to display the work of artists regardless of what school or style they subscribed to. Reviews of the IELA's first show in 1943 indicated the division in the art world over artistic identity and creativity. In some instances, this division was deeply entrenched, especially in the National College of Art, which was opposed to modernist movements for some time. However, this opposition was not felt as strongly in every established institution in the country. Even though steadfastness for traditional art was common, much of the art world in Ireland remained fairly well connected and eased their opposition to the tide of modernism coming from continent-inspired artists. Both the modernist and traditionalist camps had their work displayed by the same institutions in some instances. Ultimately, this coexistence allowed for institutions like IELA to be friendly with organisations such as the RHA, without which the IELA would have no traction in the Dublin art world.

Female artists played a critical role in the formation and establishment of the IELA. The first two presidents of the Exhibition, Mainie Jellett and Norah McGuinness, were women who held the position during the formative years of the Exhibition. Jellett, who served as the president before her death in 1944, played a key role in its formation, and McGuinness, who served for over 20 years after its foundation, played a critical role in maintaining the direction that the IELA stood for. In 1972, the original management stepped down and handed off the Exhibition to a younger generation of artists.

The IELA remains a showcase for contemporary art and has since expanded to include other art forms such as performance, video, and installation art.
