= Arts Council of Northern Ireland =

Arts Council of Northern Ireland logo

The Arts Council of Northern Ireland (Irish: Comhairle Ealaíon Thuaisceart Éireann, Ulster-Scots: Airts Cooncil o Norlin Airlan) is the lead development agency for the arts in Northern Ireland. It was founded in 1964, as a successor to the Committee for the Encouragement of Music and the Arts (CEMA).

As the main development agency for the arts it is responsible for the distribution of Exchequer and National Lottery Funding for the arts in Northern Ireland. Organisationally it is a non-departmental public body of the Department for Communities and maintains an organisational base at Metropolitan Arts Centre, Belfast.

== See also ==
- List of Government departments and agencies in Northern Ireland
- Northern Ireland Screen
- Arts Council (Ireland), with which it works closely
