= Belfast School of Art =

Art school at Ulster University

Belfast School of Art (Ulster University School of Art)
- Established: 1849; 177 years ago
- Focus: Art, Research, Design
- Head of School: Brian Dixon
- Faculty: Faculty of Art, Design and the Built Environment
- Owner: Ulster University
- Location: Belfast, Northern Ireland, United Kingdom
- Coordinates: 54.60383341944372°N 5.9288864017592°W
- Interactive map of Belfast School of Art (Ulster University School of Art)
- Website: www.ulster.ac.uk/faculties/arts-humanities-and-social-sciences/art

The Belfast School of Art, formerly the Belfast Government School of Art, is a School in the Ulster University Faculty of Arts, Humanities and Social Sciences and is physically located at the Belfast campus. Following the results of the Research Excellence Framework 2014 Ulster is ranked within the top ten for research in Art and Design in the UK.

The School hosts an exhibition of graduating students work annually at the beginning of June each year. This exhibition is open to the public and free entry.

== History ==
The Government School of Art was originally established as part of the Royal Belfast Academical Institution, from 1849 to 1855. Established by 1849 as the Normal School of Design, it was housed in two rooms of the Belfast Academical Institution. This closed in 1855 due to a lack of funding and apathy. It reopened 15 years later in 1870 under the title of the Government School of Art and operated under that name for 30 years. A merger with Belfast College of Technology in 1900 brought another name change to the Belfast Municipal School of Art and relocation in 1901 to the top floor of the Merchants Buildings on North Street, before relocating again to the newly built Belfast Municipal Technical Institute in 1907. When the Institute changed its name to the Municipal College of Technology in 1930 the school of art became known as the College of Art. It remained on their premises until 1970 when it moved to a new facility on York Street. The adjacent student union building named the Conor Hall, functioned as a music venue from the late 1980s. Bands that played there included The Wedding Present, The Orb, Therapy?, Sonic Youth Rocket From The Crypt and Patti Smith. The venue also hosted club nights including Sugar Sweet with local DJs David Holmes and Iain McCready.

The Conor Hall was demolished in 2004 at the beginning of a wider multi-million pound refurbishment and redevelopment of the Belfast campus which saw the School's floorspace expanded and significant investment. The schools now resides in a purpose built complex of studios, workshops and social spaces. It benefits from views of the Cathedral Quarter, the Titanic Quarter and the £250 million new Ulster University Greater Belfast City Campus development.

== Academics ==
The Belfast School of Art is the largest Art and Design facility on the island with a wide range of disciplines and staff who are active in their creative and professional careers and closely networked in Ireland, the UK and internationally. As the main Art and Design provider for nearly 170 years, many leading artists and Designers have passed through its doors including John Luke, TP Flanagan and, more recently 2 Turner prize winners. The School has a number of Undergraduate degrees, Masters programmes and Doctoral provision.

Programmes include:

- BDes (Hons) Animation
- BA (Hons) Art & Design (Foundation Year for specialist degrees)
- BDes (Hons) Games Design
- BDes (Hons) Graphic Design and Illustration
- BDes (Hons) Interaction Design
- BA (Hons) Fine Art
- BA (Hons) Photography with Video
- BA (Hons) Product Design
- BA (Hons) Textile Art, Design and Fashion
- MA Animation
- MSc Art Psychotherapy
- MSc Fashion & Textile Retail Management
- MFA Fine Art
- MA Games Design
- MFA Photography
- MFA Photography [online]
- MA UX and Service Design

The School is regular host to international artists and visiting scholars; it offers the opportunity for excelling students to study abroad and welcomes students from other places for courses, exchanges and summer schools.

Unique, a Students' Union led initiative, opened a shop on campus in September 2017 to allow the public to view and purchase work made by students, staff and alumni. The custom made shop interior was also designed by students and it staffed by placement students. There is also a gallery on campus and the School's staff play an active role in civic and cultural life in Belfast and beyond.

Around 50 Phd researchers investigate subjects relevant to art, design and the creative industries in a recently refurbished Doctoral student Hub. The School has over 3 decades experience in successful supervision of PhD with art practice. The School has had 37 successful doctoral students between 2008 and 2013, together these students amassed £4.25 million in research fundraising. The Doctoral College supports all doctoral students in the Faculty and School.

== Research ==
The Research Institute for Art and Design, RIAD, was established in 2004 at Ulster University. It supports research in a wide range of Art and Design disciplines. Recent research grants have includes societally relevant research into design for health and creative industries. Art works by staff and alumni are in leading museums and collections around the globe.

=== Research ranking ===
==== 2014 ====
In the Research Excellence Framework (REF) 2014 for Art, Ulster University, was ranked third overall in the UK for 4* research and sixth in the UK in the quality index.

== Governance ==
The School is led by Head of School Dr Brian Dixon, who reports to the Executive Dean of the Faculty of Arts Humanities and Social Sciences in Ulster University. The Head of School works closely with the Research Director for Art and Design Prof Justin Magee and with the School Officer, supported by a team of Course Directors. The School makes effective use of industry and real world advisory groups and networks to ensure that programmes and staff are relevant. Students are encouraged to undertake placement experience.

Heads of School have included:

- Dr Brian Dixon (July 2022 - ongoing)
- Louise O'Boyle (2019 - 2022)
- Professor Karen Fleming (2017 - 2019)
- Professor Paul Seawright (2013 - 2017)
- Professor Barbara Dass
- Professor Ian Montgomery

Associate Heads of School have included:

- Dr Cherie Driver (April 2021 - ongoing)
- Louise O'Boyle (4 July 2018 - October 2019)
- Rachel Dickson (1 June 2014 - 1 June 2018)
- Deborah Fraser

Research Directors have included:

- Dr Justin Magee (2017 - ongoing)
- Professor Karen Fleming (2008 - 2017)

== Notable alumni ==
"Government School of Art"

- Jessie O. Douglas
- William Robert Gordon.
- The Morrow brothers
  - Albert Morrow
  - George Morrow
- Georgina Moutray Kyle
- Rosamond Praeger
- James Ward
