= Cumann na nGaedheal =

Defunct Irish political party

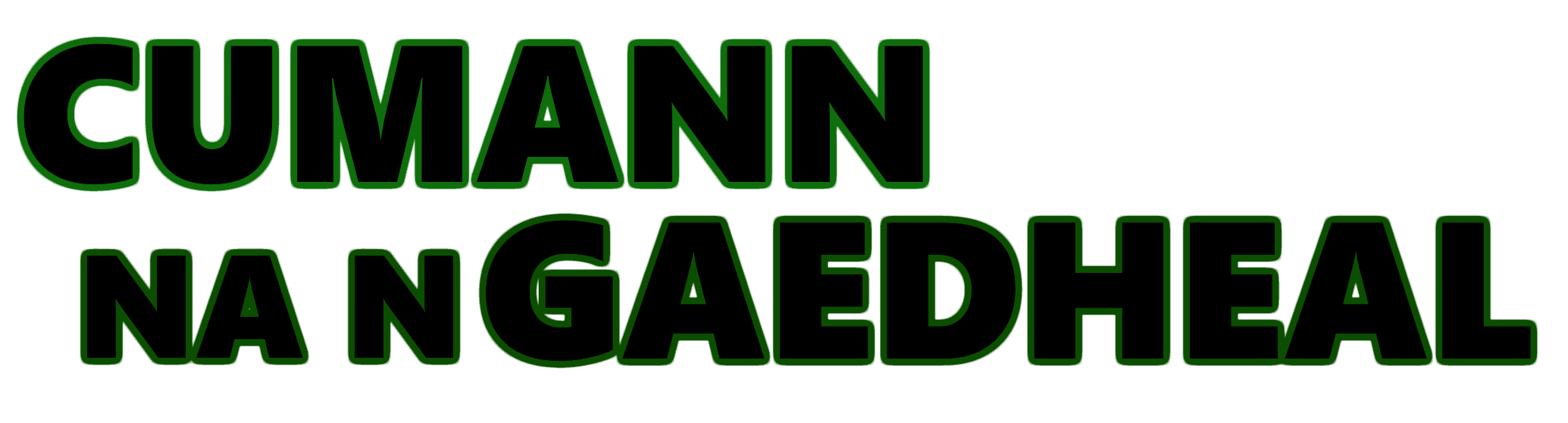
- Leader: W. T. Cosgrave
- Founded: 27 April 1923
- Dissolved: 8 September 1933
- Split from: Sinn Féin
- Merged into: Fine Gael
- Ideology: Christian democracy; Conservatism; Irish nationalism; Pro-Treaty; Anti-communism
- Political position: Centre-right

Cumann na nGaedheal (Irish pronunciation: [ˈkʊmˠən̪ˠ n̪ˠə ˈŋeːl̪ˠ]; lit. 'Society of the Gaels') was a political party in the Irish Free State which formed the government from 1923 to 1932. It was named after the original Cumann na nGaedheal organisation, which merged with the Dungannon Clubs and the National Council to form Sinn Féin in 1905. In 1933 it merged with smaller groups to form the Fine Gael party.

== Origins ==
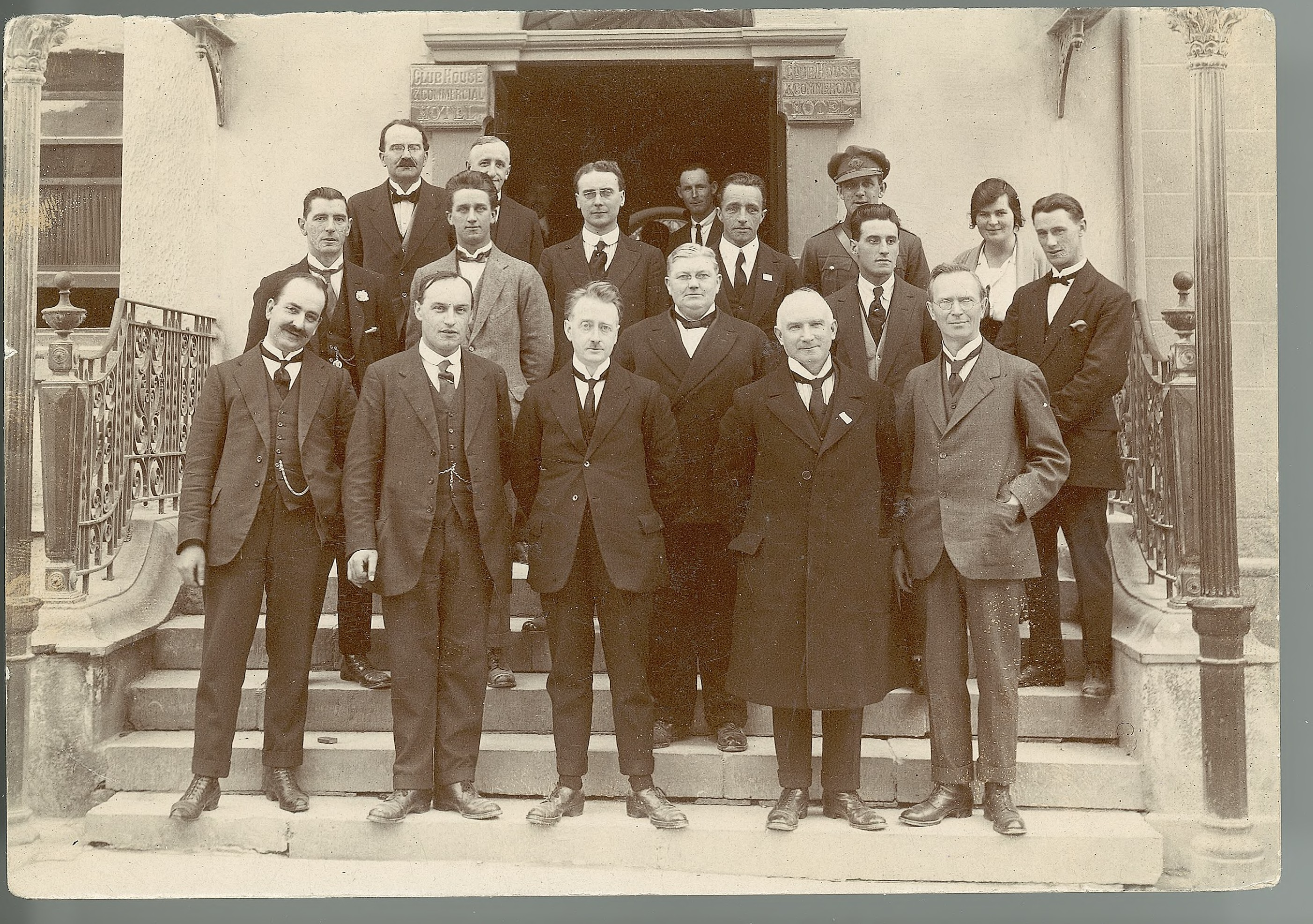
Cumann na nGaedheal Government, 1922/1923

In 1922, the pro-Treaty Government of the Irish Free State lost the support of Sinn Féin, its political party. The need to create a party supporting the government was not immediate. Cumann na nGaedheal was the name of the antecedent nationalist umbrella organisation to Sinn Féin formed in 1900 (see Cumann na nGaedheal (1900)). The second Cumann na nGaedheal did not come into existence until more than a year later, on 27 April 1923, when the pro-Treaty TDs recognised the need for a party organisation to win elections. Initially, the party's ability to influence the government was limited.

The party was largely centre-right in outlook. The pro-Treaty wing of Sinn Féin had decided to break off and become a distinct party in late December 1922, but its launch was delayed until after the New Year as a direct consequence of the turmoil caused by the Irish Civil War.

The leadership of the pro-Treaty Sinn Féin in 1922 included Arthur Griffith, Michael Collins and W. T. Cosgrave. Cosgrave and Griffith had been prominent in Sinn Féin since the 1900s, while Collins rose quickly through its ranks after the 1916 Easter Rising. Griffith and Collins died in August 1922 during the early stages of the Civil War, leaving Cosgrave to lead the pro-Treaty Provisional Government in the run-up to the formal establishment of the Irish Free State. Cosgrave had also fought in the Easter Rising and had been prominent in the Government of the Irish Republic; the burden of responsibility for building the new state on solid foundations was now on Cosgrave and his colleagues. Difficult years of state-building amidst political violence characterised its time in government.

The Irish Unionist Alliance was dissolved in 1922, when many of its followers swung their support behind Cumann na nGaedheal, seeing it as less hostile to them than the anti-Treaty Republicans and the later Fianna Fáil. When the first Seanad was formed, half of the seats were filled by unionists nominated by the Cumann na nGaedheal government. Prominent Southern Unionist politicians, like Maurice Dockrell, Richard Beamish and Bryan Cooper, supported the party.

== State building and reconstruction ==
The first election the party contested was the general election of 1923, when it won 63 seats (out of 153), with 39% of the votes cast. Until 1932, Cumann na nGaedheal continued to form the Government of the Irish Free State, with Cosgrave as President of the Executive Council.

In government, the party established the institutions upon which the current Irish state is still built. It also re-established law and order through a number of public safety acts in a country that had long been divided by war and competing ideologies. The party's Minister for Home Affairs, Kevin O'Higgins, established the Garda Síochána, an unarmed police force. As Minister for External Affairs in 1927, he was successful in increasing the Free State's autonomy within the British Commonwealth of Nations.

Cumann na nGaedheal as a government party was characterized by conservatism. Thus, when J.J. Walsh, Minister for Posts and Telegraphs, resigned in 1927 due to the government's lack of support for protectionism, he sent an open letter to Cosgrave, claiming, inter alia, that the party had gone ″over to the most reactionary elements of the state″.

== Consolidation and competition ==
In the general election in June 1927, Cumann na nGaedheal performed very poorly, winning just 47 seats with 27% of the vote, and was able to survive in office only because of Fianna Fáil's continued refusal to take up its 44 seats due to the party's rejection of the Oath of Allegiance to the Free State.

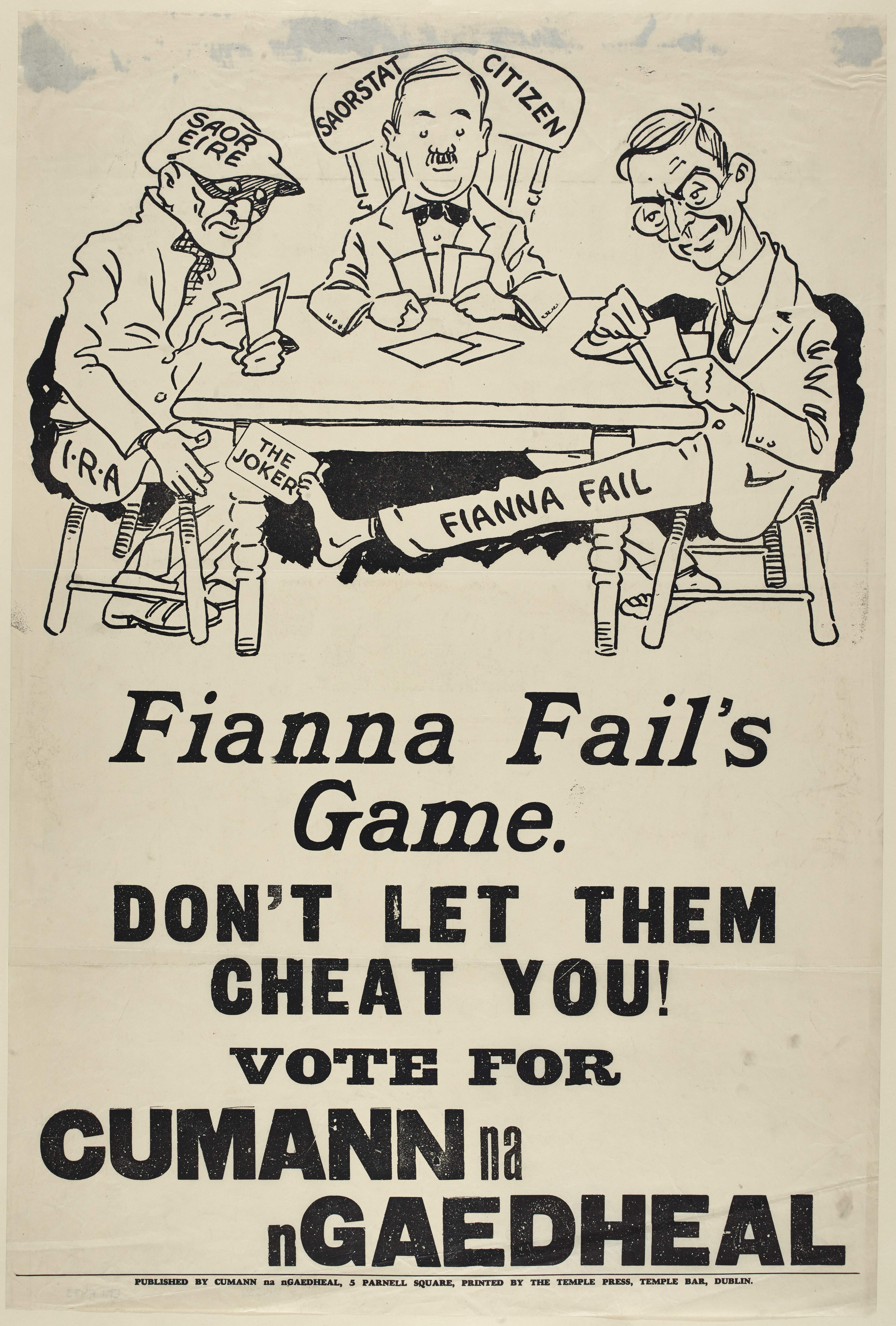
1932 poster attacking Saor Éire, a left wing group; Éamon de Valera passes a Joker to the IRA.

The assassination of Kevin O'Higgins, the controversial Minister for Justice, by Republicans shortly after the election came as a bitter blow to the party. In response to this act of violence, the state introduced a second Public Safety Act, which introduced the death penalty and was widely unpopular with the public, and an Electoral Amendment Act which forced elected TDs to take the Oath of Allegiance. Thus the murder indirectly led to Fianna Fáil's forced entry to the Dáil, and in August 1927 the government narrowly survived a vote of no confidence. Following victory in two by-elections, Cosgrave called a snap election in September 1927. Cumann na nGaedheal regained most of the ground lost in June, winning 62 seats and 39% of the vote, although most of these gains were from potential allies.

For the first time, the party now faced vigorous parliamentary (if not entirely constitutional) opposition in the Dáil, as Fianna Fáil also made significant gains. Since the foundation of the state, Dáil business had been relatively calm as the relatively small Labour Party functioned as the official opposition in the absence of die-hard Republicans. The scene was now set for a volatile atmosphere in parliament as the two sides who had fought each other in the civil war now met face to face.

== Electoral decline and merger ==
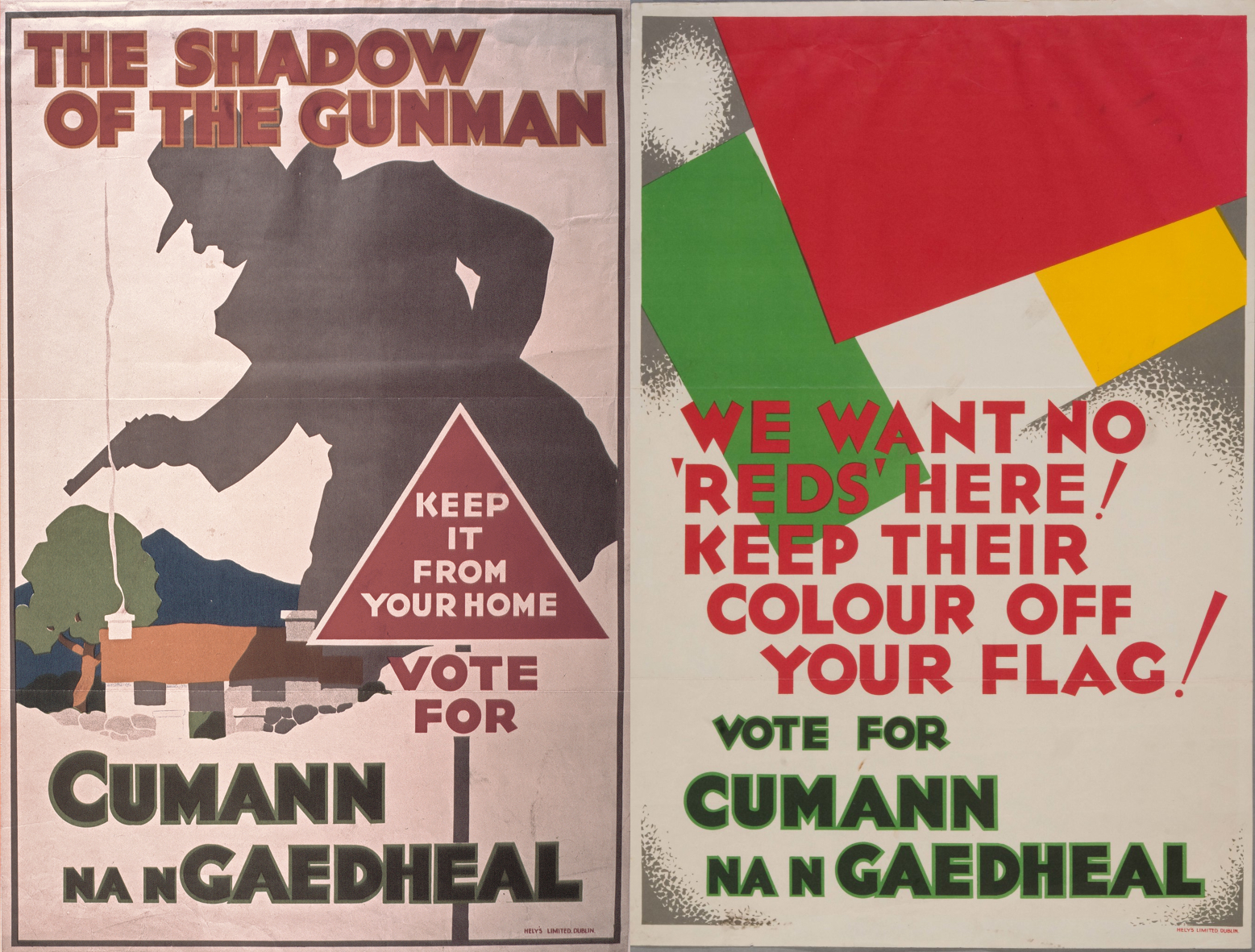
During the 1932 election Cumann na nGaedheal propaganda linked Fianna Fáil to the IRA, and the IRA to Communism.

The party's support base gradually slipped to Éamon de Valera's new party Fianna Fáil after its inception in 1926. Cosgrave's Cumann na nGaedheal became solely identified with protecting the treaty and defending the new State while it seemed preoccupied with public safety. Economically, the party favoured balanced budgets and free trade at a time when its opponents advocated protectionism. The weak economy of the Free State suffered during the Great Depression. Nonetheless, it came as a surprise when Cumann na nGaedheal was defeated by Fianna Fáil in the general election of February 1932, winning 57 seats to Fianna Fáil's 72.

Having spent its entire existence prior to 1932 in government, Cumann na nGaedheal was ill-prepared for a role in opposition. Its support base contracted further at the general election in January 1933, when it won 48 seats compared to Fianna Fáil's 77. Increasingly, the party found itself unable to counter de Valera's populism and was increasingly labelled the party of the middle class. The party subsequently entered discussions with the National Centre Party and the ultranationalist National Guard (Blueshirts) on the possibility of a merger. That came about in September 1933, with the formation of Fine Gael from the three parties, though, in reality, Fine Gael was a larger version of Cumann na nGaedheal. It was in the lead-up to the merger that the then Editor of the Irish Times, R.M. Smyllie, described Cumann na nGaedheal as a party "who one wished would be open to ideas, until one saw the kind of ideas they were open to".

== Election results ==
=== Dáil Éireann ===
Election	Leader	FPv	%	Seats	%	±	Dáil	Government
1923	W. T. Cosgrave	410,695	39.0 (#1)	63 / 153	41.2 (#1)	▲5	4th	Government; 2nd executive (CnG minority)
June 1927	W. T. Cosgrave	314,703	27.4 (#1)	47 / 153	30.7 (#1)	▼16	5th	Government; 3rd executive (CnG minority)
Sep. 1927	W. T. Cosgrave	453,028	38.7 (#1)	62 / 153	40.5 (#1)	▲15	6th	Government; 4th, 5th executive (CnG-FP minority)
1932	W. T. Cosgrave	449,506	35.3 (#2)	57 / 153	37.3 (#2)	▼5	7th	Opposition; 6th executive (FF minority)
1933	W. T. Cosgrave	422,495	30.5 (#2)	48 / 153	31.4 (#2)	▼9	8th	Opposition; 7th executive (FF minority)

=== Seanad Éireann ===
Election	Seats won	±	Position	First Pref votes	%
1925	14 / 60	▲1	1st	126,218	41.3%

== See also ==
- Category:Cumann na nGaedheal politicians
