= William Robert Gordon =

Northern Irish landscape and portrait painter (1872–1955)

William Robert Gordon HRUA
- Born: 18 August 1872; Moira, County Down
- Died: 25 February 1955 (aged 82); Finaghy, Belfast
- Education: Laird School of Art; Belfast School of Design
- Known for: Portraits and landscapes

William Robert Gordon HRUA (18 August 1872 – 25 February 1955) was an influential Northern Irish landscape and portrait painter, and an educator. He was a founding member of the Ulster Arts Club and the Ulster Literary Theatre.

== Early life ==
William Gordon was born in Moira, County Down in 1872. Gordon attended the Bluecoat School in Downpatrick before travelling at the age of fourteen to England in search of work. He came under the employ of Port Sunlight Soap and studied at the Laird School of Art, Birkenhead in his spare time. In 1898 Gordon distinguished himself in a national design competition. Whilst awaiting the results from his teaching examinations, Gordon returned to Belfast where he worked as a labourer in the shipyards. Gordon qualified as an art teacher with no less than eight first class certificates.

Gordon continued his studies under George Trobridge at Belfast School of Design from 1897 to 1900, where he was a contemporary of Paul Henry, Seamus Stoupe, and the Morrow brothers, Norman and Edwin. Gordon was appointed pupil teacher at the School in 1897 where he was to receive a free scholarship the following year. Gordon won the Lord Mayor's prize for his sketches of objects at the Free Public Library and Museum in 1899.

He became a textile designer for a period, later turning his attention to landscape painting. In 1901 Gordon was appointed art master at Royal Belfast Academical Institute, a position he was to hold for forty-five years until his retirement in 1946. For many years Gordon also delivered night classes at Newtownards Technical School. He was for a time Chairman of the Art Teachers Association. Gordon sat on the Belfast Corporation's Libraries, Museums and Art Committee for thirty-five years and advocated for Sunday opening of museums and galleries.

== Career ==
Gordon showed a portrait bust at the Nineteenth Annual Exhibition of the Belfast Art Society in 1899 and another in the following year. In 1902 Gordon became a founding member of the Ulster Arts Club and accepted the position of joint Honorary Secretary. He was later elected as President in January 1914. In 1903 Gordon showed damask designs at the Ulster Arts Club's inaugural exhibition with George Trobridge, F W Hull, John Lavery, and five of the Morrow brothers amongst many others. On 22 August 1906 Gordon married Elizabeth Darragh of Cullybackey, in New York.

Gordon contributed six friezes of Ulster landscapes for the Ulster Pavilion at the British Empire Exhibition in Wembley in 1925. In 1927 his work was included in a loan exhibition of Irish Portraits by Ulster Artists which was held at the Belfast Free Library on Royal Avenue. Gordon was the designer of the official standard of the Governor of Northern Ireland. Gordon supplemented his income by painting banners for Orange and Hibernian lodges. Gordon was one of a select committee appointed to draft a constitution for the newly formed Ulster Academy of Arts in 1928.

The Gallery at 7 St Stephen's Green in Dublin was the venue for a joint exhibition of landscapes of the Glens of Antrim with fellow Ulsterman John Hunter in 1932. The Haverty Trust commissioned Gordon and Hunter to create a Bronze Age mural in the Natural History section of the Belfast Museum and Art Gallery which was unveiled by Thomas Bodkin in June 1934. In December of the same year Gordon contributed several works to the only exhibition by the Ulster Unit, a modernist group who were inspired by Paul Nash's Unit One. A Gordon watercolour Downpatrick was amongst the work of many artists, writers and musicians included in the Ulster Society for the Prevention of Cruelty to Animals centennial publication The Tree in 1936.

In the autumn of 1947 Gordon held a joint exhibition of works with the sculptor Morris Harding at the Belfast Museum and Art Gallery. Gordon's work included in excess of thirty watercolours and fifteen oils of which John Hewitt commented "The paintings, seldom as good as one expected from the intelligence and experience of the man...". After a lifetime association with the Royal Ulster Academy and her predecessors, Gordon was elected an Honorary Academician in 1949. In 1950 Gordon was the curator of a CEMA sponsored exhibition showing lithographs by Daumier and Gavarni.

Following his discharge from a lengthy stay at Belfast's City Hospital, the Council For the Encouragement of Music and the Arts hosted a solo exhibition of Gordon's work at their Donegall Place gallery in 1952. The exhibition comprised forty works equally split between oils and water colours of landscapes and still life, and was Gordon's first show in a number of years. He held his final solo show at the same venue in 1954.

He was an original member of the Ulster Literary Theatre alongside Jack Morrow and John Campbell. He was a seasoned viola player and ballad singer, and a baritone opera singer. He made numerous recordings which were released on Decca Records. His theatrical endeavours included stage and costume design, in addition to acting and producing plays. He was also a radio actor and a frequent performer on BBC radio throughout the 1930s.

== Death and legacy ==
W R Gordon died at his home in Finaghy, south Belfast on 25 February 1955. He was eighty-two years of age. Gordon was survived by his wife and one daughter. The Ulster Museum presented a small retrospective of Gordon's work in 1972 consisting of watercolours provided by his daughter, and a variety of lithographic portraits completed in the 1920s.

His friend, the art critic Ray Rosenfield offered a eulogy on Gordon's work in 1972 when he wrote,

"As an artist, I think, he was never given the recognition he deserved; he was too painstaking a craftsman to appeal at a time when the art world was turning away from realism. Now that the virtues of academic training are beginning to be appreciated again Gordon's mastery of colour and line, the clarity of his composition should once more be recognised."

His works can be found in many private and public collections including the Arts Council of Northern Ireland, the Ulster Museum, the Ulster Arts Club, and the Armagh County Museum.
