= Jack Morrow =

Irish political cartoonist, illustrator, and painter (1872–1926)

- Born: John Cassell Morrow; 26 February 1872; Belfast, Ireland
- Died: 11 January 1926 (aged 53); Dublin, Ireland
- Known for: Political cartooning, landscape painting

John Cassell (Jack) Morrow (26 February 1872 – 11 January 1926) was a political cartoonist, illustrator and landscape painter.

John Cassell Morrow was born in Belfast in 1872. He was the son of George Morrow, a painter and decorator from Hanover House, Clifton Street, in west Belfast. All but one of his seven brothers were working artists. Morrow married Huberta Marie Josephine Gilhuijs and they had two sons, Donal and Dermot, and two daughters, Nora, nicknamed Moppie, and Huberta.

== Life and work ==
Jack Morrow was the most politically active amongst his siblings and was a regular contributor to The Irish Review, The Republic, and other Irish journals. Along with his brothers Harry, Edwin and Fred, he was instrumental to the success of Bulmer Hobson's Ulster Literary Theatre in its early years. Writing on the rehearsal of a play entitled The Enthusiast which he had watched in 1905, Sam Hanna Bell concludes that Morrow's acting as lead character, James McKinstry, was "the one weak spot in the piece."

Morrow sent "a finely executed" bronze celtic shield to the Louisiana Purchase Exposition in St. Louis which was displayed at the public library on Royal Avenue in Belfast in April of that year, and bore the motto in Gaelic, "The Shield of Heroes: the Gift of the High King". The Arts and Crafts Society of Ireland showed two of Morrow's works in Dublin in 1904, a repoussé copper shield and an eight-day clock in repoussé silver, and he also contributed some copper fittings for two pieces of furniture produced by the Irish Decorative Art Association of Belfast to the same show. Morrow showed An April Morning at Aonach na Nodlag in the Rotunda in 1909 alongside Wiliam Leech, William Orpen, George Russell and a host of well known Irish Artists. In the following year along with his brother Edwin, he donated several paintings to the Belfast Aonach organised by the Ladies' Committee of the Dail.

His cartoons, amongst others, shown through a magic lantern, were an early attraction at Bulmer Hobson's Dungannon Clubs in 1905. Cartoons were an integral part of The Republic magazine, and Morrow's cartoon Catching Recruits became one of their best known anti-enlistment graphics after its publication in December 1906, and associated postcard sales from the same issue. His only other work known to have been published as a postcard, was The Secret of England's Greatness, which appeared in the 17 January 1907 issue of the magazine. Morrow designed the cover for the Gaelic League's yearbook Féilire na Gaeilge 1908 with Sean Mac Murchadha. Morrow presented four works to the Gaelic League's 1906 Oireachtas exhibition and a further six, all landscapes, to the 1911 show.

In 1908 Morrow and his brothers held an exhibition at the family business of 15 D'Olier Street in Dublin which consisted of seventy-three works, including several watercolours by Jack. Snoddy speculates that this was at the launch of the business. Morrow was a member of the Five Provinces Branch of the Gaelic League in 1911, when he showed work at an exhibition at No.7 St. Stephen's Green. By 1912 Jack Morrow had become a member of the Wolfe Tone and United Irishmen Memorial Association Committee which was a radical organisation and a legal front for the Irish Republican Brotherhood. In the autumn of 1912 Morrow joined fifteen artists from the Cuig Cuigi branch of the Gaelic League in an exhibition comprising 78 works at the Rotunda in Parnell Square, with Morrow displaying three pictures, Harvest, September Sunshine and Between Showers. In 1912 and 1916 Morrow showed at the Royal Hibernian Academy annual exhibitions.

Morrow collaborated with Joseph Plunkett and Thomas MacDonagh's Irish Theatre Company in the opening season in April 1915, to produce the set for Eimar O'Duffy's The Walls of Athens, which had been published previously in The Irish Review.

Morrow returned to political cartooning in 1917, but on 6 September 1918 he was arrested in possession of seditious postcards and secret Government documents at his home in D'Olier Street. Morrow's health declined, and after a week of imprisonment without charge, he was transferred to the Mater Hospital for treatment where he remained for some seven weeks. Morrow was released without charge in December and re-arrested a month later. Morrow was court martialled on 28 January 1919 when he refused to recognise the jurisdiction of the Court and entered no plea. In February he was sentenced to seven months in Mountjoy Prison with hard labour, under the Defence of the Realm Act, for unauthorised possession of confidential government documents.

Morrow was associated with The Craftworkers Ltd., a Dublin co-operative engaged in church decoration, and he and Albert G Power designed the mosaic panels and the renovation of the altar and chancel walls at St. Catherine's Church on Meath Street. For a time he taught design at the Dublin Metropolitan School of Art.

== Death and legacy ==
Jack Morrow died in Dublin on 11 January 1926. On 9 February 1926 his widow remarried.

Examples of his work can be found at the National Gallery of Ireland.
