= Jessie O. Douglas =

British artist and educator (1856-?)

Jessie Ogston Douglas (1856 - ?) a British water colour artist, educator, and former vice-president of the Belfast Art Society where she was also elected an honorary member. Douglas also exhibited work at the Paris Salon.

== Early life and education ==
Douglas was born in Belfast, one of two daughters of Jessie and Alexander Douglas. Little is known of Douglas's family or early life. It is known that she attended the Belfast Government School of Art between 1872 and 1882, where she was a contemporary of Albert Morrow. In a review of the annual Ladies Sketching Club exhibition of 1882 the writer in the Belfast Newsletter comments:

"Miss Jessie Douglas whose works occupy the greater part of an entire desk, is one of the most talented and painstaking of all the pupils. Her progress has not been over-rapid but we certainly think that some of her sketches on view are a distinct improvement upon any that she has previously shown. The flower and foliage studies are absolutely faultless in technique. The colouring is rich and the grouping natural. The treatment of the bramble by the same young lady shows much refinement and delicacy. The landscapes are also clever and the figure study capital. Miss Douglas's works are not only a credit to herself but also the school."

Douglas then spent some time studying at the Parisian ateliers of Tony Robert-Fleury, Jules Joseph Lefebvre, Gustave Courtois, Joseph Blanc and Charles Lasar amongst others. She showed at the Parisian Black and White Show, and in 1888 she displayed one work, Brutalité, at the Paris Salon. The names of exhibited works reveal her extensive travels across Europe, to Venice, Brittany, Flanders and Zeeland.

== Career ==
Upon her return to Belfast in 1890 Douglas showed two works with the Water Colour Society of Ireland alongside Sarah Purser, and fellow debutante George Trobridge, Head of the Belfast School of Art. Douglas would exhibit regularly with the Society for the next thirty years, in which time she displayed more than seventy works. By 1891 Douglas had established a studio at 6 Chichester Street, Belfast where she offered tuition with a Miss L Dickson. In the same year Douglas's work was shown at the fifteenth annual exhibition at Rodman & Company, on Royal Avenue, Belfast. In September 1894 Douglas relocated her studio to 1 Donegall Square West. Two years thereafter, in September 1896, Douglas had moved her business once again, to a studio at 24 Garfield Chambers, Royal Avenue where she was to work for more than thirty years. Here she was to offer private tuition for students who included Kathleen Isabella Mackie and Jane Service Workman.

She had been exhibiting with the Belfast Art Society for several years when in 1896 she was elected one of four vice-presidents of the Society. Douglas was re-elected as vice-president at the Society's annual meeting in 1901. Douglas displayed five figurative works with the Irish Decorative Art Association at Portrush in the summer of 1902. She was to show with the Association for several years.

Douglas showed a watercolour at the Royal Academy Summer Exhibition of 1903, where she was to return just once more, with a second watercolour in 1908. She was one of six Irish artists that included Joseph W Carey and Percy French, who were represented at the Modern Gallery on Bond Street, London in 1904. Douglas displayed five works alongside Paul Henry, Vanessa and Clive Bell at the inaugural exhibition of the Allied Artists' Association at the Royal Albert Hall in 1908. She showed thrice more with the group from 1909 until her final presentation of three water colours in 1911. Her Mother died in January 1914, and her sister Mary in August 1925 at the age of 77.

Douglas showed regularly at other group shows including the Royal Scottish Academy, the Society of Women Artists, the Royal Society of Painters in Water Colour, and at the Walker Art Gallery and on three occasions at Connell & Sons Gallery. She also presented eight works at the Royal Hibernian Academy from 1906-20. Douglas and Rosamond Praeger were both elected as honorary members of the Belfast Art Society in 1918, where the former was to show her last picture in 1920. After 1928 her name no longer appears in their records, although her studio was still registered at Garfield Chambers in the 1932 Belfast Street Directory. Douglas was unmarried and remained in the family home at 1 Windsor Park Terrace for the majority of her life. It is not known when she died.
