= Georgina Moutray Kyle =

Irish artist (1865–1950)

Georgina Moutray Kyle HRUA
- Born: 1865; Craigavad, County Down, Ireland, United Kingdom of Great Britain and Ireland
- Died: 25 February 1950 (aged 84–85); Belfast, Northern Ireland
- Resting place: Balmoral Cemetery, Belfast
- Education: Académie Colarossi
- Alma mater: Belfast School of Art
- Known for: Landscapes

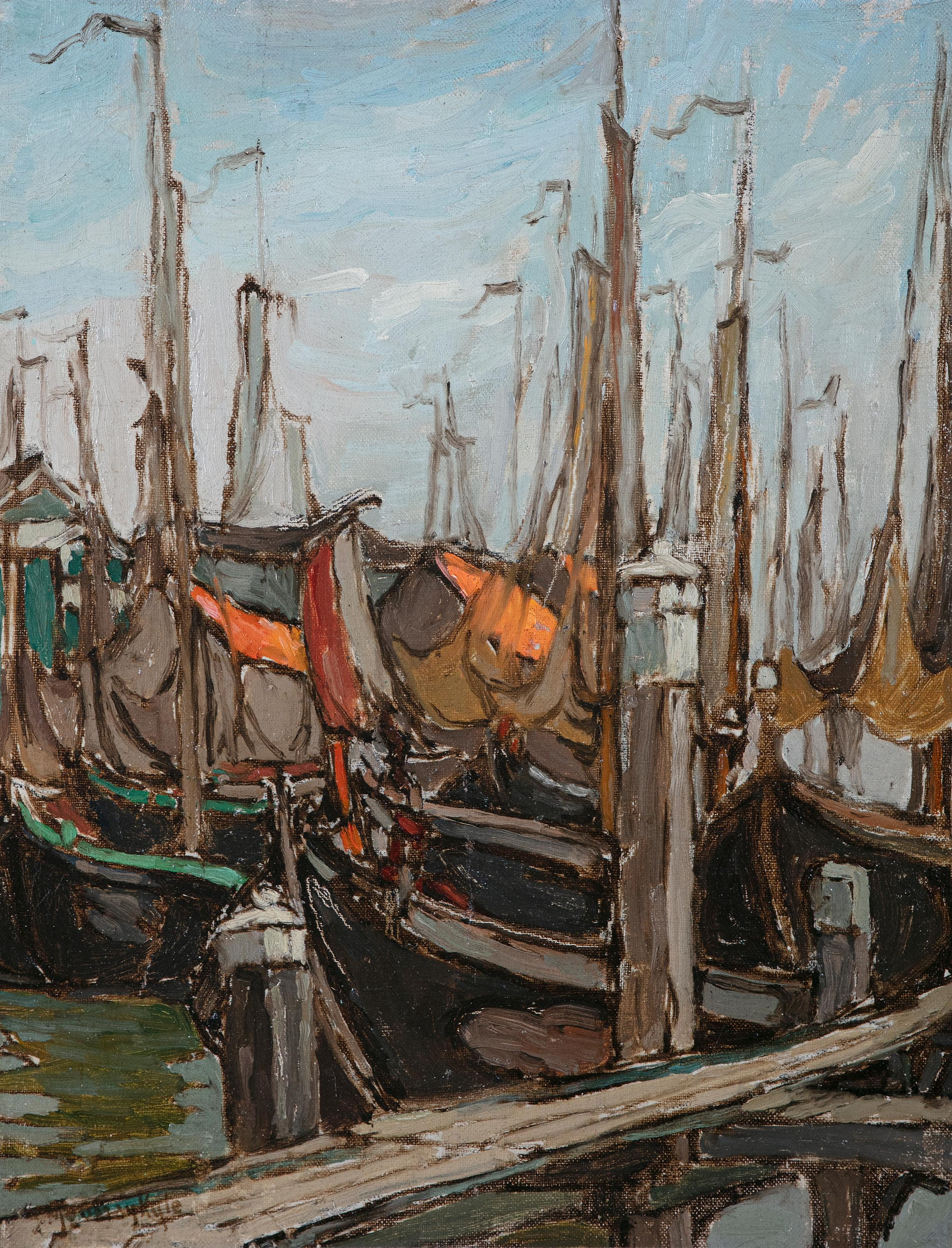
Boats, oils

Georgina Moutray Kyle HRUA (1865 – 25 February 1950) was a painter in watercolour, oils and pastel from Northern Ireland, and one of a select few Irish artists to have exhibited at the Paris Salon.

== Biography ==
Kyle was born in Craigavad, County Down and educated at home. She was the youngest daughter of the businessman George Wilson Kyle. Her niece Frances Kyle became the first woman admitted to the bar in Ireland. Kyle studied art at the Académie Colarossi in Paris beginning in 1883. Kyle then continued her studies at the Belfast School of Art, where she was to win prizes in consecutive years. She was financially independent and as such had no real need to sell her work, so often she would give paintings away. She was seen as eccentric and was an active Unionist, on occasion travelling to press the Unionist cause in London.

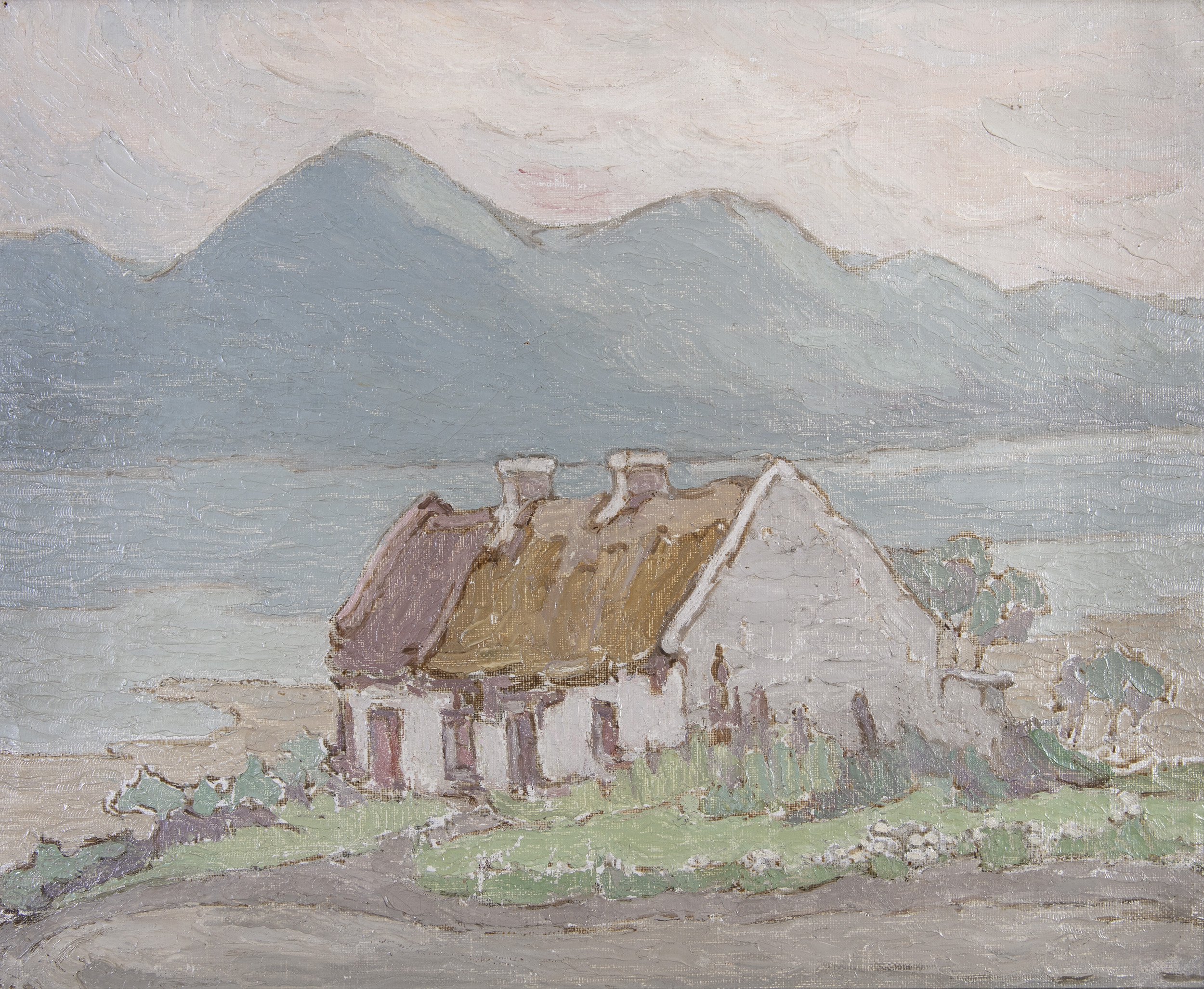
Scene in the Mourne Mountains, oils

On her return to Ireland, Kyle joined the Belfast Ramblers' Sketching Club. She exhibited her work in the Belfast Art Society from 1894 to 1928 where she was an active member, who became an honorary member in 1920. She was also a member of the Ulster Academy of Arts, where she was elected honorary Academician in 1930. She exhibited widely including at the Royal Hibernian Academy, Royal Institute of Oil Painters, Royal Society of Artists, and the Paris Salon. The Belfast Museum and Art Gallery held a retrospective of her work comprising more than sixty paintings in 1945. Kyle travelled extensively across Europe where she painted many market scenes and harbours, although still-life and flowers are also a feature. She spent many summers working in Ardglass.

She died at home on 25 February 1950 following a lengthy period of ill-health. In her last will and testament Kyle stipulated that she was not to be removed to a nursing home or hospital for treatment. She also requested that a surgeon remove one of her vital organs before burial and that she be interred beside her Mother. Her maid and friend Sarah Mallon was a beneficiary. Kyle bequeathed eight paintings to the Belfast Municipal Gallery.

The Naughton Gallery, Queen's University Belfast, held a retrospective of her work in 2004. Her work can be found in the collections of the Ulster Museum, the Royal Ulster Academy of Arts, North Down Museum, Queen's University Belfast, and Belfast City Council.
