= Albert Morrow =

Irish artist (1863–1927)

- Born: 26 April 1863; Comber, County Down, Ireland
- Died: 26 October 1927 (aged 64); West Hoathly, West Sussex, England
- Known for: Illustration, poster design, cartooning

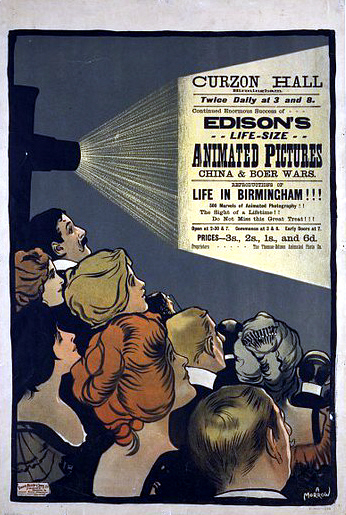
Albert Morrow: Colour lithograph poster advertising a cinematic showing at the Curzon Hall, Birmingham, c. 1902

Albert George Morrow (26 April 1863 – 26 October 1927) was an Irish illustrator, poster designer and cartoonist.

== Early life ==
Albert Morrow was born in Comber, County Down, the second son of George Morrow, a painter and decorator from Clifton Street in west Belfast. Of his seven brothers, four, George, Jack, Edwin, and Norman were also illustrators and all but one were artists. Morrow was a keen ornithologist in his youth. In later life Morrow was a keen walker and painted landscapes for leisure.

== Education and early works ==
Morrow was educated at the Belfast Model School and latterly at the Government School of Art in Belfast between 1878 and 1881.

Whilst studying under TM Lindsay at the Government School of Art in 1880, Morrow was awarded a £10 prize for drawing from the eminent publishers Cassell, Petter and Galpin. In 1881, whilst still learning his trade, Morrow painted a mural of Belfast for the Working Men's Institute in Rosemary Street, where his father was chairman. Later in that same year he exhibited a watercolour sketch of a standing figure entitled Meditative at the gallery of Rodman & Co., Belfast.

Morrow then won a three-year scholarship worth £52 per year which he took to the National Art Training School at South Kensington in 1882, where he began a lifelong friendship with the British sculptor Albert Toft. In 1883, whilst still attending South Kensington, Morrow joined the staff at the English Illustrated Magazine in preparation for the launch of the first edition. Two of Morrow's works were published in the Sunday at Home magazine in September of the same year. The magazine reviewer in the Northern Whig provides an indication of Morrow's skills at the time,

"Mr Morrow has a due appreciation of the effects of light and shade and his pictures especially, The Collector Calling for the Rent, would indicate a promising future."

Comyns Carr, first editor of the English Illustrated Magazine commissioned Morrow to complete a series on English industry when he had yet to complete his studies at South Kensington. In 1885 the writer from the Belfast Newsletter said of them,

"Some of the best [illustrations] are by Mr Albert Morrow, a young Belfast man who has already become recognised as one of the most conscientious and observant artists of the day. Mr Morrow's illustrations to the account of the china manufactures of Stoke-on-Trent will compare favourably with the drawings of the Fen country by so practised an artist as Mr RW Macbeth, ARA."

== Career ==
In 1890 he began illustrating for Bits and Good Words. He exhibited nine works at the Royal Academy of Arts between 1890 and 1904, all of which were watercolours, and with another in 1917, and an offering in chalk at the 159th Exhibition, in the year of his death.

Morrow became a member of the Belfast Art Society in 1895, exhibiting with them in the same year. In 1896 a Morrow print was published in Volume 2 of the limited-edition print-collection Les Maîtres de l'Affiche selected by "Father of the Poster" Jules Chéret. In the same year he showed a watercolour of a Gurkha at the Earls Court in the Empire of India and Ceylon exhibition. In 1900 Morrow exhibited with two Ulster artists, Hugh Thomson and Arthur D McCormick, at the Linen Hall Library in Belfast, who along with Morrow had contributed to the early success of the English Illustrated Magazine.

Morrow was one of the founders of the Ulster Arts Club in November 1902 along with five of his brothers, an organisation that had a non-sectarian interest in Celtic ideas, language and aesthetics. In November 1903 he exhibited at the first annual exhibition of the Club when he showed alongside John Lavery, Hans Iten, James Stoupe and FW Hull. Morrow exhibited The Itinerant Musician, a watercolour that he had previously shown at the Royal Academy in 1902. Honorary membership was conferred upon him the following year. Three years later he was honoured with a solo exhibition of sketches and posters in conjunction with the Ulster Arts Club, at the Belfast Municipal Gallery.

In 1908 Morrow joined his brothers in an exhibition at 15 D'Olier Street, Dublin, an address which was later to be registered to the family business in 1913. Amongst Morrow's contributions to the family exhibition was his painting of Brandon Thomas, The Clarionette Player, which had previously been exhibited at the Royal Academy, and a poster entitled Irving in Dante.

In 1917 he joined his brother George and 150 artists and writers, in petitioning the British Prime Minister Lloyd George to find a way of enacting the unsigned codicil to Hugh Lane's will and establish a gallery to house Lane's art collection in Dublin. Amongst the 32 notable artists who signed this petition were Jack B Yeats, Sir William Orpen, Sir John Lavery, and Augustus John.

Morrow illustrated books for children and adults, but he is best known for the hundreds of posters he designed for the theatre, with the bulk of his commissions coming from just one lithographical printers, David Allen and Sons. As a cartoonist he drew for children's annuals, and contributed three cartoons to Punch in 1923, 1925 and posthumously in 1931.

== Death and legacy ==
Albert George Morrow died at his home in West Hoathly, West Sussex, on 26 October 1927 aged 64. He was survived by his wife and two children. His headstone in the local churchyard at All Saints Church, Highbrook was designed by his friend, the sculptor and architect, Albert Toft.

Morrow's works can be found in many public and private collections such as the Victoria and Albert Museum, Musée des Arts Décoratifs, and the British Museum.
