= Pierre Montezin =

French painter

- Born: 16 October 1874; Paris, France
- Died: 10 July 1946 (aged 71); Moëlan-sur-Mer, France
- Occupation: Painter

Pierre Eugène Montézin (16 October 1874 – 10 July 1946) was a French painter. His work was part of the painting event in the art competition at the 1932 Summer Olympics. He was a close friend of the Swiss painter Hans Iten, and the Ulster Museum hold a portrait of Iten by Montezin donated by his widow.

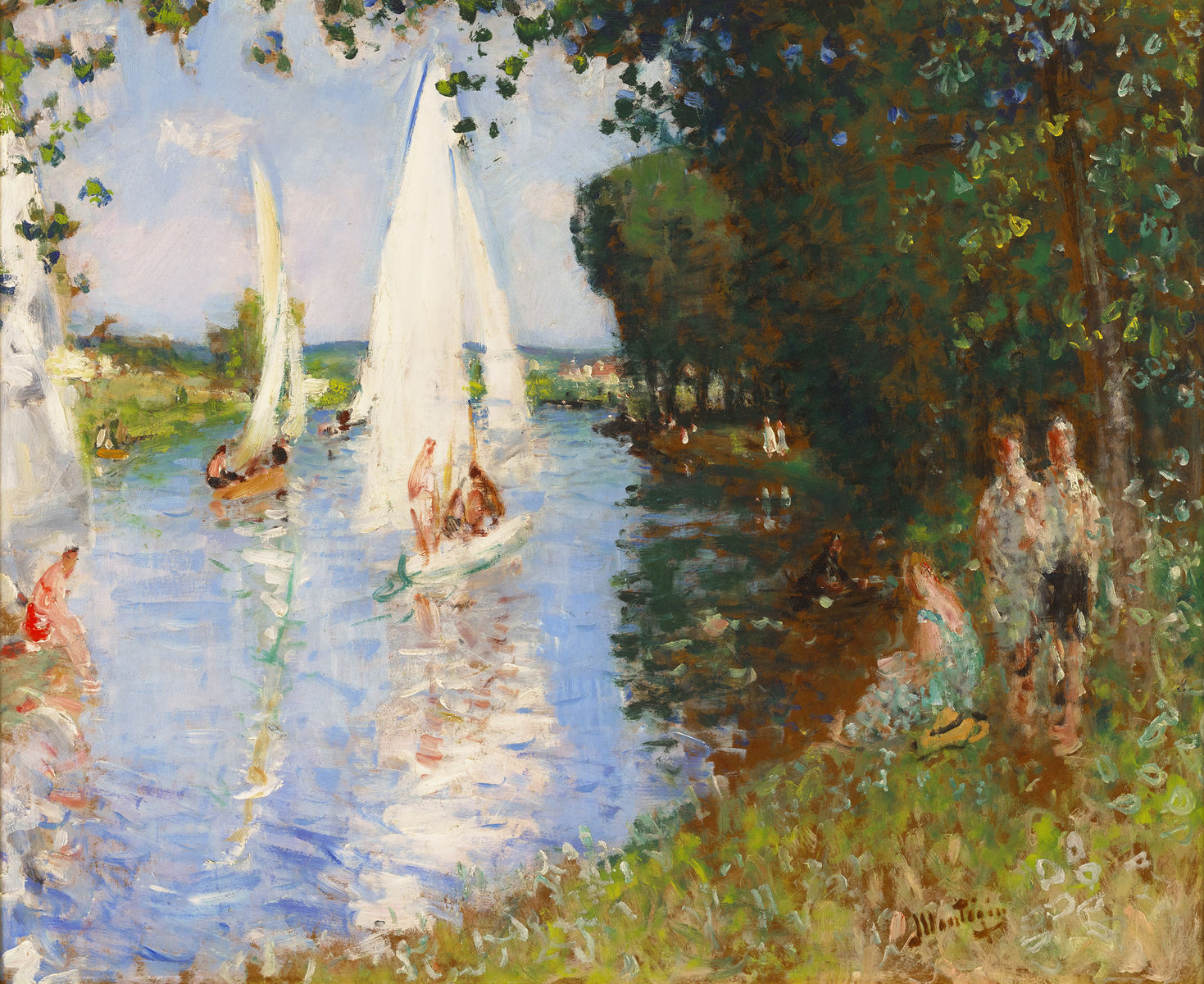
Voiliers sur la Seine by Pierre Eugène Montézin. Painted circa 1940-45. Oil on board.

== See also ==
- Pierre-Laurent Baeschlin – French artist
