= Pierre-Laurent Baeschlin =

French artist

- Born: September 23, 1886; Paris
- Died: Eaubonne
- Known for: Paintings

Pierre-Laurent Baeschlin (1886 – 1958) was a French artist known for his landscapes and still lifes involving flowers. A pupil of Pierre Montezin and Henri-Camille Danger, Baeschlin exhibited at the Salon des Artistes Français from 1912.

His works are mainly in British and French collections.

His daughter Germaine Madeleine Baschlin-Chapuis also became a painter specialized in flowers who exhibited at the Salon d'Automne and the Société des Artistes Indépendants from 1920.

== Sources ==
- "Benezit Dictionary of Artists" 2006
