= Henri-Camille Danger =

French artist

- Born: January 31, 1857; Paris
- Died: May 2, 1939; Fondettes
- Known for: Paintings

Henri-Camille Danger (1857–1939) was a French artist known for history paintings, allegorical and mythological subjects, genre scenes, landscapes and designs for tapestries.

== Early life and education ==
Henri-Camille was the son of Jules Félix Camille Danger, a tailor, and Marie Joséphine Tacheux. (Note: Paris address: 93 rue du Faubourg Poissonnière) He studied at the École des Beaux-Arts under Jean-Léon Gérôme and Aimé Millet, and exhibited his work at the Paris Salon from 1886 to 1937.

Danger was awarded the Prix de Rome in 1887 for his painting The Anger of Achilles Relieved by Minerva. This allowed him to study in Villa Medici between 1888 and 1891.

== Legacy ==
He debuted at the Salon of 1898 with The Great Artisans of Arbitration and Peace, boldly dedicated it to Alexander III of Russia. (Note: An ironic reference to the recently deceased Russian autocrat's many cruel practices, including his persecution of Russian Jews.)

A member of the Société des Artistes Français from 1899, he won a silver medal at the Exposition Universelle (1900), and was made a Chevalier of the Légion d'Honneur in 1903. His salon submissions included historical subjects such as The Hague Conference (1903), (Note: About the Hague Conventions) allegories such as The Great Designers of Arbitration and Peace, mythological subjects such as Venus with Two Gifts (1937), more intimate genre scenes, and landscapes of Italy.

He also produced sketches for tapestries for the Gobelins Manufactory, and illuminations in 15th-century style.

In 1999 his painting Aphrodite and Eros was sold for GBP 10,350. A year later Allegory of industry and labor fetched US$11,750. Both sales took place at Christie's.

His works can be found in private collections, at the Beaux-Arts de Paris, Musée d'Orsay, Petit Palais, Hôtel de Ville, Paris, Musée des Beaux-Arts de Tours and others.

== Gallery ==
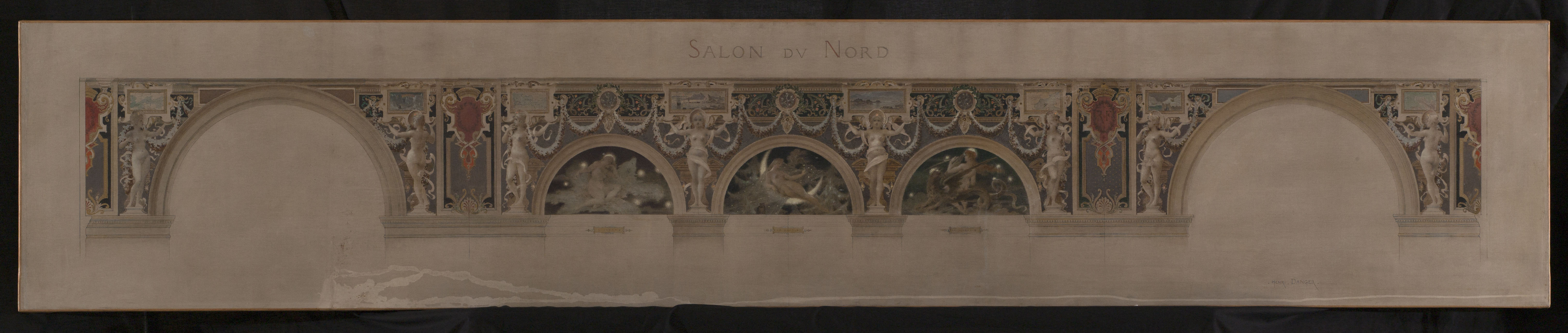
Sketch for the north entrance lounge of the Hôtel de Ville in Paris. The night. The Dragon. Petit Palais

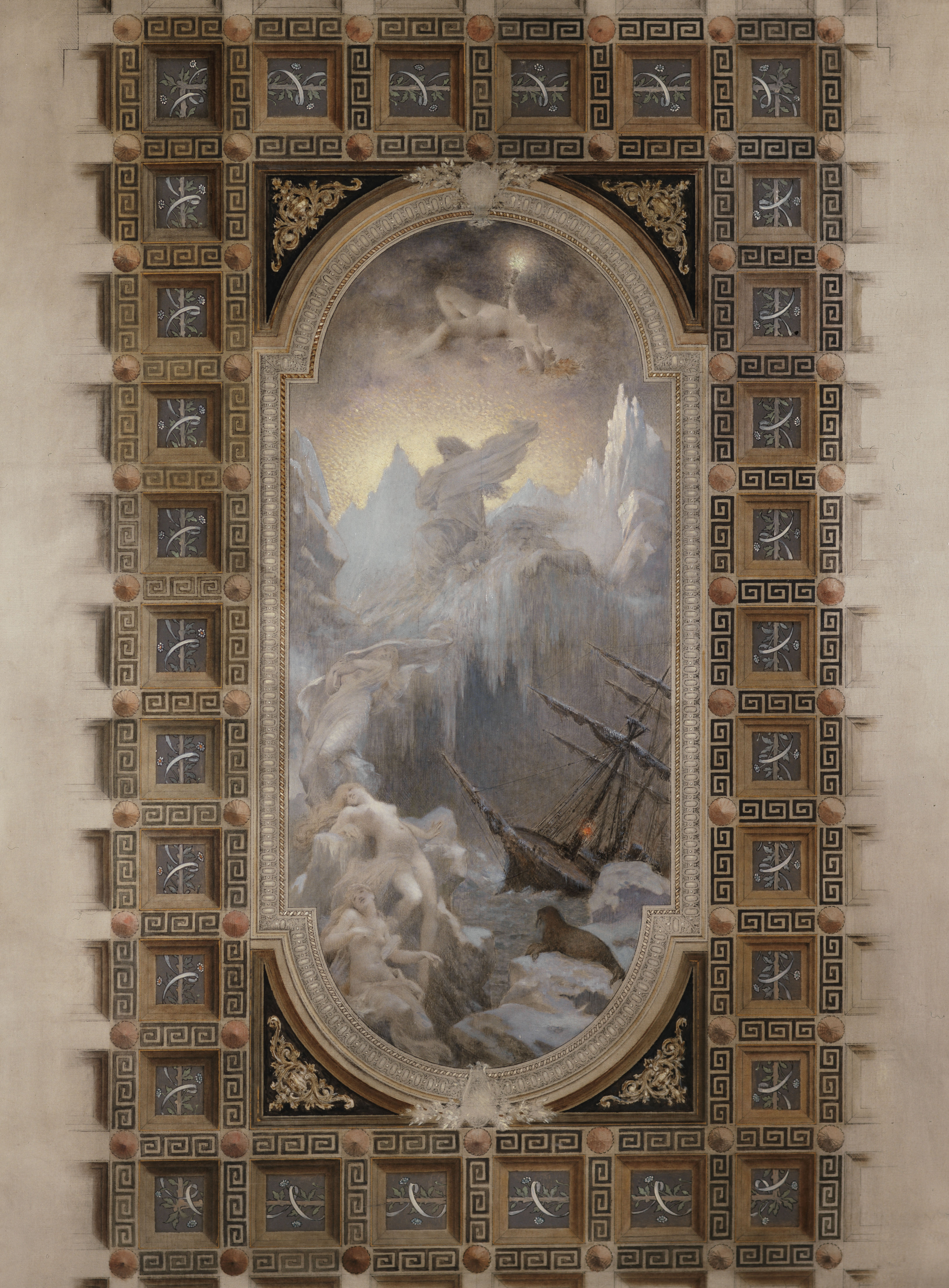
North entrance lounge: L'Aurore boréale, 1892 (ceiling), Petit Palais

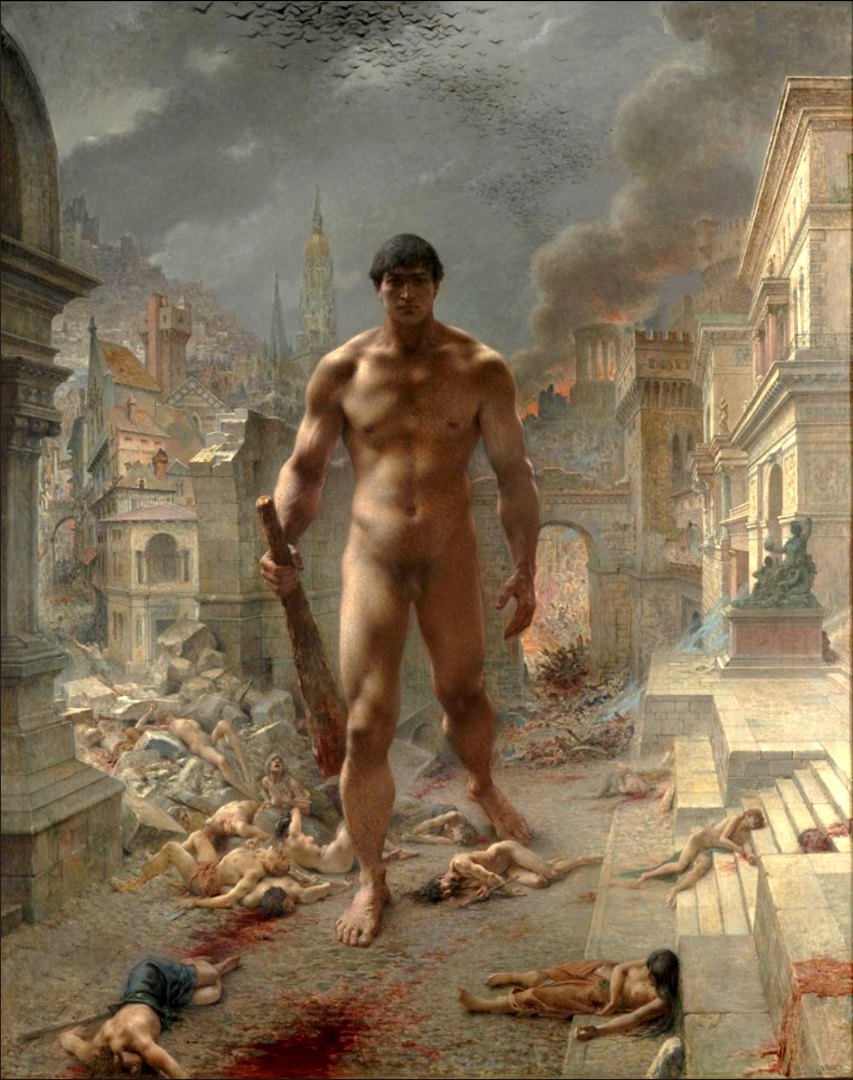
Fléau!, 1901, Musée d'Orsay

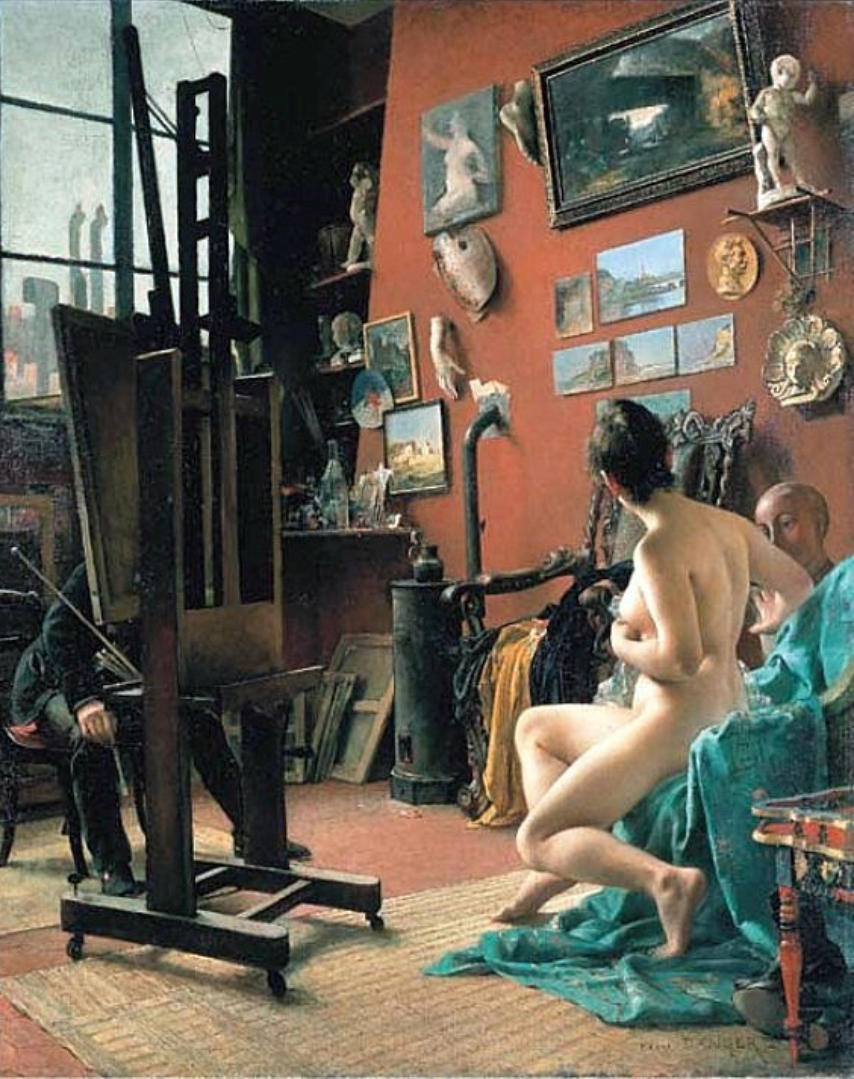
Chez un ami

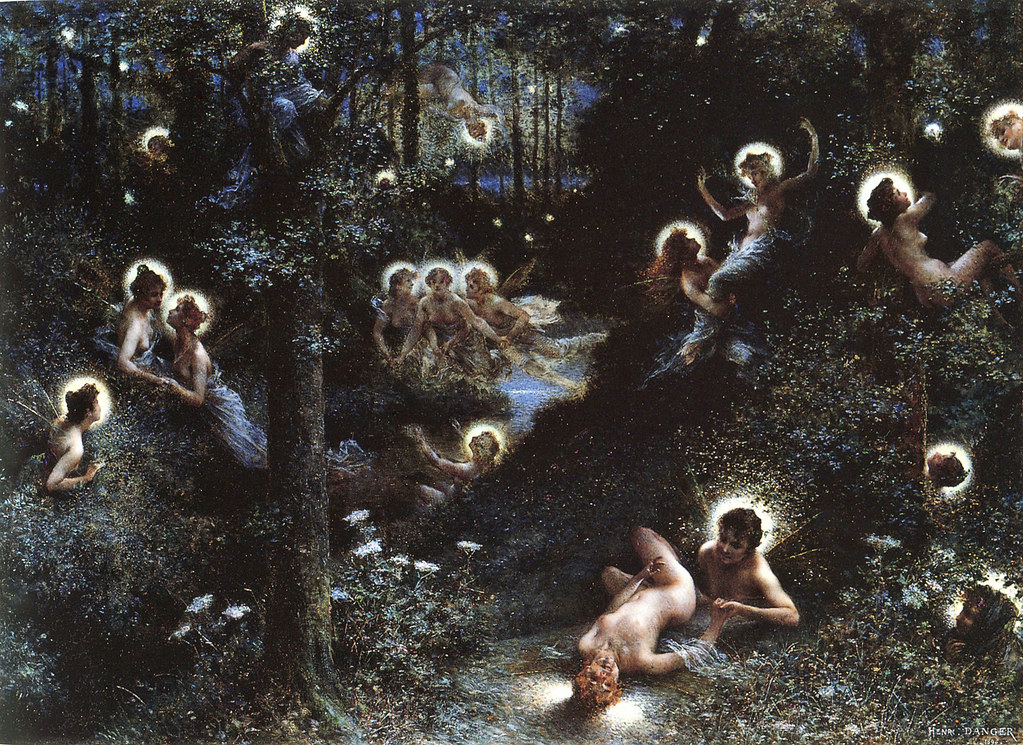
Les lucioles c. 1896

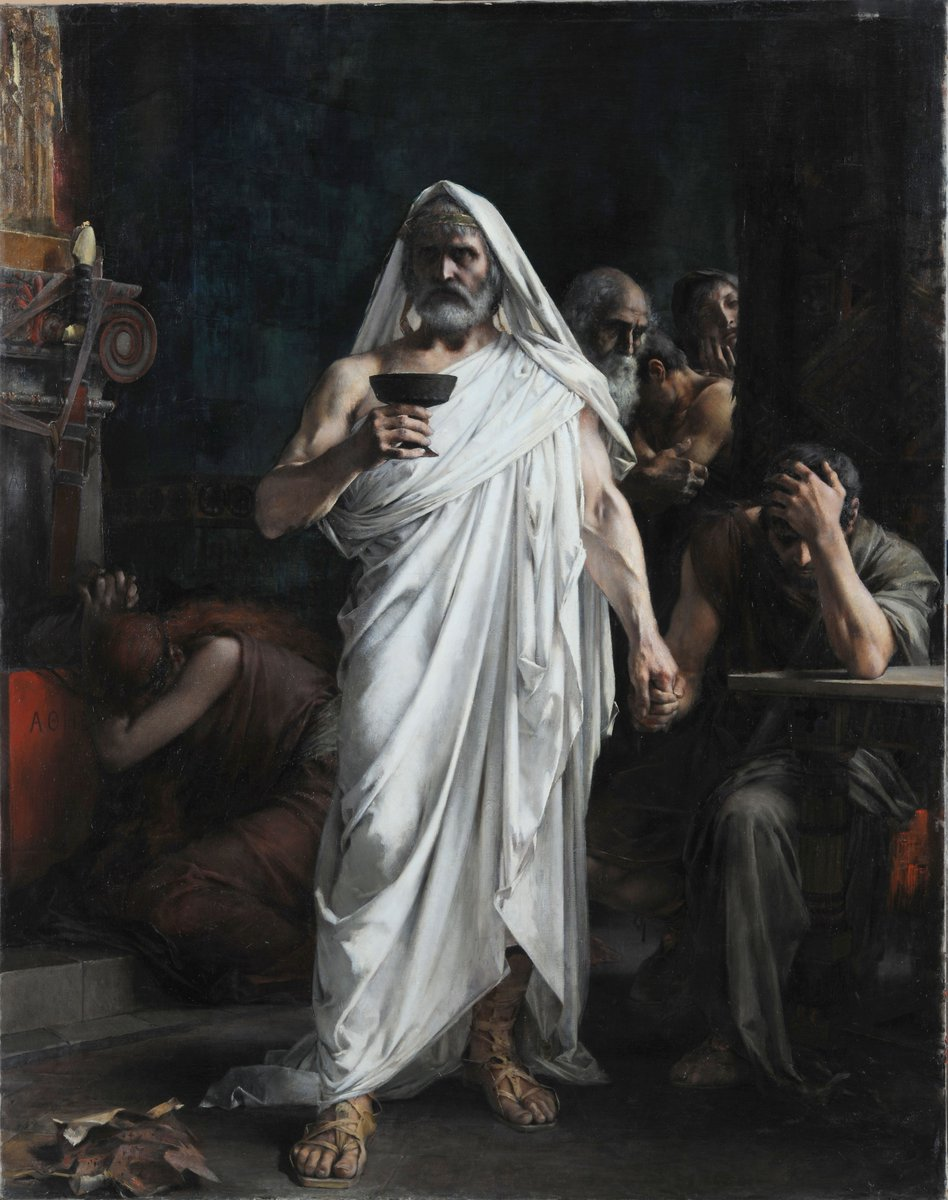
French: Thémistocle buvant le poison, 1887, Beaux-Arts de Paris

== See also ==
- Pierre-Laurent Baeschlin

== Sources ==
- "Benezit Dictionary of Artists" 2006
