= William Rooney =

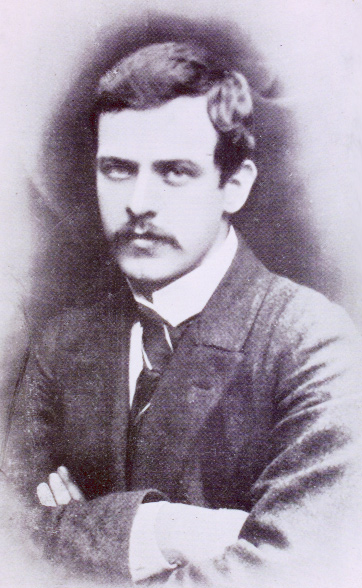
Rooney in the 1890s

William Rooney (Irish: Liam Ó Ruanaidh; 20 October 1873 – 6 May 1901), also known as Fear na Muintire, was an Irish nationalist, journalist, poet and Gaelic revivalist. Along with Arthur Griffith and Denis Devereux he founded the Celtic Literary Society, and with Griffith founded the first Cumann na nGaedheal.

== Life ==
William Rooney was born in Mabbot Street in Dublin, Ireland and educated by the Christian Brothers in Strand Street and North Richmond Street. As a boy he was a member of The Irish Fireside Club, a literary discussion group, where he became acquainted with Arthur Griffith around 1888. They joined the Leinster Debating Society (which became the Leinster Literary Society), where Griffith became president and Griffith secretary. After the Leinster Literary Society was dissolved in the wake of the Parnell controversies Rooney formed the Celtic Literary Society, of which he became president and editor of the society's journal, An Seanachuidhe. Along with Michael Cusack he taught Irish at the society's offices; one of their pupils was George Clancy.

His writings and articles appeared in United Ireland, The Shamrock, Weekly Freeman, The Evening Herald, Shan Van Vocht and Northern Patriot in Belfast.

He was persuaded by Eoin MacNeill to join the Gaelic League after its founding in 1893. As a member of the Gaelic League, which was mainly concerned with promoting the Irish language and literature, he favoured a more political approach to promoting Irish culture. He regarded Irish independence without the revival of the language and culture as meaningless.

He was active on the 1798 Rising commemoration committee. In 1899 he co-founded with Griffith the United Irishman newspaper. Rooney used multiple pseudonyms and wrote most of the papers articles. Rooney had encouraged Griffith to return from South Africa and edit the paper. In November 1900 along with Griffith he helped establish Cumann na nGaedheal. This was an umbrella organisation to co-ordinate the activities of a number of nationalist groups, with John O'Leary as president; it was merged in 1907 to form Sinn Féin. He spent some time travelling the country promoting the Irish language and condemned the Irish Parliamentary Party for its failure to promote the language.

He died suddenly of typhoid fever at the age of 27, shortly before he was due to be married to Máire Ní Cillín, in May 1901. Arthur Griffith was deeply affected by Rooney's death and continued to honor him long after his death. He was described by Griffith as "the Thomas Davis of the new movement". He is buried in Glasnevin Cemetery.

In the decade after the revolutionary period, the vital contribution of Rooney to the emergence of Sinn Féin was regularly acknowledged by many of those involved, including Brian O'Higgins, veteran of the 1916 Rising and President of Sinn Féin in the 1930s, who referred to him as "the real founder of Sinn Féin".

His poems include "The Men of the West", "Ninety Eight", and "An tSean Bhean Bhocht". A book of his poems was posthumously published in 1902, Poems and Ballads of William Rooney. The writer James Joyce gave Rooney's poems an unfavourable review in the Daily Express. Griffith responded by publishing Joyce's review in the United Irishman as an advertisement for Rooney's book of poems. His only emendation was the addition of a single word. Joyce had written that Rooney 'might have written well if he had not suffered from one of those big words which make us so unhappy.' Griffith merely inserted the word: patriotism. Somewhat ironically, Mabbot Street, where Rooney was born, is now called James Joyce Street.

In 2025, Dublin City Council unveiled a plaque to Rooney at his former home in Leinster Avenue. Rooney had held the first meeting of the Celtic Literary Society there in 1893, and had also died there in 1901. The plaque was proposed by historian Gerard Shannon and unveiled by Lord Mayor of Dublin Emma Blain. Additionally, a commemortive booklet for the occasion was produced by the historian and community activist David Connolly.

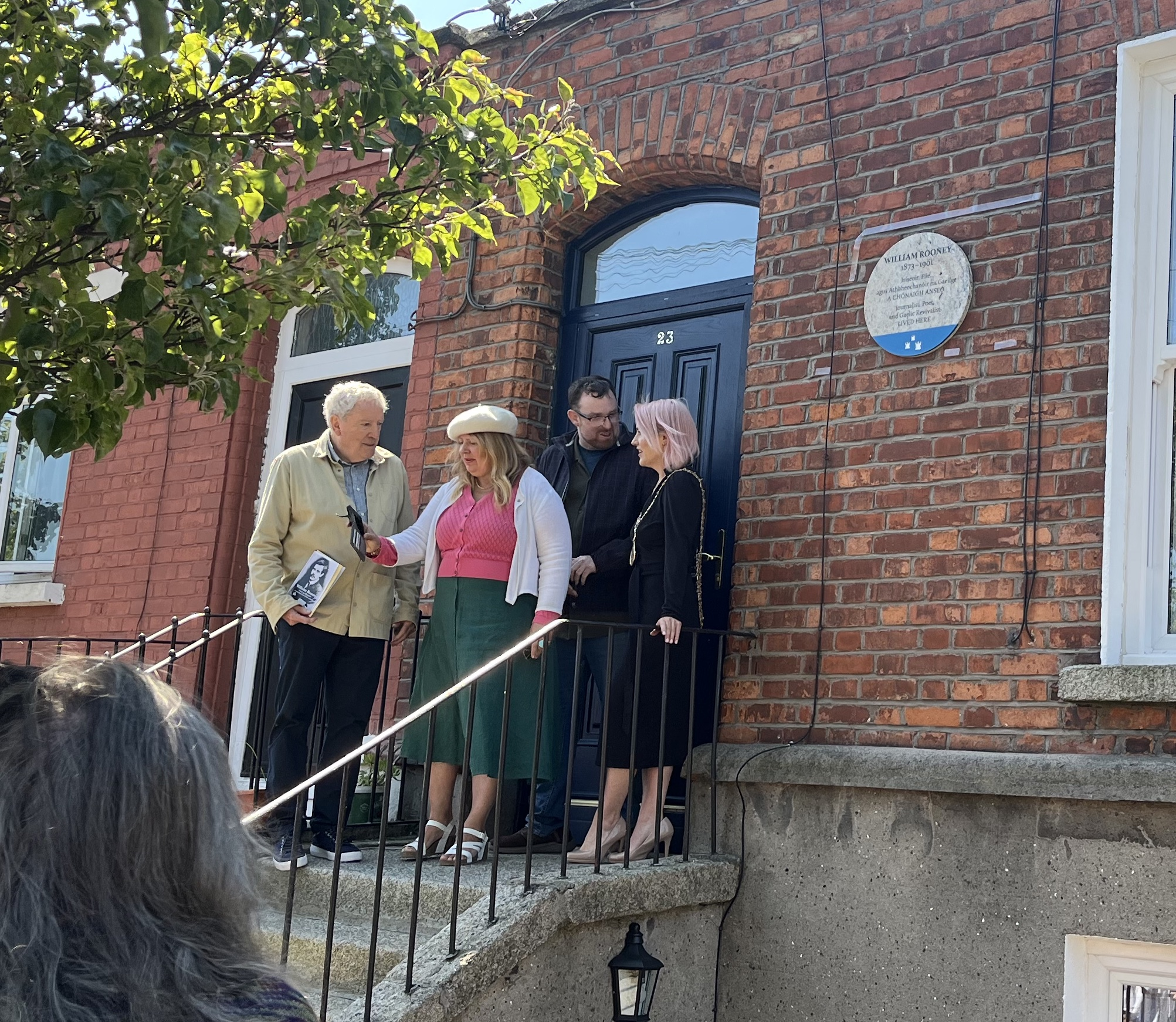
The unveiling of a plaque commemorating William Rooney on Leinster Avenue by Lord Mayor of Dublin Emma Blain and Deputy Lord Mayor Donna Cooney
