= James Ward (Irish artist) =

James Ward (1851–1924) Belfast-born artist, author and teacher. Ward was an important figure in the Irish and British art scene in the late 19th and early 20th century. He is best known in Ireland for his striking murals in Dublin City Hall depicting scenes from Dublin’s history. Besides being the author of influential textbooks, Ward was an innovative teacher who taught and inspired a generation of Irish artists.

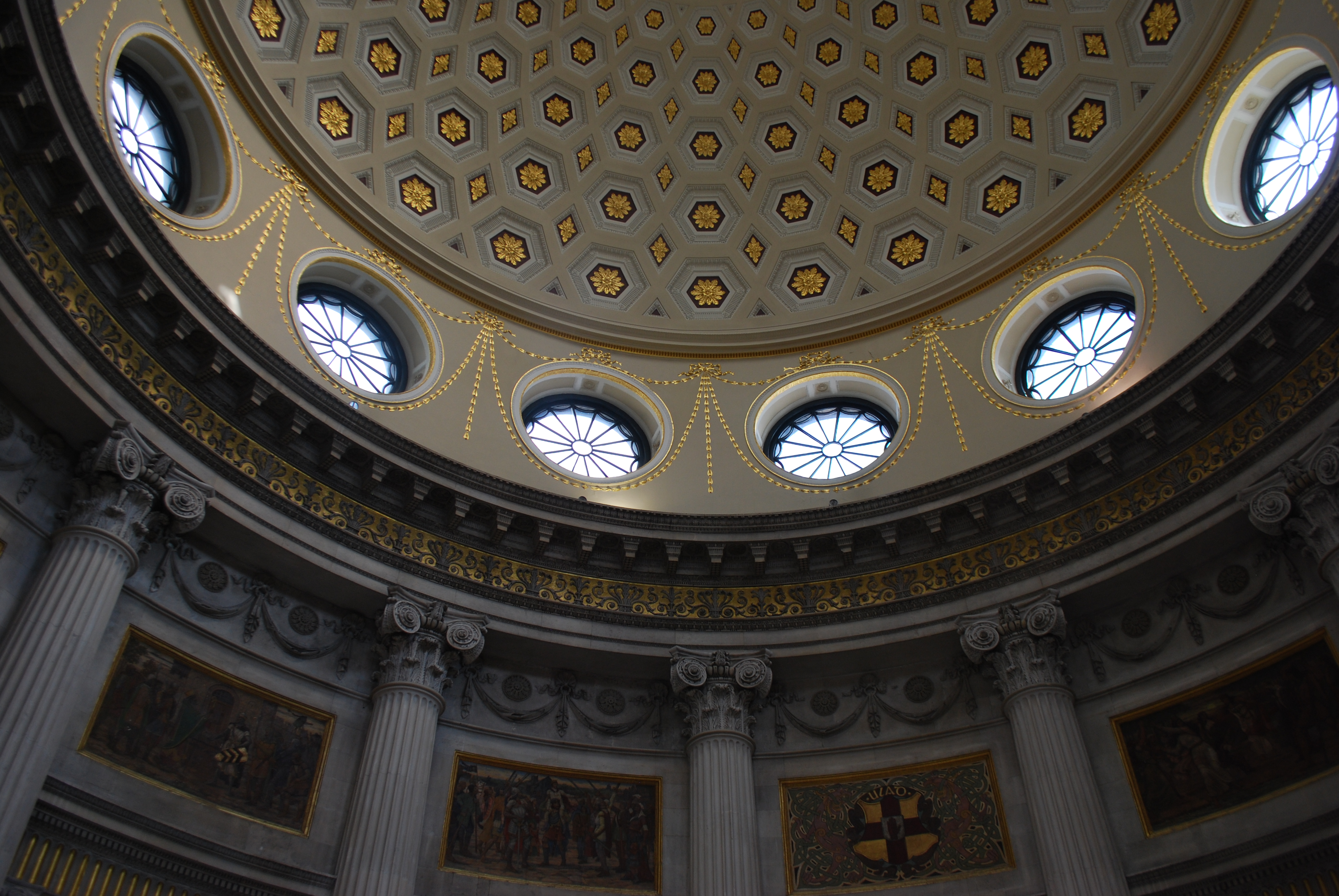
Rotunda, Dublin City Hall. Four of Ward's murals are visible in this picture

== Life ==
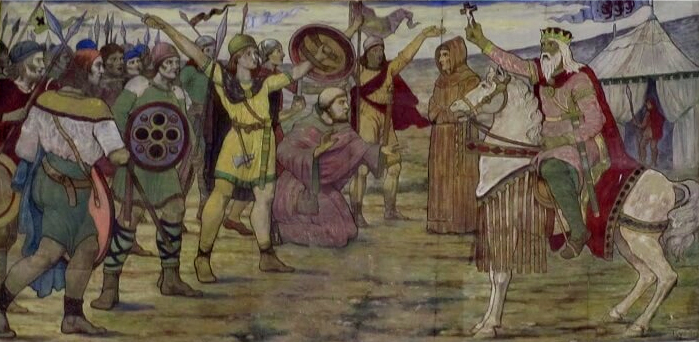
Ward's Brian Ború mural, Dublin City Hall

James Ward was born on 17 November 1851 at Gavin’s Buildings, Shankill Road, Belfast. He was the son of James Ward a house painter and decorative artist. Ward studied at the Belfast Government School of Art, and in 1872 he was awarded a scholarship to the National Art Training School, South Kensington, London. While there, he worked with Sir Edward Poynter who recommended him as an assistant to Sir Frederic Leighton. He assisted Leighton on the two vast murals Peace and War at the Museum of Ornamental Art in London (subsequently South Kensington Museum and now the Victoria and Albert Museum). He was Leighton's sole assistant until 1887, and wrote an account of the two frescoes for the Magazine of Art. He subsequently worked in art education, and was appointed head of Macclesfield School of Art in 1888. In 1907 he returned to Ireland (residing at 88 Marlborough Road, Dublin) as headmaster of the Dublin Metropolitan School of Art (now National College of Art and Design). His innovations there included introducing new classes of painting in spirit fresco and wood carving. He held that post until he retired in 1918.

Over his career, he exhibited at the Royal Academy of Arts, Belfast Art Society and the Royal Hibernian Academy, and his designs won prizes at the 1878 Paris Exposition and the 1884 London Health Exhibition.

Ward is best known in Ireland for the mural paintings in the rotunda of Dublin’s City Hall, undertaken on behalf of Dublin Corporation. The twelve frescoes consist of eight scenes from the early history of Dublin, and four heraldic panels representing the four provinces of Ireland. They were commenced in 1914 and completed in 1918. Ward was assisted by some of his students in the work, including Harry Clarke and Seán Keating.

On retirement, James Ward went first to England, and then to the home of his daughter in Southern Rhodesia (now Zimbabwe). He died there on 18 May 1924.

== Publications ==
Ward authored numerous books, many becoming standard teaching texts and widely translated.

- Colour harmony and contrast: for the use of art students, designers, and decorators (1912)
- Fresco painting: its art and technique (1909)
- History and methods of ancient & modern painting (1914)
- The principles of ornament (1896)
- Historical ornament: treatise on decorative art and architectural ornament (1892)
