= Hans Iten =

Swiss artist

- Born: 1874; Zurich, Switzerland
- Died: 1930 (aged 55–56)

Hans Iten (1874–1930) was a Swiss-born artist who specialised in landscape and flower painting in Ireland, and was considered the finest flower painter in Ireland during his lifetime.

== Life ==
Hans Iten was born in Zurich in 1874. He attended the School of Art in St Gall, studying drawing and painting. He worked for a time in Paris, where he became friends with Pierre Montezin. In 1904 he moved to Belfast to take up a position as a damask designer with linen manufacturers McCrum, Watson and Mercer Ltd. Iten shared a studio at 20 Rosemary Street.

Many of his landscapes featured County Antrim and County Down. He exhibited with the Royal Hibernian Academy from 1908 until his death, over 50 pieces in total. Iten became a member of the Belfast Art Society and was elected president in 1906, as well as serving as vice-president of the Ulster Arts Club. In 1930, he was among the first 9 members elected to the Ulster Academy. He also exhibited with the Society of French Artists, the Walker Art Gallery, Liverpool, the Fine Arts Society and the Royal Academy, London. In Ireland, he was known as "John", and was considered the finest flower painter in Ireland during his lifetime.

He died in Switzerland in 1930 while visiting. His work is held in a number of collections, including the Ulster Museum, the Hugh Lane Gallery, and Queen's University Belfast. The Arts Council of Northern Ireland mounted a retrospective exhibition of his work in 1971 with 1445 attendees. The Ulster Museum holds a portrait of him by Montezin.

In 2006, Iten's Still Life, Roses sold for £35,500 in Ross's, Belfast.
