= Cumann na nGaedheal (1900) =

Irish political organisation (1900–1907)

Cumann na nGaedheal (Irish: [ˈkʊmˠən̪ˠ n̪ˠə ˈŋeːl̪ˠ], lit. 'Society of the Gaels'), was a political organisation founded in 1900 by Arthur Griffith and William Rooney. Griffith had written an article in the United Irishman newspaper in March 1900, calling for the creation of an association to bring together the disparate nationalist groups of the time, and the result was the formation of Cumann na nGaedheal in September of that year.

In October 1900 Inghinidhe na hÉireann decided to affiliate themselves with the party and as a result were awarded representation on the governing council of the party. In 1903 Mark F. Ryan joined P. S. O'Hegarty on the executive council of Cumann na nGaedheal.

Griffith put forward his proposal for the abstention of Irish members of parliament from the Westminster parliament at the 1902 Cumann na nGaedheal convention.

In 1907 it merged with the Dungannon Clubs and the National Council to form the original Sinn Féin.
