= Ulster Literary Theatre =

Theatre company in Ulster, Ireland, 1904-1934

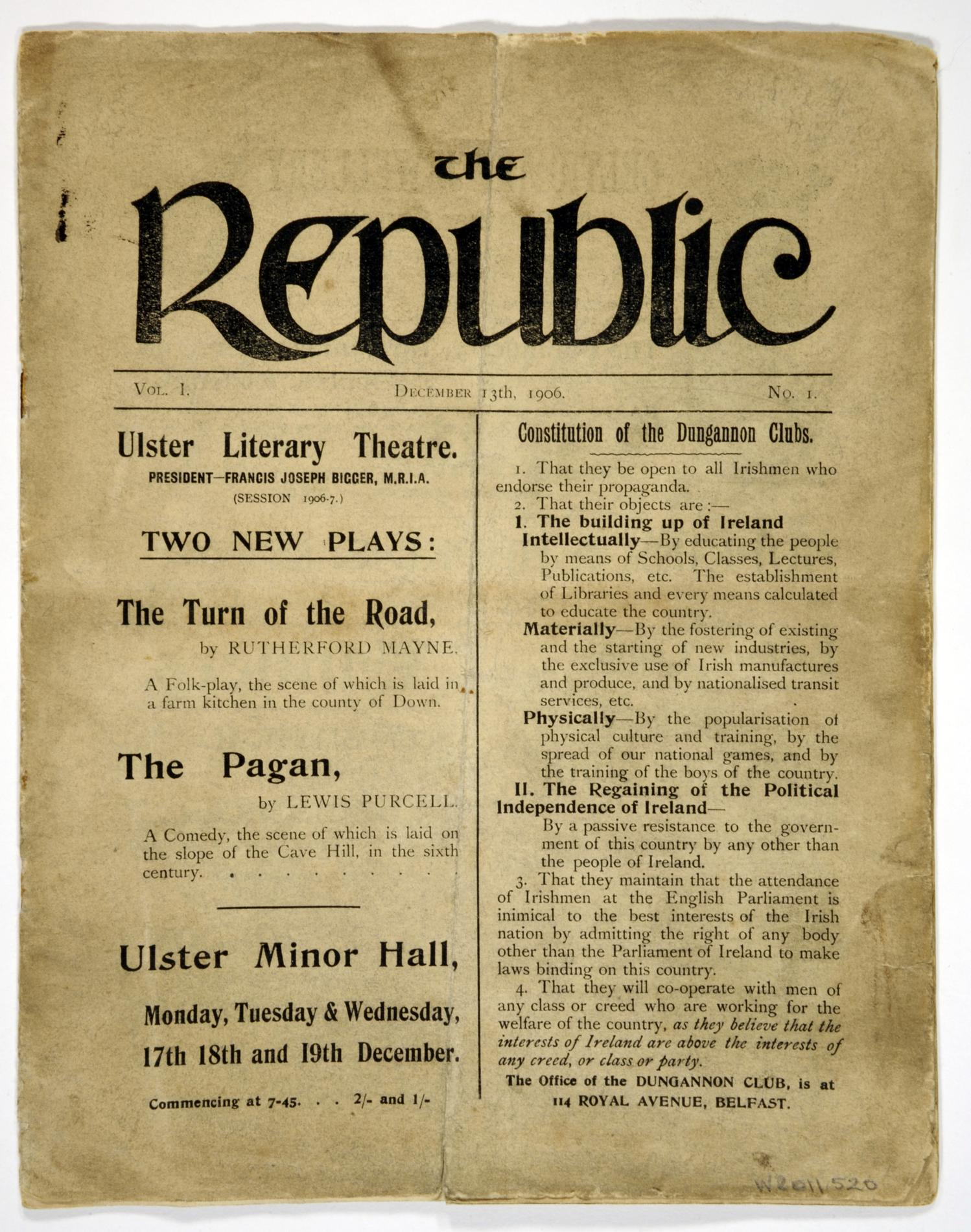
Another of Bulmer Hobson's enterprises was the Dungannon Clubs, whose newspaper was The Republic. This is the first page of its very first issue in 1906, showing an advertisement for the Ulster Literary Theatre's production of plays by Mayne and Purcell (Parkhill). Ulster Minor Hall was another name for St Mary's Minor Hall. This copy is in the collection of the Ulster Museum.

The Ulster Literary Theatre was a theatre company in Ulster (Ireland, now also Northern Ireland) from 1904 to 1934. It had a differently named precursor in 1902, and by 1915 it was named just the Ulster Theatre. It was founded by Bulmer Hobson and David Parkhill with patronage from Francis Joseph Bigger, who was also its first president.

== History ==
=== Precursor: The Ulster Branch of the Irish Literary Theatre in 1902 ===
Originally, Hobson and Parkhill envisaged an "Ulster branch" of W. B. Yeats' Irish Literary Theatre in Dublin, the pair having travelled to Dublin to see it in early 1902.

They put on two plays as the "Ulster branch" in 1902 in St Mary's Minor Hall in Ulster. Yeats was not involved in these productions, nor (according to Hobson) gave them any encouragement; and the involvement of the Irish Literary Theatre was largely limited to two of its performers, Dudley Diggs and Maire T. Quinn, travelling from Dublin to perform in Yeats' Cathleen ni Houlihan and James Cousins' The Racing Lug. Hobson and Parkhill actually put on Yeats' play without direct permission from Yeats, instead obtaining it from Maud Gonne who assured them that "He wrote that play for me and he gave it to me. It is mine and you can put it on whenever you want to." The lack of encouragement from Yeats, according to anecdote, caused Hobson to remark upon the return journey from Dublin to Belfast after having visited him "Damn Yeats! We'll write our own plays!".

This first production did not translate well to Ulster audiences, and the original plan of an eventual federation across the country linked back to the Irish Literary Theatre, failed. Gerald McNamara, later a playwright for the theatre, observed in particular about the central character of Yeats' play that "Ninety-nine percent of the population had never heard of the lady – and cared less.".

There were, moreover, complaints from the secretary of the Irish Literary Theatre, George Roberts, about the unauthorized use of its name, accompanied by requests for royalties to be paid on Yeats' play.

=== Foundation in 1904 ===
So Hobson and Parkhill founded the Ulster Literary Theatre in 1904, with plays from others including several by Parkhill, who wrote under the pseudonym Lewis Purcell, and with the goal of having its own distinct identity rather than being an offshoot of the Irish Literary Theatre. The Irish News described the goal of art that was "neither Dublin nor Munster nor English in its character and essentials, but Ulster in heart and soul". Hobson was later to describe their goal as that of "writing and producing distinctively Ulster plays, which would be a commentary on the political and social conditions in the North of Ireland".

Their 1904 production included George Russell's Deirdre at first, and towards the end of the year Hobson's Brian of Banba and Parkhill's/Purcell's The Reformers. The first issue of the theatre's journal Uladh (the word for Ulster in Irish, in the genitive), financed by Bigger, was published the same year.

=== Later ===
Later plays included Gerald McNamara's The Mist that Does Be on the Bog, first performed in 1909, and Rutherford Mayne's The Drone, first performed in 1908 and a staple of the company thereafter. The Drone and McNamara's Thompson in Tir-na-nOg were to prove widely popular with audiences. The latter resonated with Ulster audiences because of its use of language and cultural references that were specific to Ulster and current events of the time.

Parkhill's/Purcell' further plays included The Enthusiast (1905), The Pagan (1906), and Suzanne and the Sovereigns (1907 in collaboration with McNamara). McNamara's further plays included The Throwbacks (1917), No Surrender (1928), and Who Fears to Speak (1929).

In all, over the course of its lifetime the Theatre produced 47 original plays. Reflecting Hobson's originally stated goal, most of these were satirical in nature (some straight political satire, others satirical comedies), and only six were mythological.

By 1909 the company gained a permanent home in the Grand Opera House in Belfast, and by 1915 the company was simply named the Ulster Theatre.

Uladh did not last long. Financial difficulties caused the closure of the whole Theatre in 1934.
