= Bulmer Hobson =

Irish republican (1883–1969)

John Bulmer Hobson
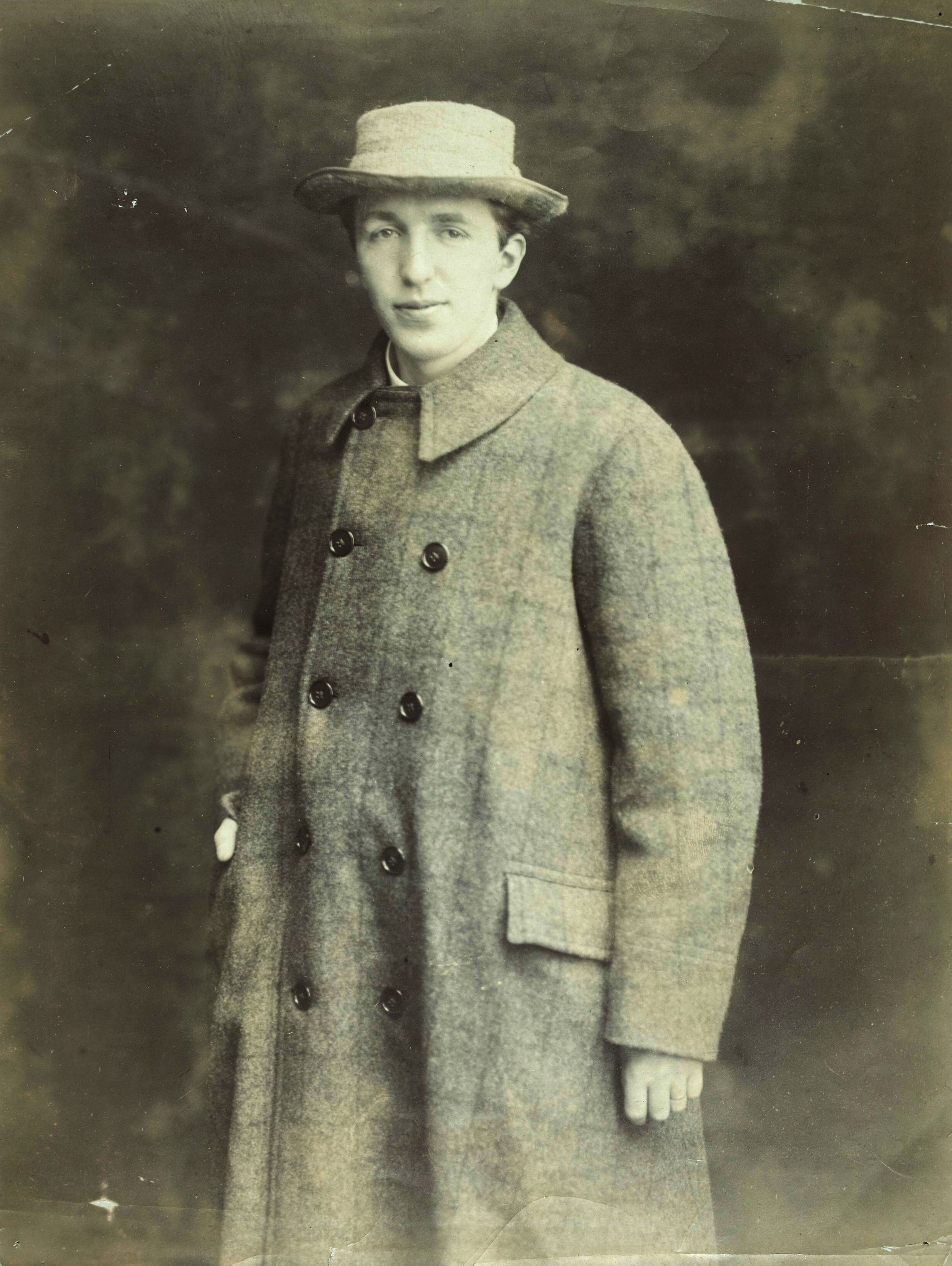
- Hobson circa 1916
- Born: 14 January 1883; Belfast, Ireland
- Died: 8 August 1969 (aged 86); Castleconnell, County Limerick, Ireland
- Burial place: Gurteen Cemetery near Roundstone, County Galway, Ireland
- Education: Friends' School, Lisburn
- Occupations: Journalist; Civil servant
- Known for: Irish Volunteers; Irish Republican Brotherhood; Dungannon Clubs; Fianna Éireann
- Spouse: Claire Gregan (died 1958)
- Children: 1 daughter (Camilla) 1 son (Declan)
- Parents: Benjamin Hobson (father); Mary Ann Bulmer (mother)

John Bulmer Hobson (14 January 1883 – 8 August 1969) was an Irish republican. He was a leading member of the Irish Volunteers and the Irish Republican Brotherhood (IRB) before the Easter Rising in 1916. Hobson swore Patrick Pearse into membership of the IRB in late 1913. He opposed and attempted to prevent the Easter Rising. Hobson was also chief of staff of Fianna Éireann, which he helped to found.

== Early life ==
Hobson was born at 5 Magdala Street, Belfast, to Benjamin Hobson, a grocer originally from County Armagh, and Mary Ann Bulmer, who was from England. However, numerous sources erroneously cite his place of birth as Holywood, County Down.

In 1901, the family was living in Hopefield Avenue in Belfast, before moving to the townland of Ballycultra, outside Holywood, by 1911.

Hobson had a "fairly strict" Quaker upbringing, according to Charles Townshend, possibly intensified by being sent to a Friends' boarding school in Lisburn. Hobson later resigned on principle from the Quakers soon after the 1914 Howth gun-running, as the Quakers are opposed to all forms of violence.

Bulmer's father was born in Armagh, although he later lived in Monasterevin, County Kildare, and was said to be a Gladstonian Home Ruler in politics, while his mother was an English-born radical. In 1911 she was reported to be on a suffragist procession in London and was long involved in Belfast cultural activities. She gave a lecture, entitled "Some Ulster Souterrains" as the Belfast Naturalists' Field Club's representative in 1901 at the British Association's annual meeting in Leicester. With the poet Alice Milligan, she organised the Irishwomen's Association, whose home reading circle met in the Hobsons' house. Hobson began at 13 to subscribe to a nationalist journal, Shan Van Vocht, published by Milligan. Soon after he joined the Gaelic League and the Gaelic Athletic Association.

== IRB and the Volunteers ==
Hobson was sworn into the IRB in 1904 by Denis McCullough, their head in Belfast. Together they founded the Dungannon Clubs, whose object was to celebrate the victory of the Volunteers of 1782 in restoring to Ireland her own Parliament, although they were additionally an "open front" for the IRB. The Volunteers of 1782 were an armed militia whose success, they suggested, could offer instructive lessons. The first Dungannon Club manifesto read: “The Ireland we seek to build is not an Ireland for the Catholic or the Protestant, but an Ireland for every Irishman Irrespective of his creed or class." Under the direction of Denis McCullough, Hobson became one of the key figures in the ongoing revitalisation of the IRB in Ulster, along with Seán Mac Diarmada, Patrick McCartan and Ernest Blythe.

Hobson moved to Dublin in 1907, and soon became a close friend of veteran Fenian Tom Clarke, with whom he had a very close relationship until 1914. In August 1909, with Constance Markievicz, he founded Na Fianna Éireann as a Republican scouting movement. In 1911 the republican newspaper Irish Freedom was founded, to which Hobson was an early contributor, and later that year he took over the editorship of it from Patrick McCartan.

Hobson was elevated to the IRB's Supreme Council in 1911, taking over as the Ulster representative from IRB leader, Neal O'Boyle which coincided with the resignations of P.T. Daly, Fred Allen and Sean O'Hanlon, opening the way for Tom Clarke and the younger men to take control of the IRB. In 1913 he was elevated to the chairman of the Dublin Centres Board of the IRB, and later that year was one of the founding organisers of the Irish Volunteers, remaining a primary connection between the Volunteers and the IRB. He put together the plan to bring sufficient Volunteers and their supporters, discreetly to Howth on Sunday, 26 July 1914, to unload and distribute the arms being landed from the Asgard at Howth.

As secretary and a member of the Volunteers provisional council, Hobson was instrumental in allowing Parliamentary leader John Redmond to gain control of the Volunteers organisation. He reluctantly gave in to Home Rule supporters' demands for control, believing that defying Redmond, who was popular with most rank-and-file Volunteers, would cause a split and would lead to the demise of the Volunteers. Clarke, steadfastly opposed to this action, never forgave him or spoke to him informally again. Hobson resigned as a member of the Supreme Council of the IRB, and was fired from his job as Dublin correspondent for the Gaelic American newspaper.

Hobson remained a member of the IRB, but, like the Volunteers' chief-of-staff Eoin MacNeill, he was kept unaware of the plans for the Rising. Though he could detect underground preparations, he had no certain evidence. He was later informed that volunteers had received orders for the Rising, timed for Easter Sunday, and he subsequently alerted MacNeill about what the IRB had planned. MacNeill issued a countermanding order, which served to delay the Rising by a day, and kept most of the Volunteers from participating. Hobson was kidnapped by Séamus O'Doherty on the orders of the organisers of the rising to stop him from spreading news of MacNeill's order, and held at gunpoint at O'Doherty's house in Phibsborough until the Rising was well underway. After the Rising, Hobson went to Eoin MacNeil's home of Woodtown Park to avoid arrest, an action which hurt his future political prospects and led to rumours that he was a traitor to the Volunteers and the IRB.

MacNeill later served in the Irish Free State government but Hobson was confined to a civil service job in the Department of Post and Telegraphs after Independence. Although he had been one of the most active members of the IRB for years, and was instrumental in the founding of the Volunteers, Hobson took no major role in politics after the Rising, or the subsequent Irish War of Independence (although he was later an occasional adviser to Clann na Poblachta). In 1922 he was appointed Chief of the Revenue Commissioners Stamp Department, the first of the departments that the IRB had infiltrated to any depth.

In 1947 he criticised the Rising and its leader saying the military council had "no plans.....which could seriously be called military" and that the Rising consisted of "locking a body of men up in two or three buildings to stay there until they were shot or burned out."

== Later years ==
Hobson's economic thinking during the 1930s drew heavily on the social credit theories of the British engineer Major C. H. Douglas, who argued that banks created money through simple bookkeeping and that the state could therefore issue credit for public works without recourse to taxation or borrowing. As a serving civil servant in the Office of the Revenue Commissioners, Hobson was obliged to publish much of his commentary on the subject anonymously or under a pseudonym, most notably in his 1933 pamphlet The New Querist, which posed almost two hundred economic questions in homage to Bishop George Berkeley's eighteenth-century work of the same name. In 1935 he founded a small monthly paper, Prosperity, published under the auspices of the League Against Poverty, which he renamed "Social Justice" the following year after the group reconstituted itself as the League for Social Justice. The paper folded in 1937 after 20 issues, having attracted fewer than 100 subscribers.

Hobson's social credit convictions also underpinned his collaboration with the Catholic social activists Fr Edward Cahill and Mrs B. Berthon Waters, with whom he drafted the Third Minority Report to the Commission on Banking, Currency and Credit (1938), a document that disputed the link with sterling and called for direct state investment in employment schemes. Hobson maintained that his ideas had anticipated those of John Maynard Keynes, noting that his own pamphlets predated the 1936 publication of The General Theory of Employment, Interest and Money, and dismissing critics who characterised his work as mere imitation. Reviewing Marnie Hay's 2009 biography of Hobson, the writer Jeffrey Dudgeon described him as having become "a follower of Social Credit and an early advocate of quantitative easing or the government printing money".

Hobson was interested in the Esperanto language; after his death, an Esperanto dictionary and a novel were found in his library.

After his retirement in 1948, Hobson built a house near Roundstone, Connemara. His wife Claire (née Gregan), from whom he had separated in the late 1930s, died in 1958. After suffering a heart attack in the 1960s, Hobson lived with his daughter and son-in-law, Camilla and John Mitchell, in Castleconnell, County Limerick, where he finished his account of his life, titled Ireland, Yesterday and Tomorrow (Anvil Books, Ireland, 1968).

== Published works ==
- A short history of the Irish volunteers (1918)
- (as editor) The letters of Wolfe Tone (1920)
- (as editor)The life of Wolfe Tone (1921)
- The New Querist: containing several queries, proposed to the consideration of the public (1933), Dublin: Candle Press
- Ireland, Yesterday and Tomorrow (1968), Anvil Books

== See also ==
- Protestant Irish nationalists

== Sources ==
- Coogan, Tim Pat1916: The Easter Rising, (Phoenix 2001) ISBN 0-7538-1852-3.
- Dudgeon, Jeffrey Roger Casement: The Black Diaries with a Study of his Background, Sexuality and Irish Political Life, (Belfast Press 2002).
- Hay, Marnie Bulmer Hobson and the Nationalist Movement in Twentieth—Century Ireland, (MUP 2009), ISBN 978-0-7190-7987-0.
- Jackson, T.A Ireland Her Own, Lawrence & Wishart, Fp 1947, Rp 1991, ISBN 0-85315-735-9.
- Martin, F.X (ed.), Leaders and Men of the Easter Rising: Dublin, 1916, (London 1967).
- O'Hegarty, P.S A History of Ireland Under the Union, (Dublin 1952).

Party political offices
Preceded by John Sweetman	Vice President of Sinn Féin; 1907–1910 with Arthur Griffith (1907–1908)	Succeeded by Thomas Kelly
