= Dungannon Clubs =

Irish political organisation (1905–1907)

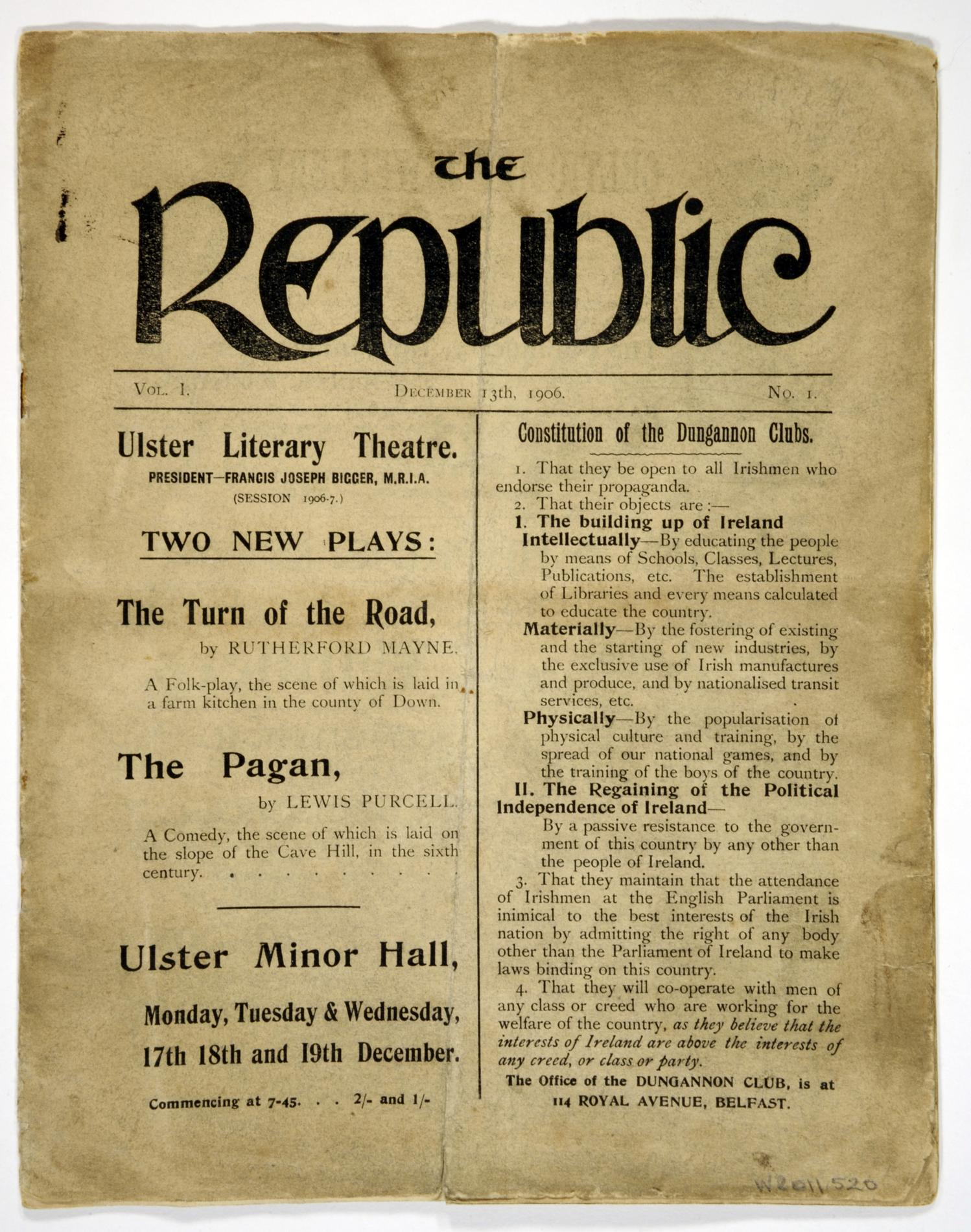
Hobson also founded the clubs' newspaper, The Republic. This is the first page of its very first issue in 1906, showing an advertisement for the Ulster Literary Theatre (another of Hobson's enterprises) and some of the Dungannon Club constitution. This copy is in the collection of the Ulster Museum.

The Dungannon Clubs were founded in Belfast, Ireland, in 1905, by Bulmer Hobson and Denis McCullough, whose goal was the eventual creation of an Irish Republic. They were named after the Dungannon Convention of 1782.

Seán McDermott became the organizer for the clubs in Belfast, Dublin, Glasgow, London, and various other places in Ulster in 1906. A club in Carrickmore was organized by Patrick McCartan for a brief period in 1905, until he went to Dublin to study.

The phrase Sinn Féin (meaning 'we ourselves') had been in use since the 1880s and was used as a slogan by the Gaelic League from the 1890s. The Dungannon Clubs considered themselves to be part of a 'Sinn Féin movement'.

By 1907, there was pressure on the Irish republican organizations to unite, and the American residing John Devoy made an offer to fund a unified party. In that year, Charles Joseph Dolan, the Irish Parliamentary Party member of the House of Commons of the United Kingdom for North Leitrim, announced his intention to resign his seat and contest it on a Sinn Féin platform. In April 1907, Cumann na nGaedheal (1900), the Gaelic League and the Dungannon Clubs merged as the 'Sinn Féin League' or Organization. In August 1907, the National Council agreed to merge with the new League to form Sinn Féin, with the foundation backdated to the National Council convention of November 1905.
