= 1920 in Ireland =

- Centuries: 18th; 19th; 20th; 21st
- Decades: 1900s; 1910s; 1920s; 1930s; 1940s
- See also: 1920 in the United Kingdom; Other events of 1920; List of years in Ireland

Events from the year 1920 in Ireland.

== Incumbents ==
- President of Dáil Éireann: Éamon de Valera
- Minister for Finance: Michael Collins
- Dáil: 1st

== Events ==
- 2 January – Irish Republican Army (IRA) volunteers of the 1st Cork Brigade (commanded by Mick Leahy) captured Carrigtwohill Royal Irish Constabulary (RIC) barracks, the first such attack carried out as official Republican policy.
- 26 January – A fire in the Mary Immaculate, Refuge of Sinners Church in Rathmines, Dublin destroyed the interior, roof and dome.
- 27 February – The text of the Home Rule Bill to be introduced in the House of Commons of the United Kingdom was published. It provided for the establishment of a 128-member parliament in Dublin and a 52-member parliament in Belfast.
- 3 March – Land agent Frank Shawe-Taylor was shot dead over a dispute with a landowner in an ambush by IRA members in County Galway, leading to widespread unrest.
- 10 March – The Ulster Unionist Council accepted the Government's plan for a Parliament of Northern Ireland.
- 20 March – The Sinn Féin Lord Mayor of Cork (since January), Tomás Mac Curtain, was murdered by armed and disguised RIC men who broke into his home on his 36th birthday.
- 22 March – Thousands gathered to pay their respects to the murdered Tomás Mac Curtain. Over 8,000 IRA Volunteers lined the route to St. Finbarr's Cemetery in Cork City. He was succeeded as Lord Mayor by Terence MacSwiney.
- 25 March – British recruits to the RIC began to arrive in Ireland. They become known from their improvised uniforms as the "Black and Tans".
- 31 March – In the second reading debate in the Parliament of the United Kingdom on the Government of Ireland Bill, Unionist leader Sir Edward Carson opposed the division of Ireland, seeing it as a betrayal of Unionists in the south and west.
- 2 April – Canadian-born lawyer Sir Hamar Greenwood was appointed Chief Secretary for Ireland.
- 5 April – IRA prisoners began the 1920 hunger strike in Mountjoy Prison, Dublin, demanding prisoner of war status.
- 13–14 April – Irish Trades Union Congress staged a general strike in support of the Mountjoy hunger strikers, securing their release.
- 15 April–8 June: Arthur Griffith established a Republican legal system (under Austin Stack) in areas under IRA control. The traditional summer assizes become virtually unworkable.
- 2 May – Viscount Fitzalan was sworn in as Lord Lieutenant of Ireland, the first Catholic to hold the viceroyalty since the reign of King James II.
- 10 May – Forty Irish republican prisoners on hunger strike at HM Prison Wormwood Scrubs in London were released.
- 17 May – Sinn Féin supporters and Unionists engaged in pitched street battles in Derry.
- 20 May – "Munitions strike": Dublin dock workers refused to handle British military material, and were soon joined in the boycott by members of the Irish Transport and General Workers Union.
- 22 May – In Rome, Pope Benedict XV beatified Oliver Plunkett.
- 4 June – The IRA ordered a boycott of the RIC and their families.
- 17 June – "The Listowel Mutiny": RIC constables based at Listowel refused orders to assist the British Army. The RIC was ordered to shoot armed IRA men who did not surrender when challenged.
- 20 June – Five died in severe rioting in Ulster.
- 24 June – Troops were sent to reinforce the Derry garrison.
- 29 June – Dáil Courts were established to hear civil cases.
- 6 July – Kingstown urban district council resolved to revert to the port town's historic name of Dún Laoghaire.
- 21 July – Protestants expelled Catholic workers from the Harland and Wolff shipyard in Belfast, referred to as the Belfast Pogrom.
- 23 July – Fourteen people died and one hundred were injured in fierce rioting in Belfast.
- 27 July – The first recruits – former British Army officers – joined the RIC's Auxiliary Division.
- 31 July – County Cork-born Australian Catholic Bishop Daniel Mannix was detained on board ship off Queenstown and prevented from landing in Ireland.
- 3 August – Catholics rioted in Belfast in protest at the continuing British Army presence.
- 13 August – The Restoration of Order in Ireland Act received royal assent, providing for Irish Republican Army activists to be tried by court-martial rather than by jury in criminal courts.
- 15 August – The town hall at Templemore was burned down during the disturbances.
- 19 August – Following his conviction by court martial for sedition, the Lord Mayor of Cork, Terence MacSwiney, went on hunger strike in Brixton Prison in London.
- 24 August – Special constables were enrolled following rioting in Ulster.
- 20 September – "Sack of Balbriggan" in County Dublin: Black and Tans destroyed more than fifty properties in the town.
- 28 September – There were disturbances at Mallow, County Cork, when a raid on a military barracks by Liam Lynch and Ernie O'Malley was followed by a sack of the town by British soldiers.
- 30 September – "Sack of Trim" in County Meath: Black and Tans destroyed properties in the town following the previous day's raid on an RIC barracks by the IRA.
- 22 October – The formation of the Ulster Special Constabulary was announced, an armed and predominantly Protestant police reserve.
- 25 October – Lord Mayor of Cork, Terence MacSwiney, died in Brixton Prison in London on the 74th day of his hunger strike.
- 31 October – Terence MacSwiney was buried in St. Finbarr's Cemetery in his native Cork City. Arthur Griffith delivered the graveside oration.
- 1 November –
  - Killing of Eileen Quinn: A 24-year-old pregnant mother was shot and killed by the Black and Tans in County Galway.
  - An 18-year-old medical student, Kevin Barry, was executed in Mountjoy Prison for participating in the killing of three young unarmed British soldiers.
- 12 November – A hunger strike in Cork Prison was called off after the Sinn Féin President, Arthur Griffith, intervened.
- 21 November – Bloody Sunday: The Irish Republican Army, on the instructions of Michael Collins, shot dead the "Cairo gang", fourteen British undercover agents in Dublin, most in their homes. Later that day, in retaliation, the Auxiliary Division of the Royal Irish Constabulary opened fire on a crowd at a Gaelic Athletic Association football match in Croke Park, killing thirteen spectators and one player, and wounding 60. Three men were shot that night in Dublin Castle "while trying to escape".
- 22 November – IRA Captain Patrick McCarthy was shot dead during an ambush on Black and Tans at Millstreet.
- 26 November – Acting President Arthur Griffith was arrested and jailed for seven months.
- 28 November – Kilmichael Ambush: The flying column of the 3rd Cork Brigade IRA, led by Tom Barry, ambushed two lorries carrying Auxiliaries at Kilmichael, County Cork, killing seventeen (with three of its men also dying), which led to official reprisals.
- 10 December – Martial law was declared in Counties Cork, Kerry, Limerick and Tipperary.
- 11 December – The Burning of Cork: British forces set fire to some 5 acres (20,000 m^{2}) of the centre of Cork City, including the City Hall, in reprisal attacks after a British auxiliary was killed in a guerrilla ambush.
- 23 December
  - The Government of Ireland Act 1920, passed by the Parliament of the United Kingdom, received royal assent from George V providing for the partition of Ireland into Northern Ireland and Southern Ireland with separate parliaments, granting a measure of home rule.
  - Éamon de Valera returned to Ireland after attempting to secure support from the United States for the Irish Republic.

== Arts and literature ==
- May – The poet W. B. Yeats concluded a lecture tour in the United States (begun in October 1919) and returned to settle in Oxford, England. In this year, also, he published The Second Coming.
- 10 August – La Scala Theatre and Opera House, Dublin opened as a cinema.
- Castleisland's Carnegie library was opened and destroyed by fire.
- Hamilton Harty became chief conductor of the Hallé Orchestra in Manchester, England.

== Sport ==
=== Association football ===
- International matches
  14 February – Ireland 2–2 Wales (in Belfast).
  13 March – Scotland 3–0 Ireland (in Glasgow).
  23 October – England 2–0 Ireland (in Sunderland).
  Irish League
  Winners: Belfast Celtic.
  Irish Cup
  Winners: Shelbourne (final not played). Disorder at the other semi-final, which was abandoned, meant that both potential opponents were excluded from the competition, and the Irish Football Association awarded the cup to Shelbourne.

=== Gaelic games ===
- The All-Ireland Champions were Dublin (hurling) and Tipperary (football).

=== Golf ===
- The British Ladies Amateur Golf Championship was held at Royal County Down Golf Club (winner: Cecil Leitch).

== Births ==
- 15 February – Bill Collins, footballer (died 2010).
- 7 March – Eilís Dillon, author (died 1994).
- 13 April – Liam Cosgrave, fifth taoiseach and leader of the Fine Gael party (died 2017).
- 15 April - Jim McFadden, professional ice hockey player (died 2002).
- 30 April – Duncan Hamilton, motor racing driver (died 1994).
- 19 May – Joe Cahill, Chief of Staff of the Provisional Irish Republican Army (died 2004).
- 21 May
  - John V. Luce, classicist (died 2011).
  - James Plunkett, novelist, author of Strumpet City (died 2003).
- 22 May – Oliver Flanagan, Fine Gael party teachta dála (TD) and cabinet minister (died 1987).
- 27 May – Joseph Caprani, cricketer.
- 2 June – Michael O'Hehir, sports commentator and journalist (died 1996).
- 5 June – Cornelius Ryan, journalist and author (died 1974).
- 12 June – Eoin Ryan, Fianna Fáil party senator (died 2001).
- 17 August – Maureen O'Hara, film actress (died 2015).
- 21 August – Rinty Monaghan, boxer (died 1984).
- 27 August – James Molyneaux, Unionist politician and leader of the Ulster Unionist Party from 1979 to 1995 (died 2015).
- 12 October – Christy Ring, Cork hurler (died 1979).
- 16 October – Paddy Finucane, Royal Air Force fighter pilot, youngest Wing Commander in RAF history (killed in action over the English Channel in 1942).
- 17 October – John Godley, 3rd Baron Kilbracken, author and journalist (died 2006).
- 18 October – Alec Cooke, Baron Cooke of Islandreagh, businessman and politician (died 2007).
- 24 October – Robert Greacen, poet (died 2008).
- 5 November – Tommy Murphy, Laois Gaelic footballer (died 1985).
- 8 November – Charles Mitchel, actor and television newsreader, reader of the first Telefís Éireann news bulletin in 1961 (died 1996).
- 25 November – Patrick Reynolds, Fine Gael party TD and senator, Cathaoirleach of Seanad Éireann 1983–1987 (died 2003).
- 10 December – Michael Russell, Bishop of Waterford and Lismore (1965–1993) (died 2009).
  Full date unknown
  - Emma Groves, blinded by a rubber bullet in 1971, co-founder of the United Campaign Against Plastic Bullets (died 2007).
  - Daniel O'Neill, painter (died 1974).

== Deaths ==
- 24 January – Percy French, civil engineer, songwriter, entertainer and artist (born 1854).
- 3 March – Frank Shawe-Taylor, land agent, murdered (born 1869).
- 20 March – Tomás Mac Curtain, Sinn Féin Lord Mayor of Cork, murdered (born 1884).
- 10 August – James O'Neill, actor, father of the American playwright Eugene O'Neill (born 1847).
- 11 August – Joe Murphy, member of the Irish Republican Army, died on a 76-day hunger strike during the Irish War of Independence (born 1895).
- 17 October – Michael Fitzgerald, Irish Republican Army member, died after a 67-day hunger strike at Cork Jail.
- 25 October – Terence MacSwiney, playwright and poet, member of First Dáil, Sinn Féin Lord Mayor of Cork, died on the 74th day of a hunger strike (born 1879).
- 1 November – Kevin Barry, executed for his part in an Irish Republican Army operation resulting in the deaths of three British soldiers (born 1902).
- 6 November – James Gildea, soldier and philanthropist, founded the Soldiers', Sailors' and Airmen's Families Association (born 1838).
- 9 November – Daniel Gallery, politician in Canada (born 1859).
- 21 November – Dick McKee, Irish Republican Army member in the Easter Rising, shot by Crown forces (born 1893).
- 5 December – T. W. Rolleston, writer, poet and translator, in London (born 1857).
- 14 December – George J. Gaskin, singer, in the United States (born 1863).
- Full date unknown – Denis Grimes, Limerick hurler (born 1864).
