= Campillai =

Chilean surname of indigenous Diaguita origin

Campillai and Campillay is a Chilean surname of indigenous Diaguita origin. Notable people with the surname include:

- Yasna Provoste Campillay, politician
- Fabiola Campillai, victim of police brutality and senator-elect
