= Relatives for Justice =

Support group in Northern Ireland

The Relatives For Justice (RFJ) are a support group formed in the mid-1990s in Dungannon, Northern Ireland. The group are involved with providing support and working with relatives of people bereaved, injured or affected by conflict related violence during The Troubles. The group have offices on the Glen Road in west Belfast and in Dungannnon, County Tyrone and operate satellite sessions from community centres across Northern Ireland.

== Role ==
RFJ help families who are coping with bereavement and injury through conflict related violence and the following trauma. The help provide includes assistance via their therapeutic programme including counselling and complementary therapies, classes, casework support, family support programmes, and drop-in services. Advocacy includes interfacing with investigations and mechanisms established to investigate conflict related harms. RFJ also provide support to individuals accessing reparatory schemes such as those provided by the Victims and Survivors Service.

In 2014–2015 RFJ worked with over 2,700 individuals.

== See also ==
- Emma Groves
- United Campaign Against Plastic Bullets
