= Tear gas =

Chemical weapon

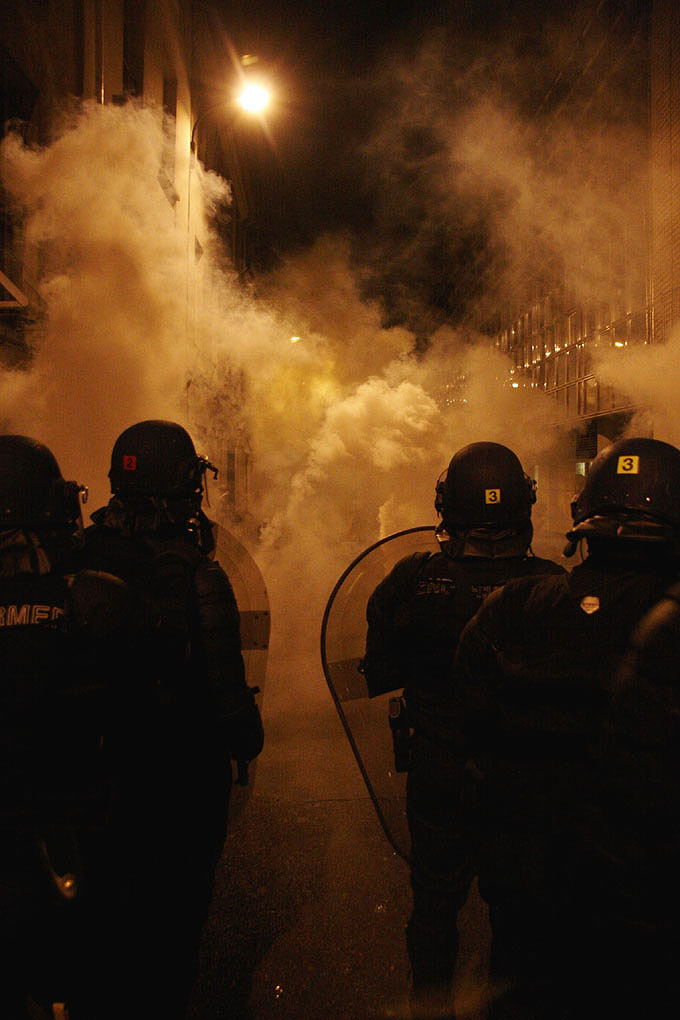
Tear gas in use in France 2007

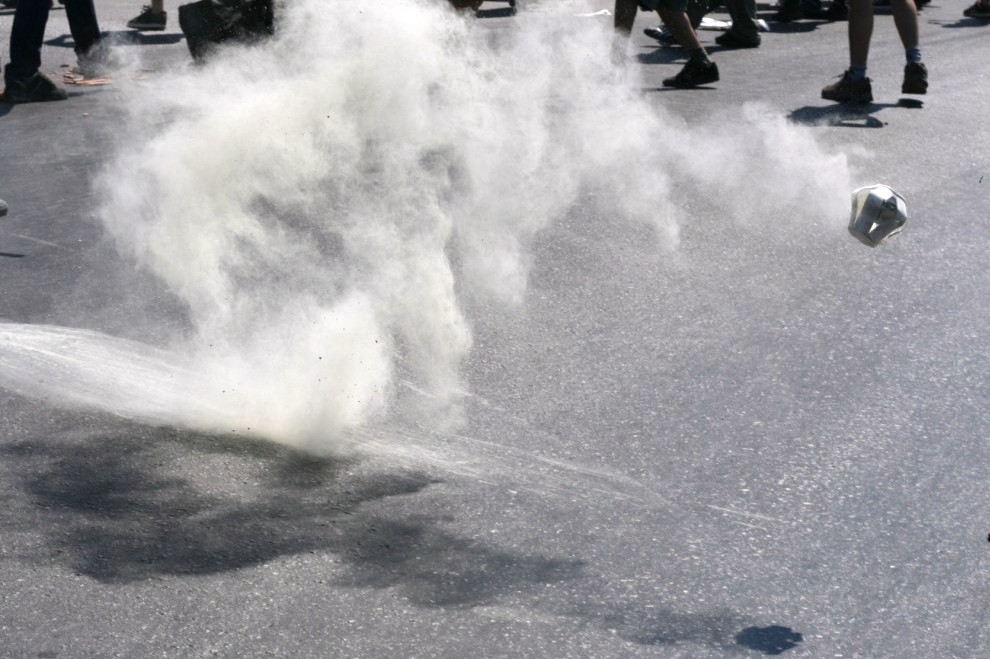
An exploded tear gas canister airborne in Greece

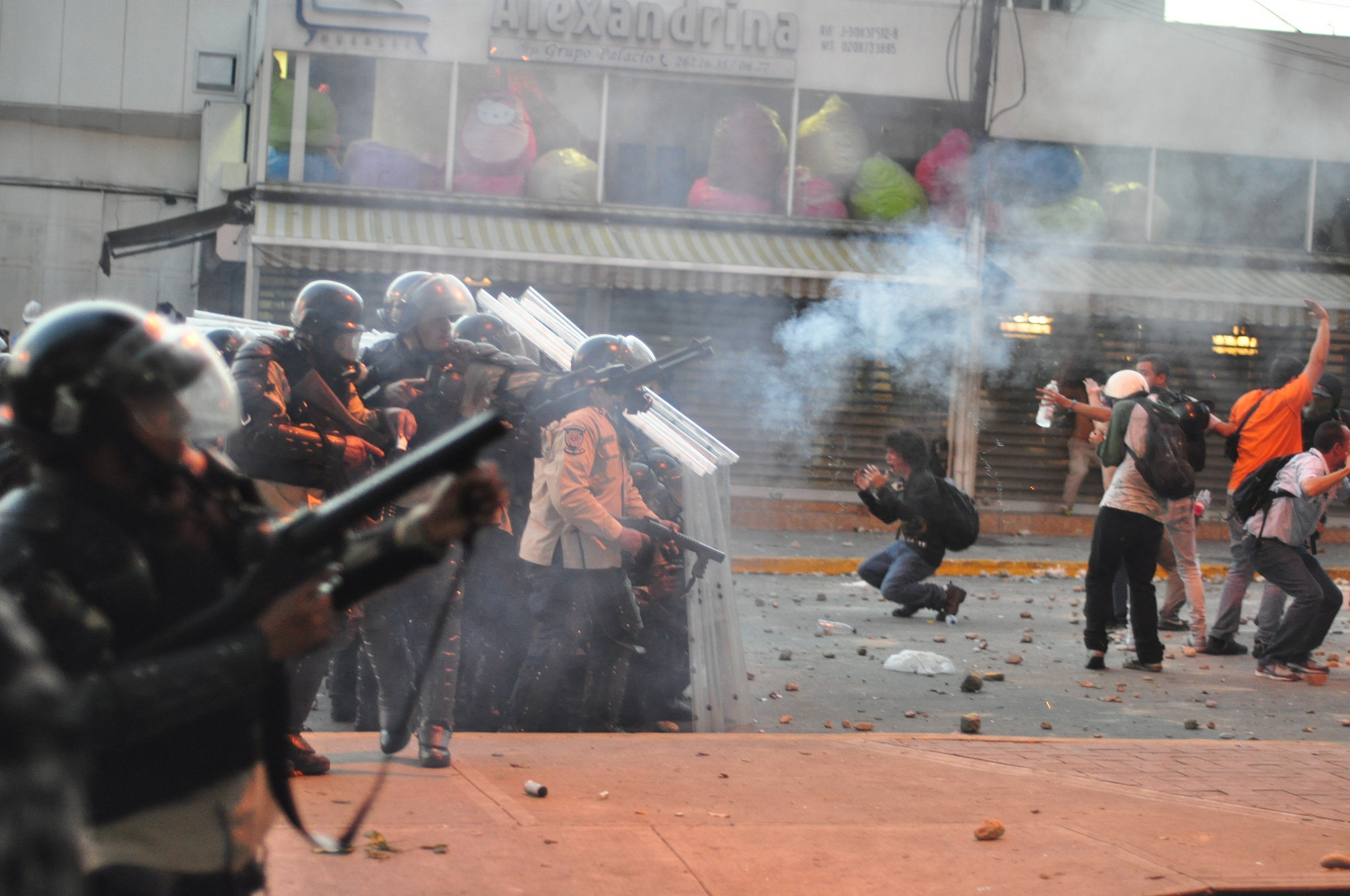
Tear gas used on students in Altamira, Caracas

Tear gas, also known as a lachrymatory agent or lachrymator (from Latin lacrima 'tear'), sometimes colloquially known as "mace" after the early commercial self-defense spray, is a chemical weapon that stimulates the nerves of the lacrimal gland in the eye to produce tears. In addition, it can cause severe eye and respiratory pain, skin irritation, bleeding, and blindness. Common lachrymators both currently and formerly used as tear gas include pepper spray (OC gas), PAVA spray (nonivamide), CS gas, CR gas, CN gas (phenacyl chloride), bromoacetone, xylyl bromide, chloropicrin (PS gas) and Mace (a branded mixture).

While lachrymatory agents are commonly deployed for riot control by law enforcement and military personnel, their use in warfare is prohibited by various international treaties. (Note: E.g. the Geneva Protocol of 1925 prohibited the use of "asphyxiating gas, or any other kind of gas, liquids, substances or similar materials".) During World War I, increasingly toxic and deadly lachrymatory agents were used.

The short and long-term effects of tear gas are not well studied. The published peer-reviewed literature consists of lower quality evidence that do not establish causality. Exposure to tear gas agents may produce numerous short-term and long-term health effects, including development of respiratory illnesses, severe eye injuries and diseases (such as traumatic optic neuropathy, keratitis, glaucoma, and cataracts), dermatitis, damage of cardiovascular and gastrointestinal systems, and death, especially in cases with exposure to high concentrations of tear gas or application of the tear gases in enclosed spaces.

== Effects ==
2-chlorobenzalmalononitrile is the active agent in CS gas.

Tear gas generally consists of aerosolized solid or liquid compounds (bromoacetone or xylyl bromide), not gas. Tear gas works by irritating mucous membranes in the eyes, nose, mouth and lungs. It causes crying, coughing, difficulty breathing, pain in the eyes, and temporary blindness.

With CS gas, symptoms of irritation typically appear after 20 to 60 seconds of exposure and commonly resolve within 30 minutes of leaving the area.

=== Risks ===
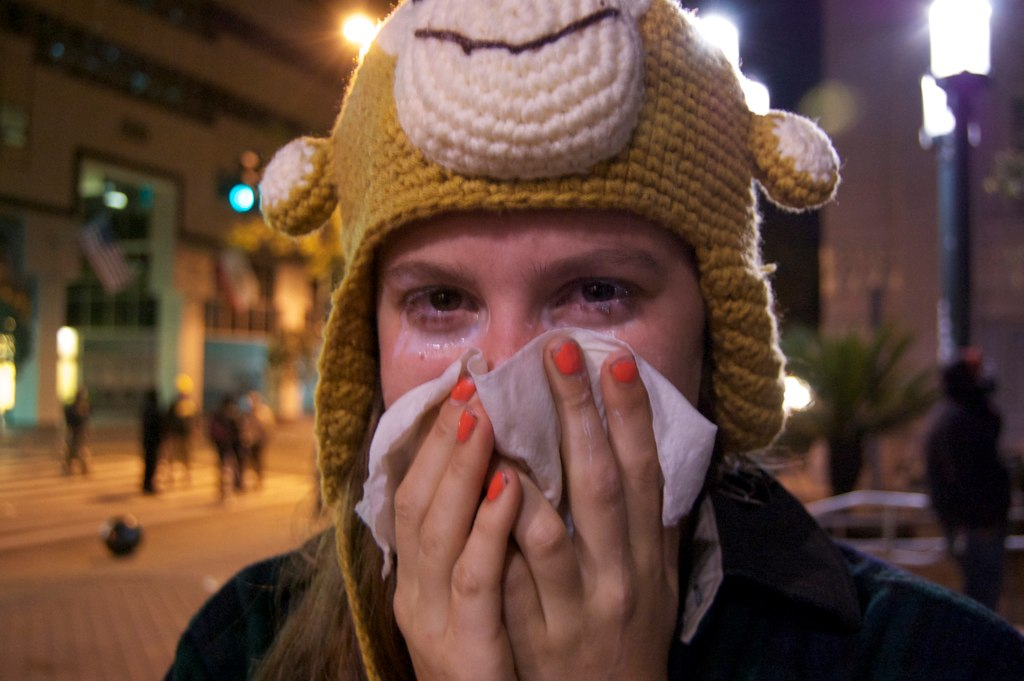
The aftermath of exposure to tear gas during protests in Oakland, California

As with all non-lethal or less-lethal weapons, there is a risk of serious permanent injury or death when tear gas is used. Risks include from being hit by tear gas cartridges that may cause severe bruising, loss of eyesight, or skull fracture, resulting in immediate death. A case of serious vascular injury from tear gas shells occurred in Iran, with high rates of associated nerve injury (44%) and amputation (17%), and instances of head injuries in young people. Novel findings suggest that menstrual changes are one of the most commonly reported health issues in women.

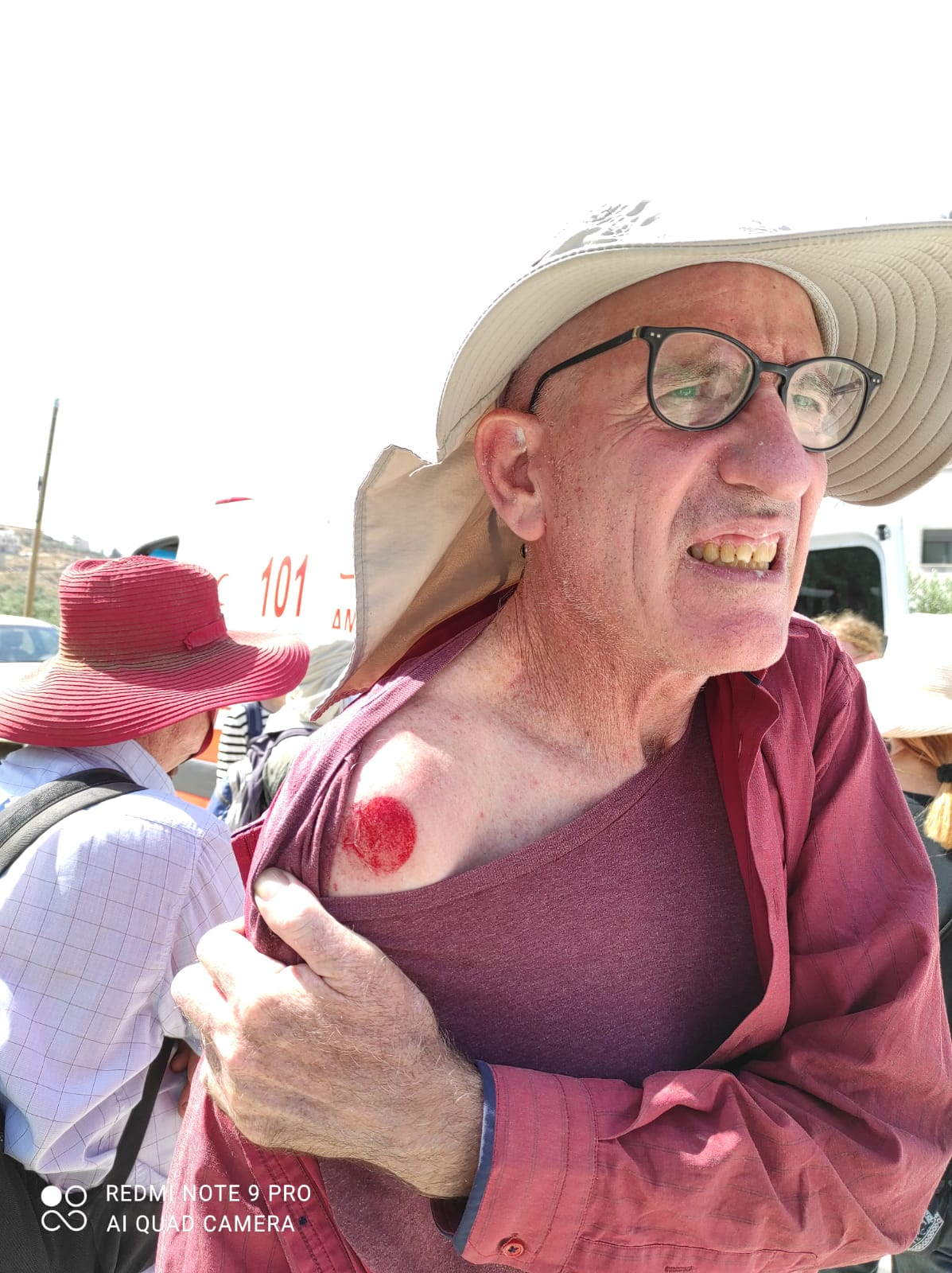
An injury from a direct hit by a tear gas canister

While the medical consequences of the gases are typically limited to minor skin inflammation, delayed complications are also possible. People with pre-existing respiratory conditions such as asthma are particularly at risk. They are likely to need medical attention and may sometimes require hospitalization or even ventilation support.

Skin exposure to CS gas may cause chemical burns or induce allergic contact dermatitis. When people are hit at close range or are severely exposed, eye injuries involving scarring of the cornea can lead to a permanent loss in visual acuity. Frequent or high levels of exposure carry increased risks of respiratory illness.

Venezuelan chemist Mónica Kräuter studied thousands of tear gas canisters fired by Venezuelan authorities since 2014. She concluded that the majority of canisters used the main component CS gas, and that 72% of the tear gas used was expired. She noted that expired tear gas "breaks down into cyanide oxide, phosgenes and nitrogens that are extremely dangerous".

In the 2019–20 Chilean protests, people have had complete and permanent loss of vision in one or both eyes as result of the impact of tear gas grenades.

The majority (2,116; 93.8%) of protestors exposed to tear gas during the 2020 protests in Portland, Oregon, reported physical (2,114; 93.7%) or psychological (1,635; 72.4%) health issues experienced immediately after (2,105; 93.3%) or days following (1,944; 86.1%) the exposure. The majority (1,233; 54.6%) of respondents exposed to tear gas received or planned to seek medical or mental healthcare for their tear gas-related health issues. Health issues associated with exposure to tear gas often require medical attention.

=== Site of action ===
TRPA1 ion channels expressed on nociceptors have been implicated as the site of action for CS gas, CR gas, CN gas (phenacyl chloride), chloropicrin and bromoacetone in rodent models.

== Uses ==
=== Warfare ===
During World War I, forms of tear gas were used in combat and tear gas was the most common form of chemical weapon used. None of the belligerents believed that the use of irritant gases violated the Hague Convention of 1899 which prohibited the use of "poison or poisoned weapons" in warfare. Grenades with the lacrimatory agent ethyl bromoacetate were the first chemical weapon used in World War I. It first was used in August 1914 by the French, whose police had previously used it domestically starting in 1912; followed by the Germans deploying the lung irritant dianisidine chlorosulphonate they called "Nerst Ni-Shrapnel" or "ni-shells" (derived from the word for sneezing powder) against British and Indian troops in October, and the lacrimatory irritant xylyl bromide against the Russians in January of 1915. Alone, these riot control agents' use was small scale and ineffective and over shadowed by the stronger chemical weapons that were introduced later in 1915. Tear gas continued to be used until the end of the war.

Although the French were the first to deploy tear gas in war, an American schoolteacher first proposed using artillery shells filled with chlorine gas in 1862. The US Chemical Warfare Service developed tear gas grenades for use in riot control in 1919.

Use of tear gas in interstate warfare, as with all other chemical weapons, was prohibited by the Geneva Protocol of 1925: it prohibited the use of "asphyxiating gas, or any other kind of gas, liquids, substances or similar materials", a treaty that most states have signed. Police and civilian self-defense use is not banned in the same manner. The United States adopted the protocol under the stipulation that it did not apply to tear gas use in warfare as the agents were nonlethal and used domestically, and did not ratify the protocol until 1975 following controversy over its use in the Vietnam War.

Tear gas was used in combat by Italy in the Second Italo-Ethiopian War, by Japan in the Second Sino-Japanese War, by Iraq in the Iran–Iraq War, by Spain in the Rif War, by the United States in the Vietnam War, and by Israel in the Israel–Palestine conflict.

Tear gas exposure is an element of military training programs, typically as a means of improving trainees' tolerance to tear gas and encouraging confidence in the ability of their issued protective equipment to prevent chemical weapons exposure.

=== Riot control ===
Certain lachrymatory agents, most notably tear gas, are often used by police to force compliance. In some countries (e.g., Finland, Australia, and United States), another common substance is mace. The self-defense weapon form of mace is based on pepper spray which comes in small spray cans. Versions including CS are manufactured for police use. Xylyl bromide, CN and CS are the oldest of these agents. CS gas is the most widely used. CN has the most recorded toxicity.

Typical manufacturer warnings on tear gas cartridges state "Danger: Do not fire directly at person(s). Severe injury or death may result." Tear gas guns do not have a manual setting to adjust the range of fire. The only way to adjust the projectile's range is to aim towards the ground at the correct angle. Incorrect aim will send the capsules away from the targets, causing risk for non-targets instead.

Tear gas fired to disperse protesters outside government headquarters during 2014 Hong Kong Protests in September 2014

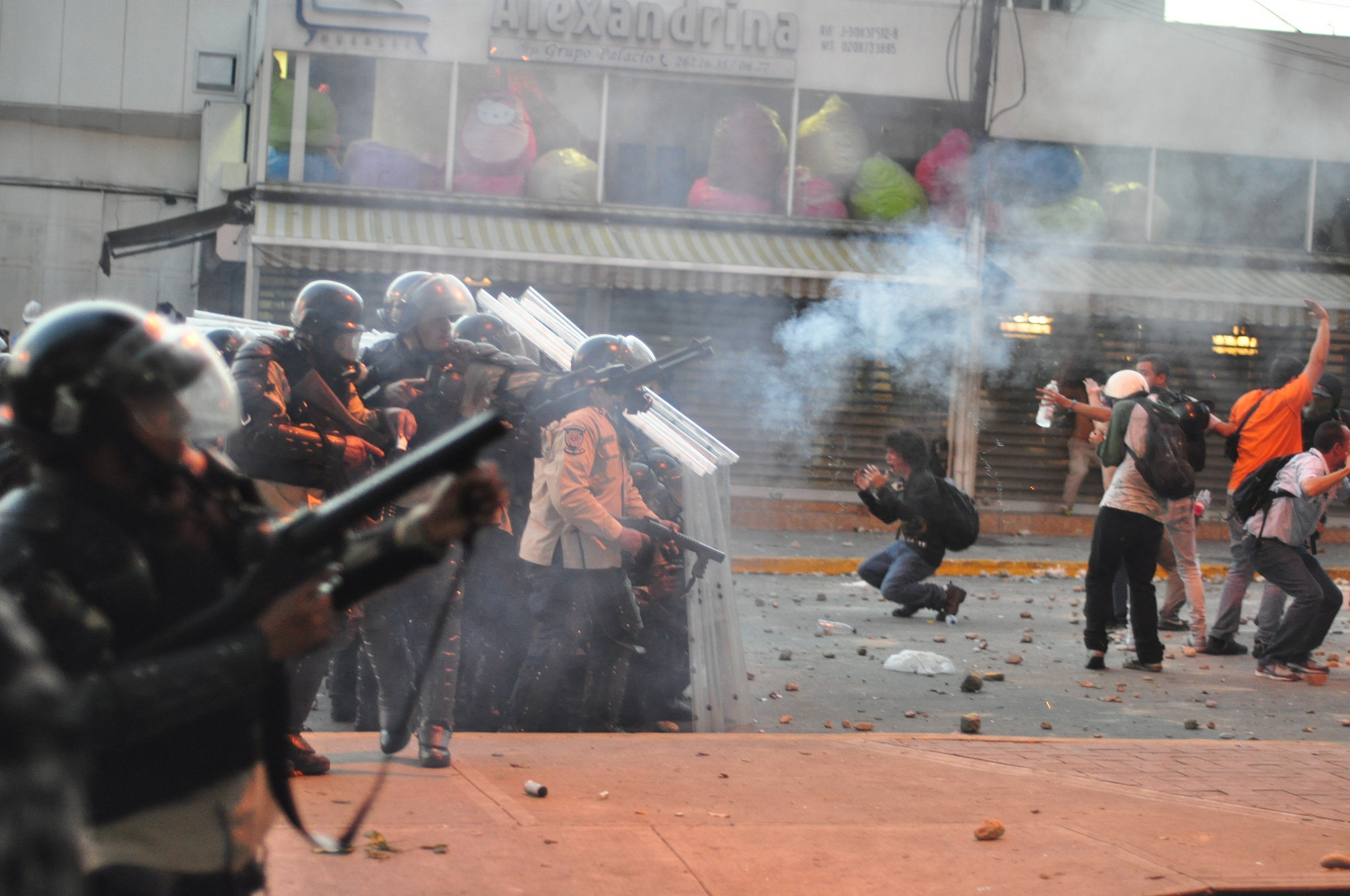
Tear gas being used against opposition protesters during the 2014 Venezuelan protests

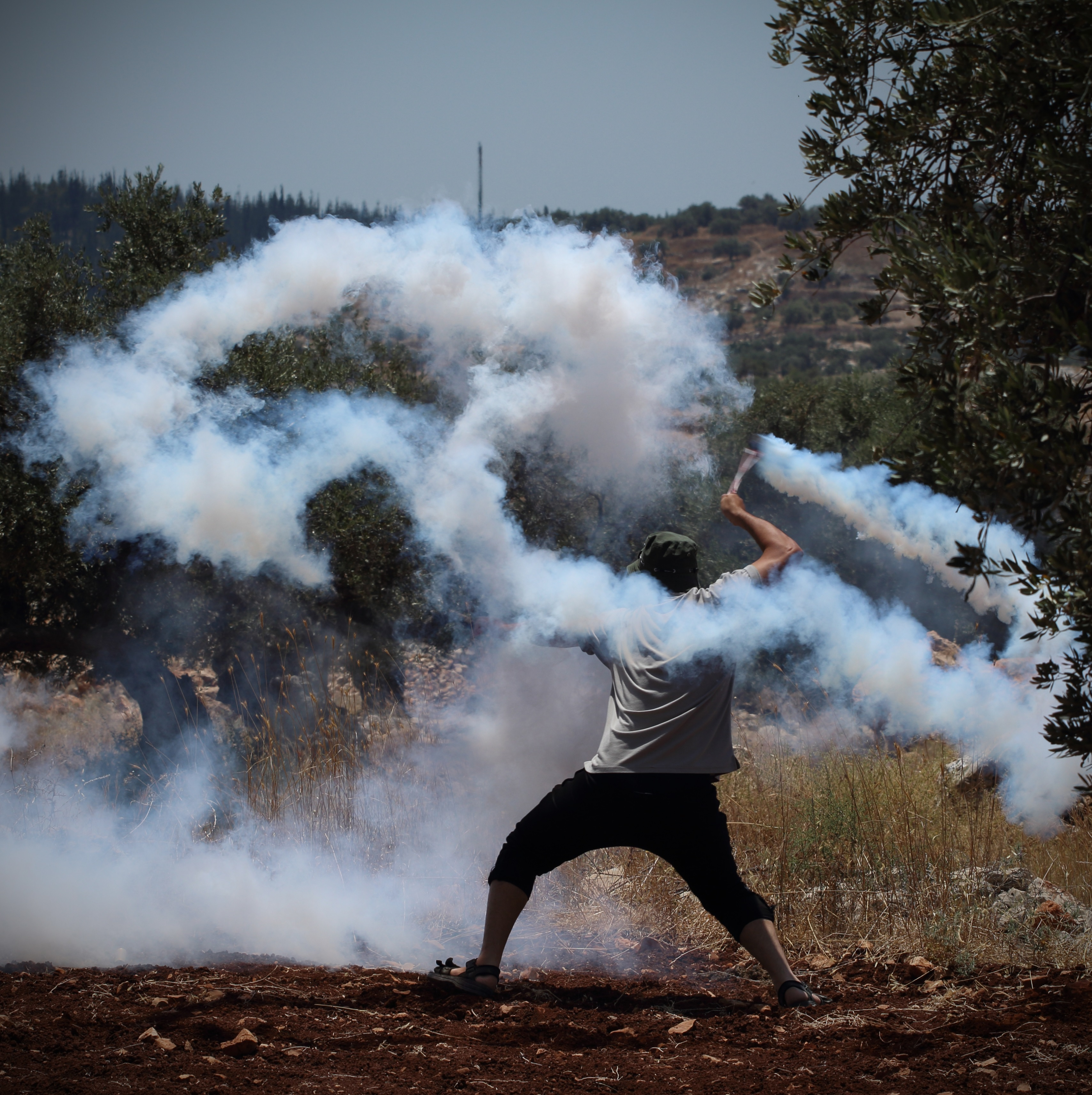
A protester uses a sling to send a tear gas grenade back towards Israeli soldiers during a Palestinian weekly protest in Ni'lin, July 2014.

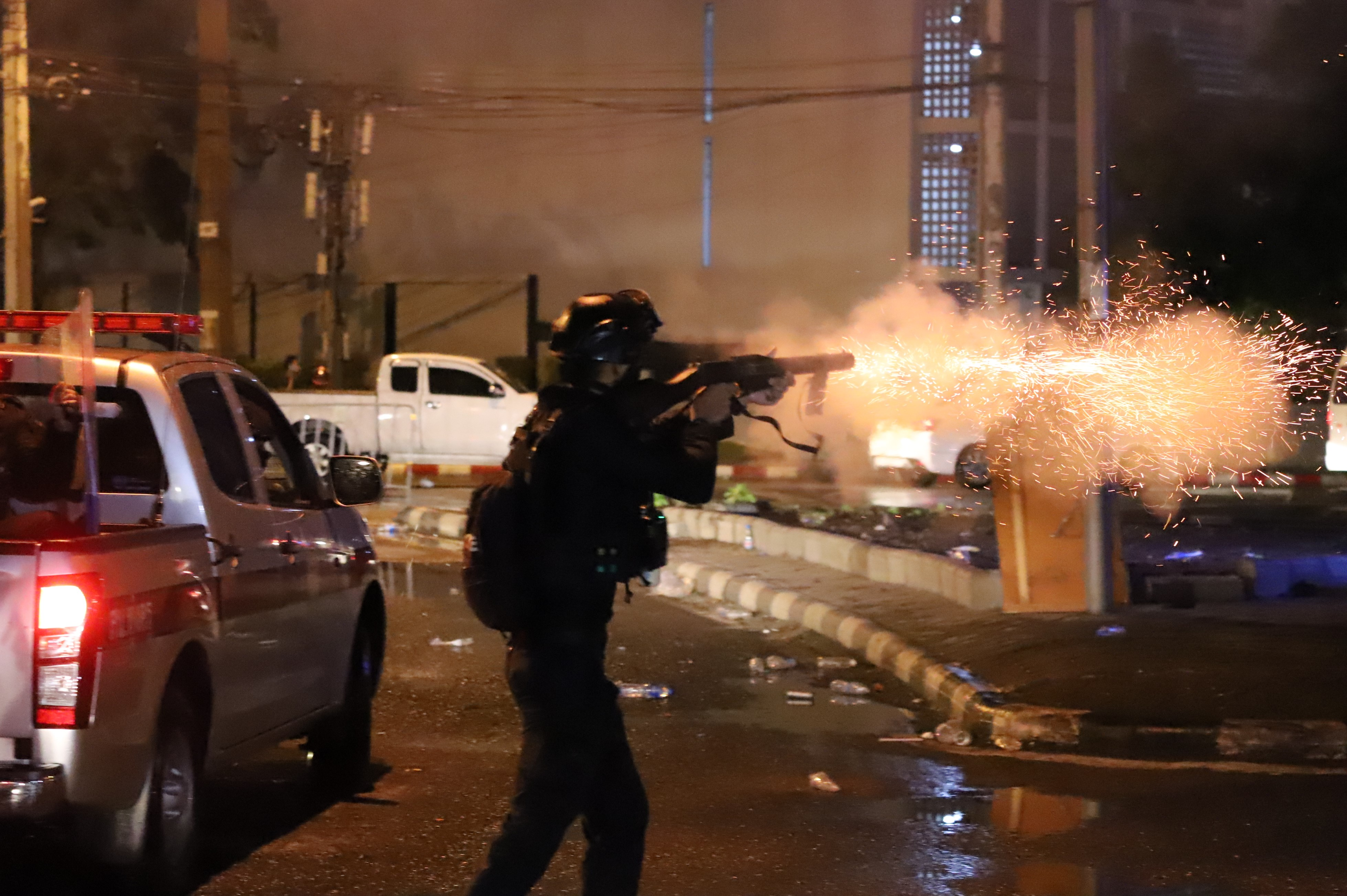
Riot Police fire tear gas to anti-government protesters during Din Daeng Protests in August 2021.

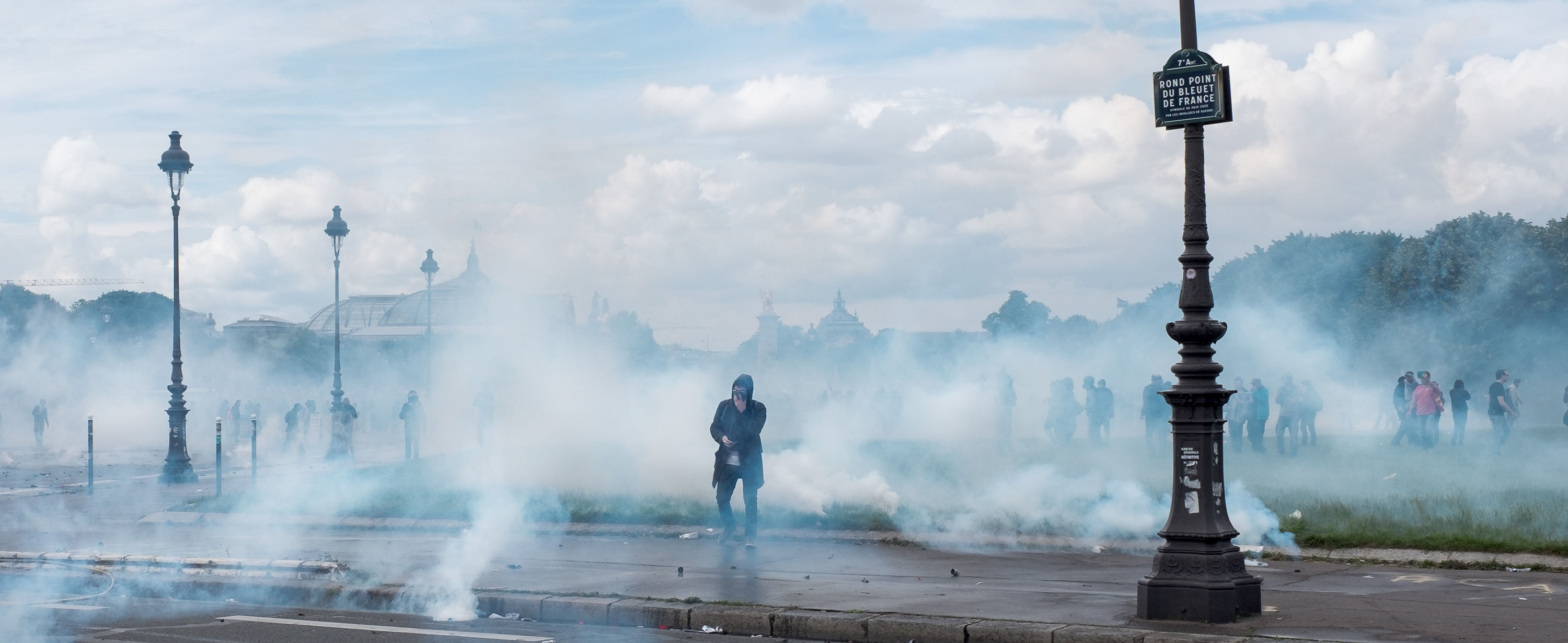
Tear gas during the repression of the protest against the El Khomri law (labour law) in Paris, France, 2016.

Gregory Bovino throws tear gas during Operation Metro Surge, Minneapolis, 2026.

=== Counter-measures ===
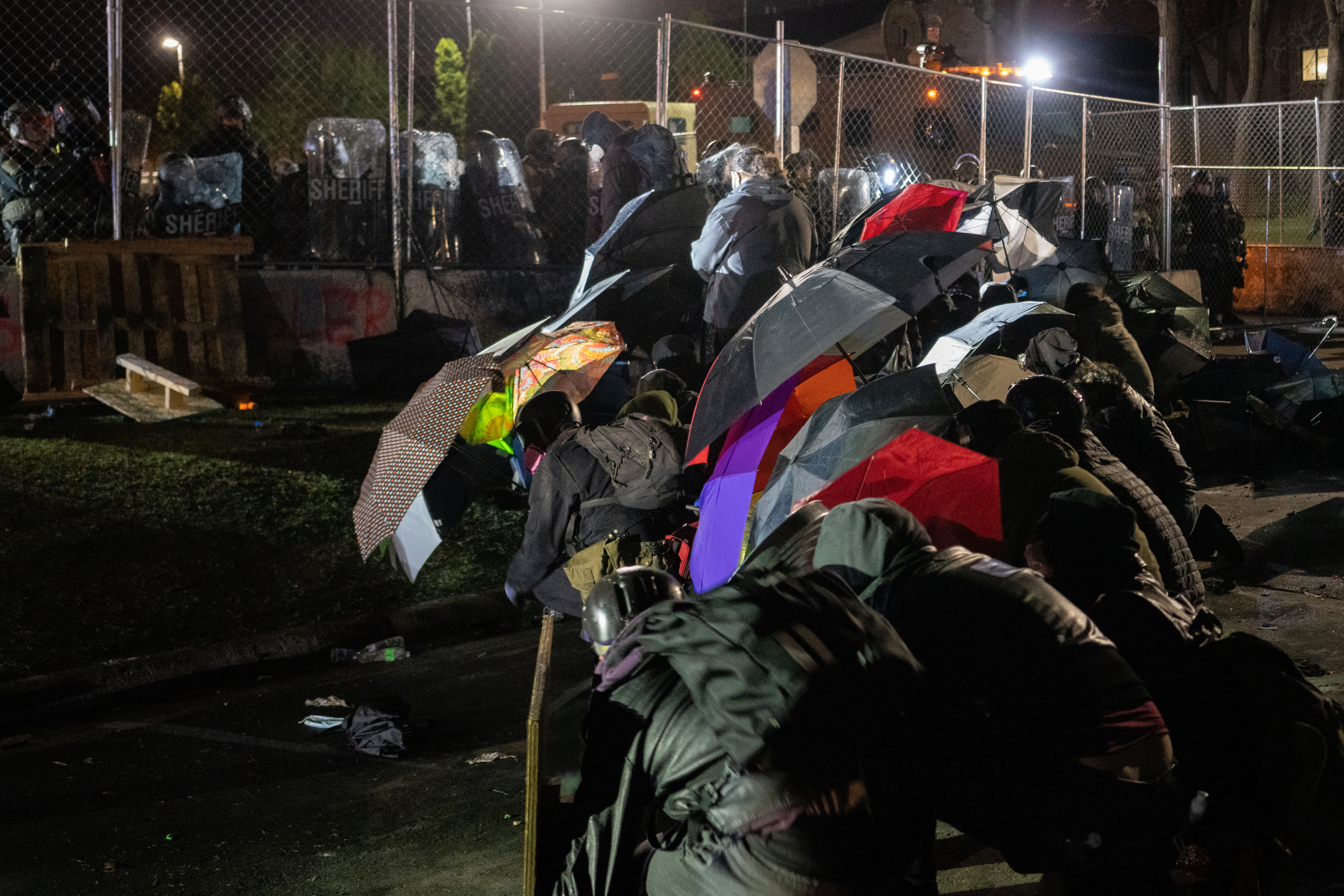
People using umbrellas to defend from tear gas canisters and less-than-lethal munitions

A variety of personal protective equipment may be used, often in conjunction with black bloc tactics, including gas masks and respirators. In riot control situations, protesters sometimes use equipment, aside from simple rags or clothing over the mouth, such as swimming goggles and adapted water bottles, and covering as much skin as possible.

Activists in United States, the Czech Republic, Venezuela and Turkey have used antacid solutions such as Maalox diluted with water to repel effects of tear gas attacks, with Venezuelan chemist Mónica Kräuter recommending the usage of diluted antacids as well as baking soda. There have been reports of these antacids being helpful for tear gas, and for capsaicin-induced skin pain.

==== Traffic cone method ====
- Protestors in Hong Kong using the method to put out tear gas canisters, October 2019
- Protesters at the 2026 Delaney Hall protests using the method to put out tear gas canisters, May 2026

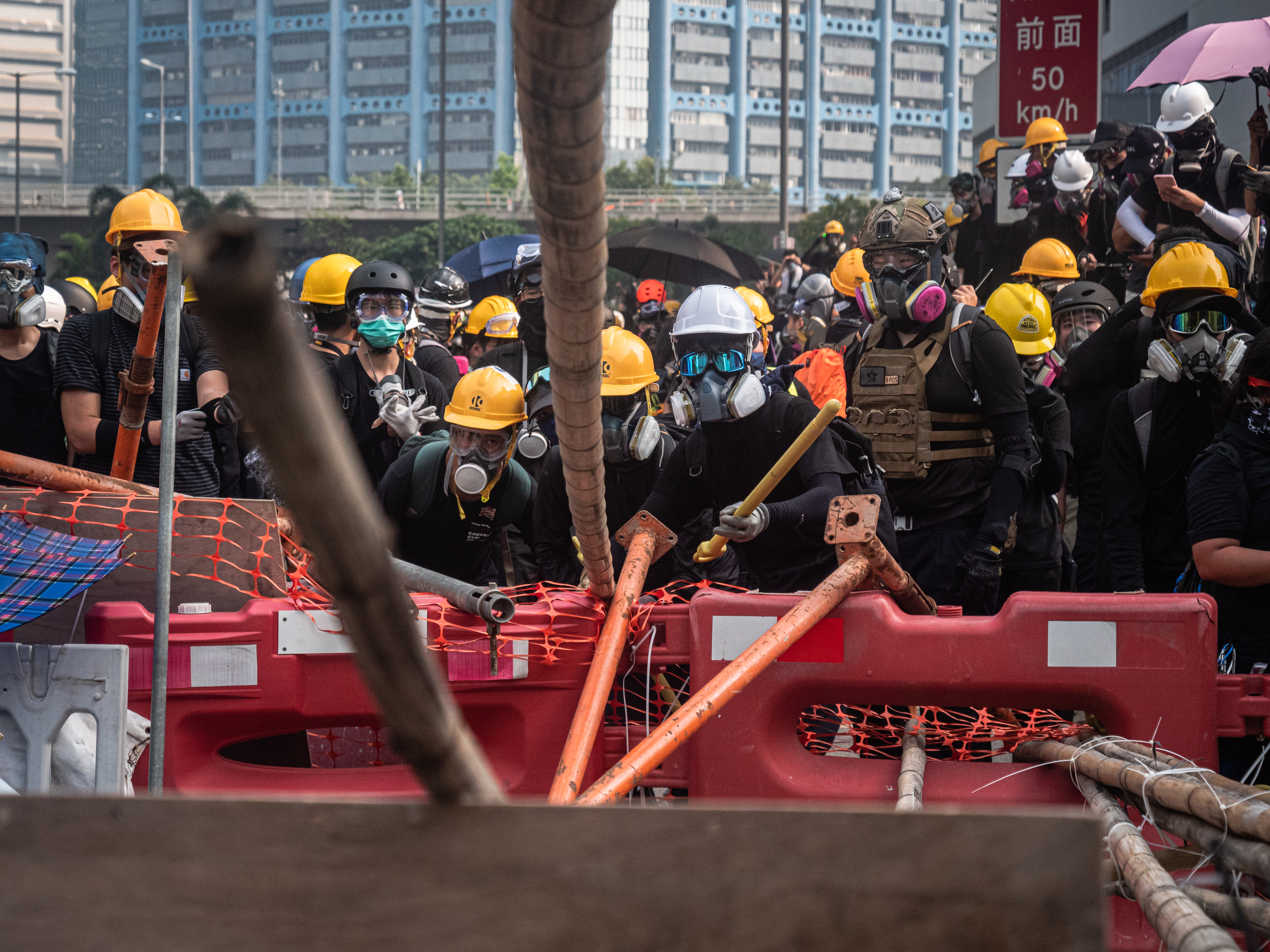
Black bloc Hong Kong protesters wearing personal protective equipment such as gas masks to protect from tear gas while building a barricade, 2019.

In 2019, Hong Kong protesters invented a way of using traffic cones to dispose tear gas when riot police are attempting to disperse a crowd. The method works by placing a traffic cone over the gas canister to trap the gas inside the cone and then by dousing the canister with water through an opening in the top of the cone. The method has been used at protests around the world, including in Chile and the United States, after videos on social media spread of the method being used during the Hong Kong protests.

The use of traffic cones was first documented in 2019 during the 2019–2020 Hong Kong protests, during which frontline protesters became adept at extinguishing tear gas. They formed special "firefighter" teams that sprang into action as soon as a tear gas canister was fired. These individuals generally wore personal protective equipment, including heat-proof gloves, or covered their arms and legs with cling film to prevent the painful skin irritation. Canisters were sometimes picked up and lobbed back at police or extinguished straight away with water or neutralised using objects such as traffic cones.

They shared information about models of 3M respirator filters which had been found to be most effective against tear gas, and where those models could be purchased. Other volunteers carried saline solutions to rinse the eyes of those affected. Specialized individuals sometimes act as tear gas medics, and another group, the "shield-bearers", protected the protesters from the direct physical impact of the grenades.

Dedicated units called "firefighter teams" are assigned to disposing of tear gas, which leaps into action as soon as a canister is fired. The technique requires water to hit the canister inside the traffic cone, meaning it often requires lots of water because it is difficult to aim inside the cone.

After online videos of the strategy spread, the technique became familiar across the world. In 2019-2020, the method was used by Chilean protesters against Primera Línea. In the 2020 George Floyd protests in Portland, Oregon, the traffic cone method was used. The method has also been used in the 2026 Delaney Hall protests.

== Treatment ==
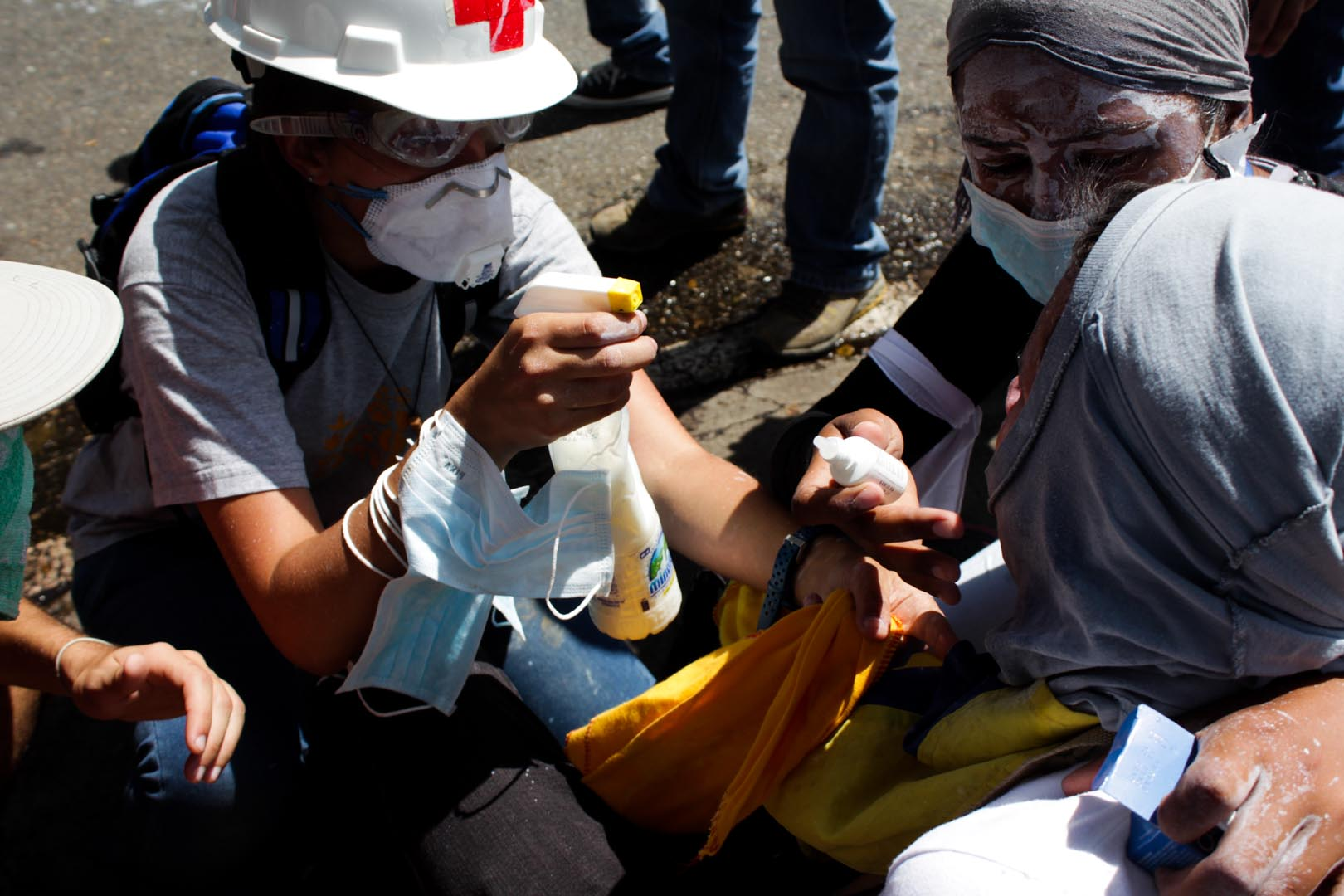
A paramedic tending to an opposition protester during the 2014 Venezuelan protests

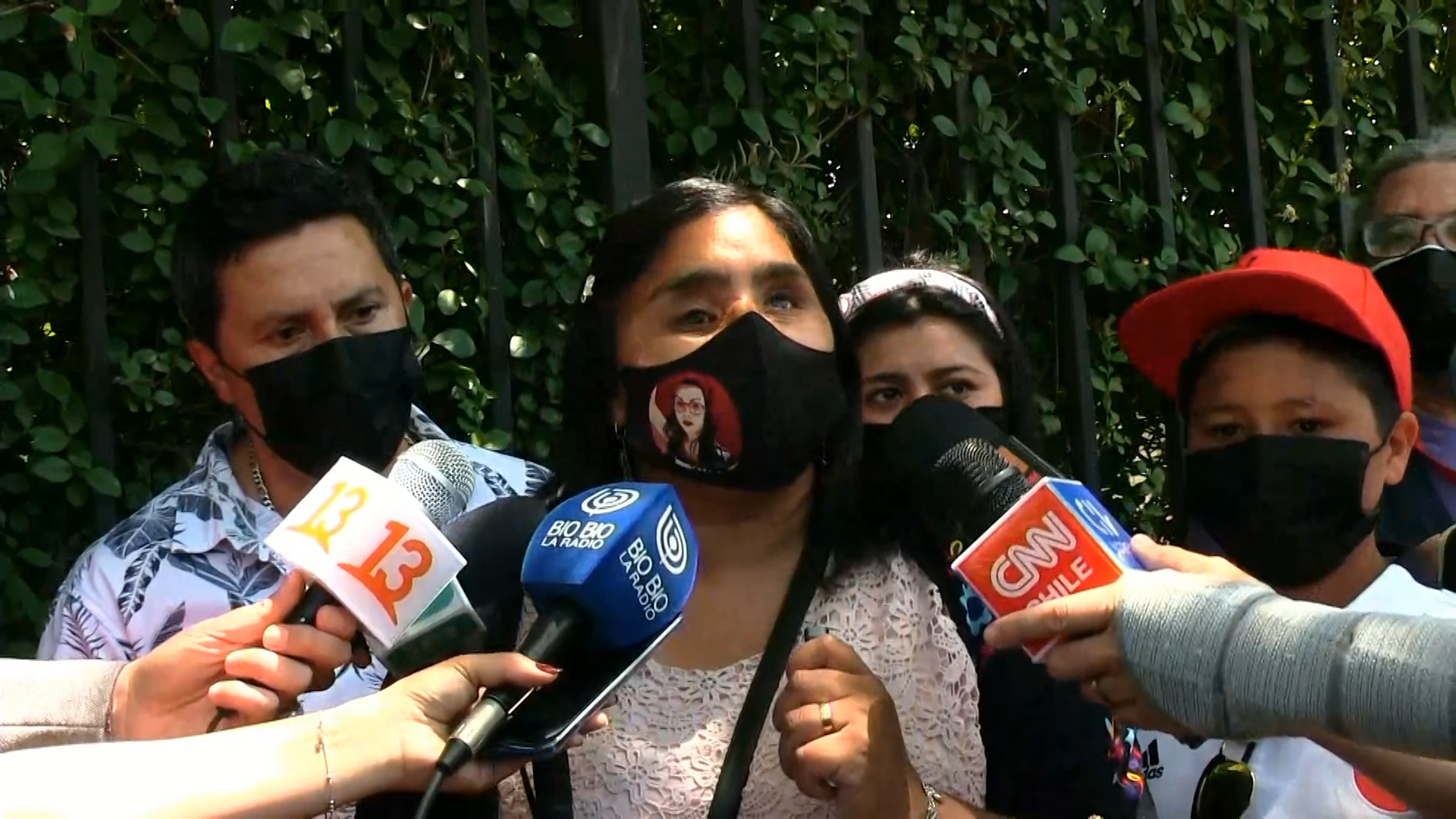
Fabiola Campillai, a Chilean woman left blind in both eyes by a direct hit of a tear-gas grenade in her face

There is no specific antidote to common tear gases. At the first sign of exposure or potential exposure, masks are applied when available. People are removed from the affected area when possible. Immediate removal of contact lenses has also been recommended, as they can retain particles.

Decontamination is by physical or mechanical removal (brushing, washing, rinsing) of solid or liquid agents. Water may transiently exacerbate the pain caused by CS gas and pepper spray but is still effective. Fat-containing oils or soaps may be more effective against pepper spray. Eyes are decontaminated by copious flushing with sterile water or saline or (with OC) open-eye exposure to wind from a fan. Referral to an ophthalmologist is needed if slit-lamp examination shows impaction of solid particles of agent.

Blowing the nose to get rid of the chemicals is recommended, as is avoiding rubbing of the eyes. There are reports that water may increase pain from CS gas, but the balance of limited evidence currently suggests water or saline are the best options. Some evidence suggests that Diphoterine, a hypertonic amphoteric salt solution, a first aid product for chemical splashes, may help with ocular burns or chemicals in the eye.

Bathing and washing the body vigorously with soap and water can remove particles that adhere to the skin. Clothes, shoes and accessories that come into contact with vapors must be washed well, since all untreated particles can remain active for up to a week. Some advocate using fans or hair dryers to evaporate the spray, but this has not been shown to be better than washing out the eyes and it may spread contamination.

Anticholinergics can work like some antihistamines as they reduce lacrymation and decrease salivation, acting as an antisialagogue, and for overall nose discomfort as they are used to treat allergic reactions in the nose (e.g., itching, runny nose, and sneezing).

Oral analgesics may help relieve eye pain.

Most effects resulting from riot-control agents are transient and do not require treatment beyond decontamination. Most patients do not need observation beyond 4 hours. Patients should be instructed to return if they develop effects such as blistering or delayed-onset shortness of breath.

=== Home remedies ===
Vinegar, petroleum jelly, milk and lemon juice solutions have also been used by activists. It is unclear how effective these remedies are. In particular, vinegar can burn the eyes and prolonged inhalation can irritate the airways.

Vegetable oil and vinegar have been reported as helping relieve burning caused by pepper spray. Kräuter suggests the usage of baking soda or toothpaste, stating that they trap the particles emanating from the gas near the airways that are more feasible to inhale. A small trial of baby shampoo for washing out the eyes did not show any benefit.

== See also ==
- Law of war
- Baton (law enforcement)
- Nerve gas
- Rubber bullet
