= Sean Downes =

Irish man shot by a plastic bullet in 1984

John Downes
- Born: Sean Edward Downes; February 1962; Belfast, County Antrim, Northern Ireland
- Died: 12 August 1984 (aged 22); Belfast, County Antrim, Northern Ireland
- Cause of death: Myocardial rupture
- Spouse: Brenda Downes
- Children: 1

Sean Edward "John" Downes (February 1962 – 12 August 1984), was a ex-Provisional Irish Republican Army youth member, who died after he was shot in the chest at point blank range with a plastic bullet in August 1984 during an anti-internment rally in Belfast. Downes was the 15th person killed by a plastic bullet during the Troubles.

== Personal life ==
Sean Edward Downes was born in February 1962 in Belfast, to Gerry and Vera Downes, he was their fifth child.

On 12 March 1979 when Downes was 16 he was arrested and charged for being in a youth wing of the Provisional IRA, but wasn't given any jail time as long as he promised to stay out of trouble. Downes wouldn’t ever rejoin the Provisional IRA.

Downes would marry his long time girlfriend Brenda in January 1983; their marriage was held at the St. Agnes Church. They would have a daughter Claire who was born in February.

== Death ==
On 12 August 1984, John Downes accompanied with his wife Brenda and their 18-month old daughter, Claire attended an anti-internment rally in Andersonstown in front of the Connolly House. Hosted by Sinn Féin president Gerry Adams and NORAID director Martin Galvin.

The RUC arrived to disperse the crowd, but when the RUC attempted to arrest Galvin the crowd began to scatter in the panic. Brenda and Claire left soon after the rioting started, but John stayed; caught on camera Downes was shot by constable Nigel Hegarty in the chest with a plastic bullet at a range of less than 5 meters, Downes would nearly instantly collapse and would die minutes later, as the bullet ruptured his heart.

At least 20 people were injured by the RUC in the assault. A member of the Andersonstown news team, Seán Mac Seaín witnessed much of the violence, he witnessed one man from who was from Dublin who was in his 40s was beaten with batons and stomped on and was knocked unconscious and was badly bleeding, he was followed by a 17-year-old man was also beaten and the back of his head to be split open, then one woman whose leg was injured to the point that she couldn’t walk. Three people, a man in his 50s along with a woman and a child were all beaten with batons. Another woman who had a pacemaker was beaten unconscious, and a young girl who was either 13 or 14 had her foot injured as a bone was snapped and was poking out of her foot. Letitia Fitzpatrick witnessed a woman get her leg ran over by an RUC jeep.

Several press representatives were beaten with batons. Eamon Mallie of Downtown Radio who was taping the incident was beaten and they attempted to confiscate the tape. Brendan Murphy of the Irish News was grabbed by the throat and was demanded to leave. Larry O’Hara a photographer with AP/RN was hit behind the ear by a plastic bullet.

== Inquiry ==
In April 1986 constable Nigel Hegarty in a controversial decision, was found not guilty of manslaughter. Brenda and her solicitor Pat Finucane attempted to overturn but were unsuccessful, partly due to Pat's murder in February 1989.

== Legacy ==
During John Downes’ funeral over 5,000 people attended including Gerry Adams and Martin Galvin.

Shortly after his death protests were organized, due to the killing and the RUC response.

Downes’ death was one of the main reasons for the formation of the United Campaign Against Plastic Bullets, which was founded by Emma Groves and Clara Reilly.

Two separate plaques were installed in memory of Downes near where he died.
