= Eye injuries in the 2019–2020 Chilean protests =

Eye injuries sustained by protestors

The 2019–2020 Chilean protests were characterised by widespread eye injuries, including many globe ruptures ("exploded eyes"), among protesters as result of Chilean riot police's use of rubber bullets and tear gas grenades. Data from the National Institute of Human Rights (INDH) shows that the use of rubber bullets and pellets by security forces has left at least 1,863 injured, including 268 with eye problems. According to the Chilean Ophthalmology Society, this is the highest number of injuries of this type registered during protests or in conflict zones in the world. In late November, security forces announced the suspension of the use of rubber pellets as a crowd control method in the protests. The INDH updated figures at the end of January 2020 reporting that 427 persons had received eye injuries at the hands of the police. Almost 90% of the injured are men. As of early January 2020 the age of injured goes from 14 to 59 years, and averages 28 years.

UTO, the Ocular Trauma Unit (Spanish: Unidad de Trauma Ocular) of Hospital del Salvador has treated the majority of eye injuries. By November 18 it was estimated that nearly 30% of the cases of eye injury that had occurred in the context of the protests involved "exploded eyes", a trauma for which there is no remedy, and results in complete blindness of the affected eye. Monday October 21 is reported by ophthalmologist Mauricio López as one of the days with most eye injuries, that day Hospital Salvador received twenty cases of which ten alone came in the span of a single hour. The high command of the Chilean police ordered an end to the use of supersock cartridges on October 31. Despite this and other initiatives declared by the high command the number of severe eye injuries in November was about the double as in October.

As a result of the COVID-19 pandemic, many of the injured were reported to be unable to continue their treatments for some time. In cases where the injured went to hospital for treatment and supervision, some had to share rooms with COVID-19 patients.

Bandaged eyes had become so common among those who attended protests that they became a symbol for protesters. Among protestors the injured are considered "martyrs" and "proof of police brutality". The eyes bandages featuring in the "A Rapist in Your Path" performances are references to the victims that have experienced eye injuries 2019–2020 Chilean protests. Singer-songwriter Nano Stern released the song Regalé mis ojos (lit. "I gave away my eyes") on November 19 paying homage to Gustavo Gatica, who lost both eyes in the protests. Álex Anwandter covered one of his eyes in homage to the injured during the Olmué Festival in January 2020. Anwandter then added that he hoped that "this time, in difference to the [Pinochet] dictatorship, there will be accountability. And the politically responsible, such as Piñera, will pay." During Mon Laferte's show in the Viña del Mar International Song Festival members of her crew covered their eye in reference to the eye injuries. Fabiola Campillai and Gustavo Gatica, two well-known victims, were part of campaign advertising for the "Approve" option in the 2020 Chilean national plebiscite held on October 25, 2020. Gatica subsequently received a string of offers to run in the 2021 Chilean Constitutional Convention election which he declined. In November 2021 Campillai was elected senator for Santiago Metropolitan Region with 15% of the valid votes in the 2021 Chilean general election, receiving more votes than any other candidate in her district. She celebrated her election in Plaza Baquedano.

The government of Gabriel Boric established grace pensions of 515,672 Chilean pesos for those who sustained an "irreversible ocular trauma" in the context of the protest. The National Institute of Human Rights (INDH) criticized the uncertainty regarding if these pensions are compatible with disability pensions.

Injuries in 2019–2020 Chilean protest
Date	Nov. 30, 2019	Dec. 20, 2019	Jan. 31, 2020
Injured by baton round	1728 (Note: Sum of small bullets ("balín") and pellet ("perdigón"))	1790	1863 (Note: Sum of small bullets ("balín") and pellet ("perdigón"))
Total eye injuries	347	359	427
Complete loss of vision in one or two eyes (Note: Ocular loss plus ocular explosion)	21	23	29

== Causes and responsibilities ==
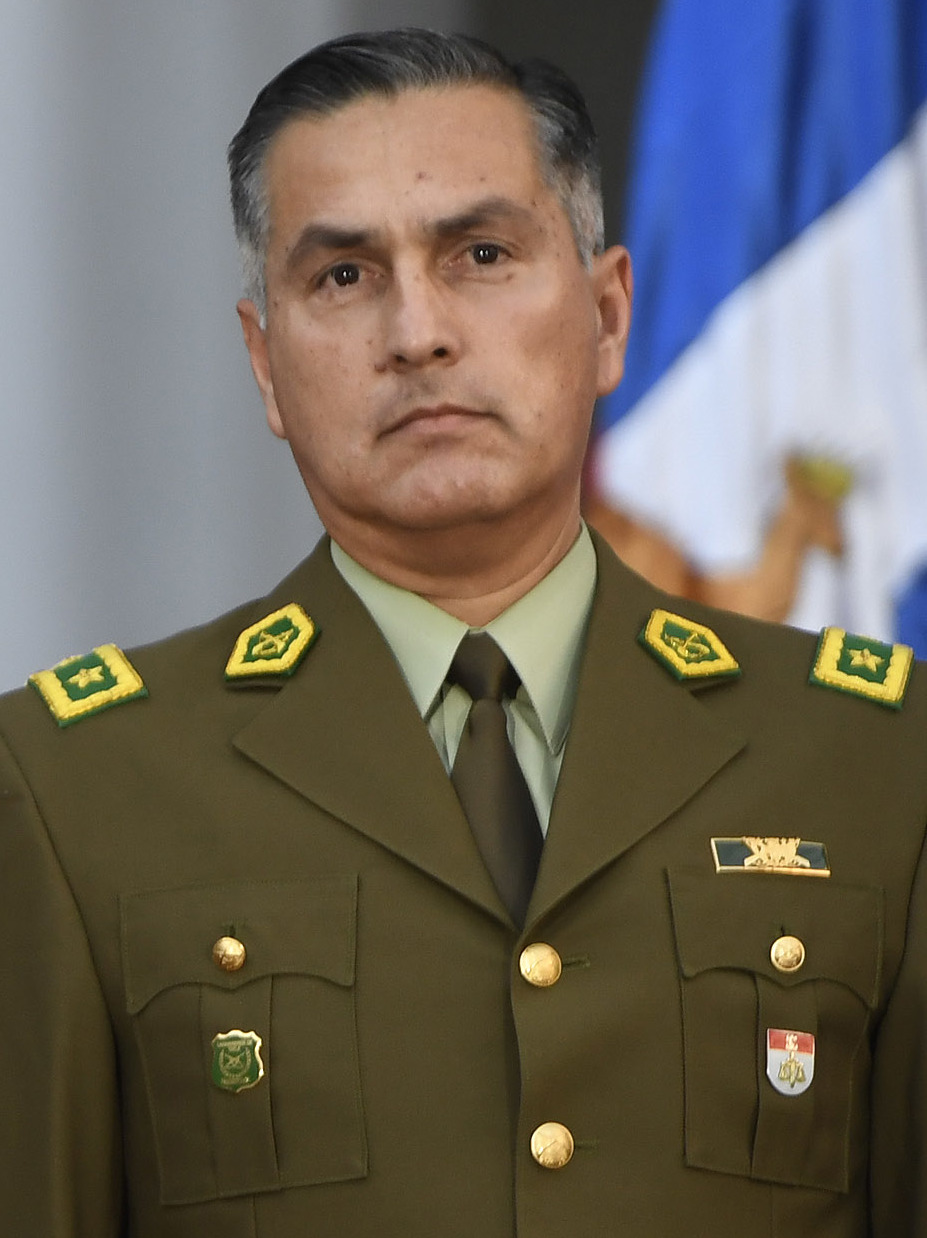
Mario Rozas, Director General of Carabineros de Chile, Chile's main police force and the force in charge of riot control.

Analysis of the composition of the rubber pellets used by Chilean police shows that 80% of the pellets is made up of hard substances such as silica and barium sulfate while rubber makes up 20%. The measured hardness of the rubber pellets is 96.5 shore A. The hardness of the pellets explain why "exploded eyes" are so common. Police sources cited by Ciper indicate the shotgun munitions being of the brand "supersock", containing lead and reaching velocities of 82 m/s.

Between October 18 and late December Chilean riot police shot 152 thousand rubber pellet cartridges of which 104 thousands were fired in the first two weeks of protests. As each cartridge has 12 pellets it means that 1.25 million pellets were fired in the first two weeks.

A survey of 19 people who suffered eye injury shows that 9 of them recall Chilean police aiming directly at their face. The fact that fewer cartridges were fired in November relative to October but that the number of eye injuries doubled from one month to another imply police may have deliberately aimed to injure protesters. An estimate by astrophysicist Nestor Espinoza shows that if the rubber pellets were fired truly randomly against people the number non-eye injuries would be in the order of 750,000.

It has been suggested that contributing factors to excessive police violence are the label of "non-lethal weapon" which would have misled police regarding the harm potential of weaponry, and a lack of respect among the police officers in the field for the authority of Mario Rozas the Director General of Carabineros. (Note: In regards to the eye injuries and other police abuses journalist Mónica Gónzalez denounced on November 11, 2019, that Chilean police was "in fury" and "out of control and without pilot". González claims that part of the reason for this is that the Director General of Carabineros Mario Rozas does not inspire respect nor obedience among lower ranking officials. This disregard for Rozas authority is explained by González by Rozas being an armchair general linked to high-ranking officers investigated for corruption. Chilean police reject these accusations as unsubstantiated.)

A police officer identified in the press as "G-3" (Note: "G-3" had already gained a reputation of aggressiveness by his participation in various violent incidents related to the 2011–2012 Chilean student protests in Valparaíso. In 2012 he was part of a controversial raid against fans of Santiago Wanderers in a Valparaíso bar leading to extensive infrastructure damages.) is accused to have used his rubber-pellet shotgun in an abusive manner against protesters in different times and places in late 2019. "G-3" is investigated for the complete blinding of Gustavo Gatica on November 8. According to Amnesty International it is "unacceptable that the high command of the police tolerated that high ranking officials such as "G-3" made repetitive improper use of their weapons. By not taking measures to impede for this Subprefect ["G-3"] and his subordinates to continue operating outside established protocols and international norms, the high command of the police contributed to one of the most regrettable episodes of recent Chilean history." After an internal police investigation on June "G-3" was fired, for manipulating evidence recorded in his corporal GoPro camera.

=== Political responsibilities ===
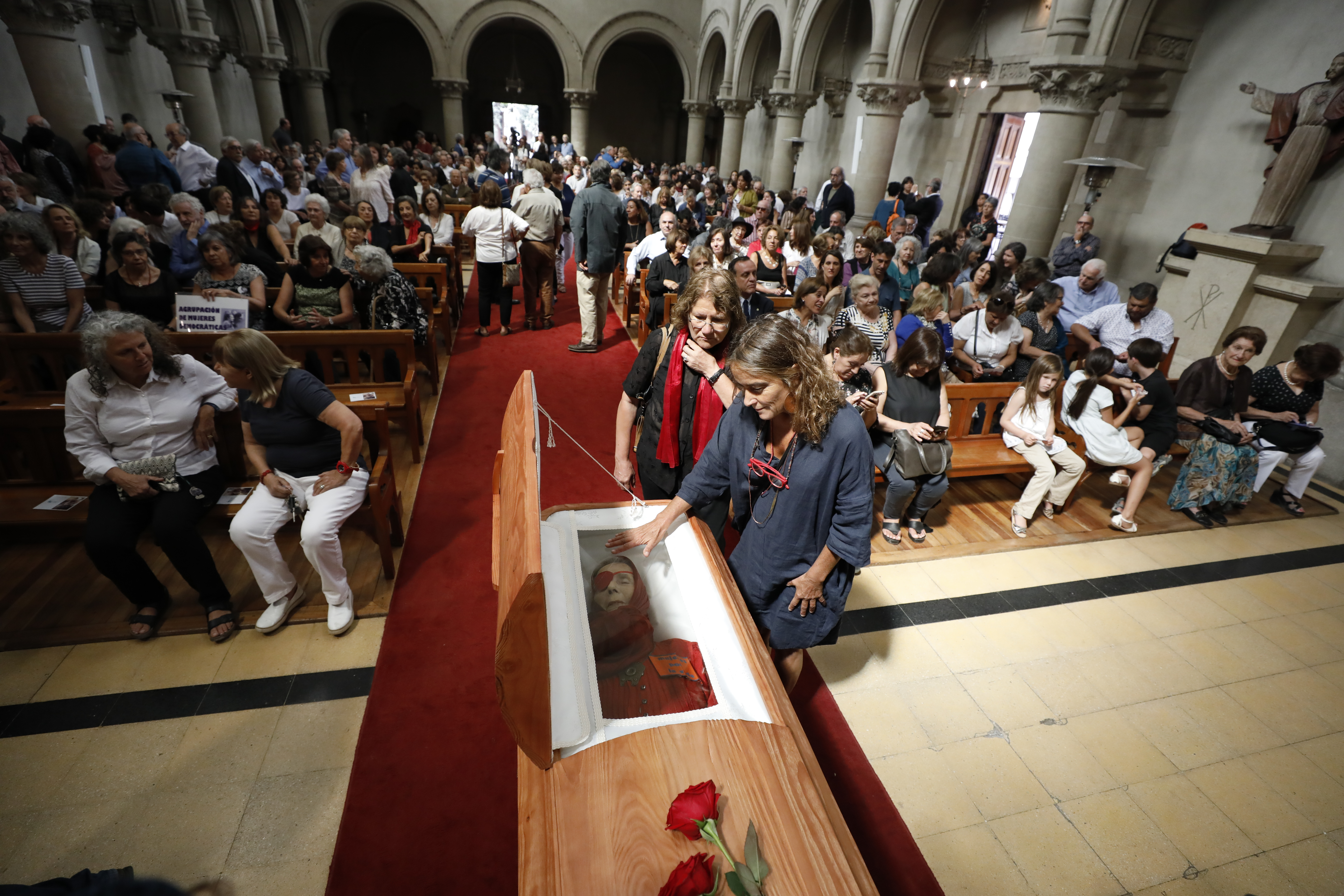
Funeral of journalist Mónica Echeverría in January 2020. Her last wish was to wear an eyepatch in homage to the injurees.

Eye injuries were one of the topics addressed during the impeachment of Minister of the Interior and Public Security Andrés Chadwick in November 2019. On November 20 Ministry of Health Jaime Mañalich declared to the Chamber of Deputies that there was twelve persons with the loss of one eye and about thirty with serious injuries. The President of the Chilean Medical College Izkia Siches made also declaration to the congress regarding eye injuries, expressing her belief that police has not followed the protocols on the use of rubber bullets. On December 11, 2019, the impeachment motion was passed in the Senate effectively barring Chadwick to hold public office for five years. An attempt to launch a similar impeachment process to destitute President Sebastián Piñera was rejected on December 12 as unconstitutional in the Chamber of Deputies.

== Victims with complete loss of vision ==
As of January 31, 2020, INDH counted 29 people who had suffered the complete loss of vision in one or both eyes. Some of these victims are:

- Gustavo Gatica, a 21-year old psychology student from Santiago. Gatica was blinded in both eyes by Carabineros Lieutenant Colonel Claudio Crespo. Gatica was blinded in November 8 and returned to Plaza Baquedano, the focal point of the protest Santiago, on March 11 amidst applauses from protesters.
- A 16-year old from Coquimbo Region. He suffered the complete loss of vision in one eye as result of an occular explosion caused by the impact of shotgun rubber pellets on November 11, 2019. The teenager reports to have taken shelter against tear gas in a bus stop when he leaned out his head to look out for his cousins when he was hit. According to his testimony he was subsequently thrown to the ground by a policeman and had then his head pressed against the ground by the boots of a second policeman. The 16-year old was taken to the Coquimbo Hospital by police and recalls that police officers contradicted his version, claiming that he was hit by a stone. In the same incident, police made comments about raping, hitting and killing him.
- Manuel Véliz, a 21-year old construction worker from Santiago. Before the protests he had been unemployed since September. Véliz recalls that after having participated in the protests the previous week, on Friday November 15 he was returning home after having gone out to search for work. In the afternoon he encountered the protests and was subsequently shot in eye by police at 7:10 p.m. He was taken to hospital in an ambulance together with Fabián, another protester injured in the eye. Véliz stayed in the hospital until November 17.

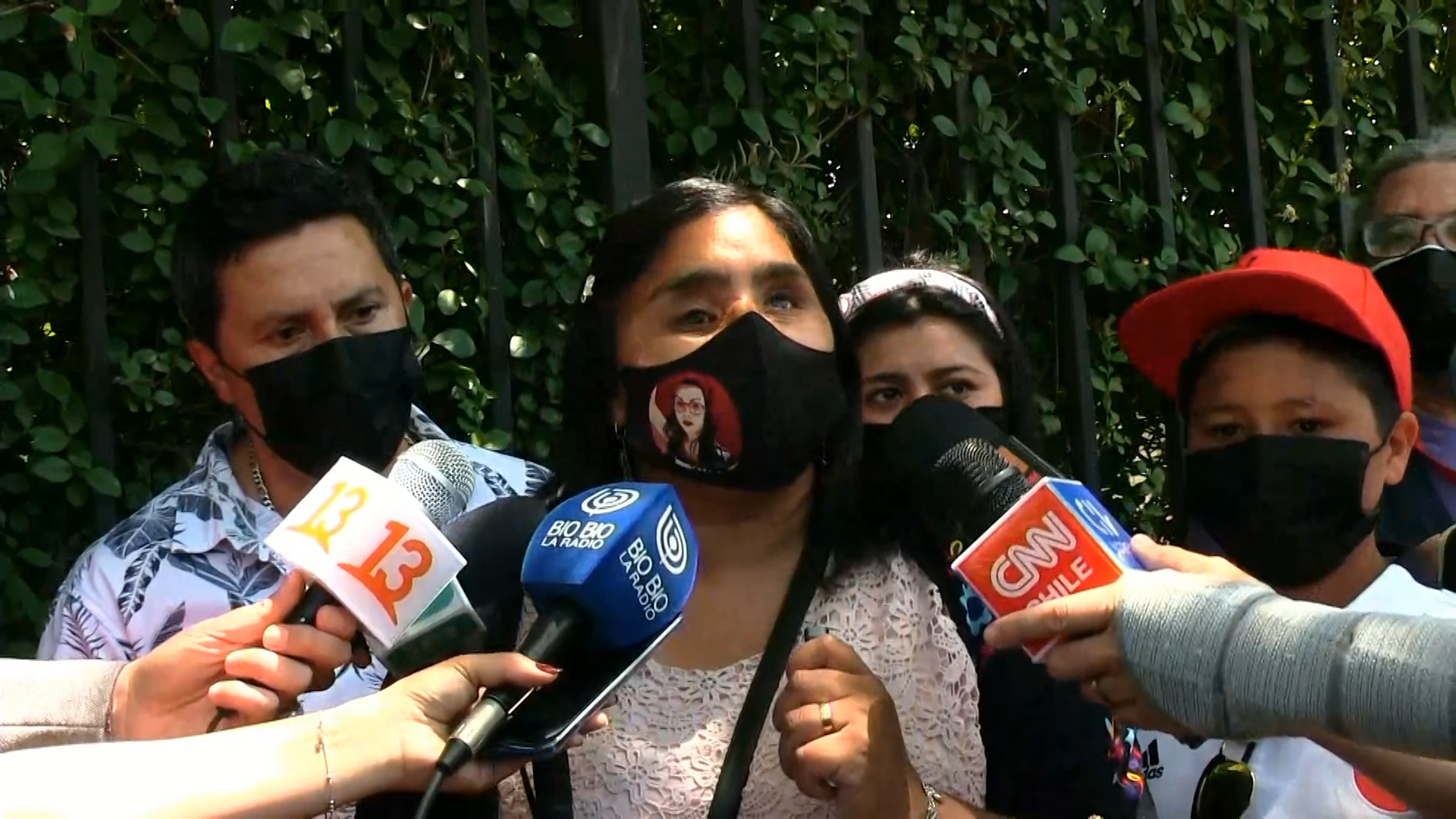
Fabiola Campillai interviewed the day of the 2021 Chilean general election.

- Fabiola Campillai, a 36-year old worker and firefighter. On November 26 she was hit by a tear gas grenade permanently losing the sight in both eyes and the senses of olfaction and taste. Campillai was on her way to her night shift when she was hit by the grenade. She was accompanied by her sister, Ana María, when the incident happened. Ana María immediately confronted the police squad who shot the grenade, but had a grenade shot next to her causing her dress to catch fire. As the police denied Fabiola aid, Ana María shouted for help, to which a neighbor reacted and took Fabiola to a hospital in his car. The next day police showed up outside Ana María's house aiming to bring her to the police station, without showing any valid arrest warrant, which Ana María rejected after consulting with her lawyer. As of June 19, 2020, no suspect had been identified, but then on August 14, 2020, two police officers were fired for their involvement in the case. Both the officer in charge of the squad and the one who shot her have been identified, and the latter, Patricio Maturana Ojeda, brought to justice. The involved officers deny having aimed at her body or noticed that Fabiola had been injured.
- Diego Lastra, medical student. Lastra was celebrating New Year's Eve in Plaza Italia when he was struck by a tear gas grenade. He fell to the ground and was then knocked around by a water cannon blast. Lastra suffered complete loss of vision in his left eye.
- Matías Orellana, a schoolteacher. Orellana was hit by a tear gas grenade in Valparaíso at 4:00 a.m. of January 1, 2020. He was hit while walking in the street with a group of friends while they passed through a zone where there was a police operation in relation to protests taking place. The resulting injuries led to the complete loss of vision in one eye.
- Patricio Pardo Muñoz. Pardo was hit by rubber bullets fired by Carabineros in late October in Viña del Mar. On that occasion he was shot at a short distance and one rubber bullet entered his head through his face. Albeit that bullet did not make him blind it posed a threat since physicians were unable to remove it. Pardo had a new incident on November 27 when he was taking part in a protest in Valparaíso. There, he was hit by a tear gas grenade in his right eye causing the permanent loss of vision in that eye. Pardo was reported to have been depressed as result of his injury and committed suicide in December 2021. He was 26 years old at the time.

== See also ==
- Emma Groves
- Human rights violations in Pinochet's Chile
- Primera Línea
- United Campaign Against Plastic Bullets
- Eye injuries during 2022 Iranian protests
