= Joseph Caprani =

Irish cricketer (1920–2015)

Personal information
- Born: 27 May 1920; Dublin, Ireland
- Died: 16 July 2015 (aged 95); Dublin, Ireland
- Batting: Right-handed

International information
- National side: Ireland

Career statistics
Competition	First-class
Matches	5
Runs scored	95
Batting average	9.5
100s/50s	0/0
Top score	44
Catches/stumpings	5/–
- Source: CricketArchive, 6 December 2022

Joseph Desmond Caprani (27 May 1920 – 16 July 2015) was an Irish cricketer. A right-handed batsman he made his debut for Ireland in June 1948 against Yorkshire and went on to play for them seven times in all, including five first-class matches. His last game was against Scotland in June 1960.

After retiring as a player, he became an umpire, umpiring a match between Ireland and Scotland in 1975. He also served as president of the Irish Cricket Union in 1983.
