= Daniel O'Neill (painter) =

Irish artist (1920–1974)

Daniel O'Neill (1920 – 9 March 1974) was a Romantic painter born in Belfast, Ireland.

== Biography ==
The son of an electrician, and himself an electrician by trade, O'Neill was largely self-taught, although he briefly attended Belfast College of Art life classes, before working with and studying under fellow Belfast artist Sidney Smith. He quickly developed an expressionist technique, and strong romanticism, with imagery, often full of pathos, evoking the themes of love, life and death.

The start of his painting career coincided with the outbreak of World War II and after the 1941 Belfast Blitz he salvaged wood and experimented with wood carving. O'Neill's first exhibition was at the Mol Gallery in Belfast in 1941. In 1949 he visited Paris and was influenced by Georges Rouault, Maurice de Vlaminck and Maurice Utrillo. A number of works followed on which his reputation largely rests, including Place du Tertre (1949), The Blue Skirt (1949), Knockalla Hills, Donegal (1951) and Birth (1952). His later work, largely brighter in colour, was seen by critics as less successful.

In the 1950s, O'Neill moved from Belfast to Conlig, County Down, where there was a small artists' colony that included George Campbell and Gerard Dillon. He lived in London from 1958 to 1971 and his work in this period was increasingly introspective and often desolate. O'Neill returned to Belfast in 1971, where he died in 1974.

During his lifetime, O'Neill's works were primarily exhibited at the Royal Hibernian Academy. Some of his paintings were shown at the Irish Museum of Modern Art as part of a 2005 exhibition of Northern Irish artists.

== Works ==
- Place du Tertre (1949)
- The Blue Skirt (1949)
- Knockalla Hills, Donegal (1951)
- Western Landscape (1951)
- Birth (1952)
- The Artist's Studio
- Belfast after the Riot
- Bride and Groom
- The Clown
- Corn
- Cottages, Connemara
- December in Donegal
- Figure in a Landscape, Donegal
- Figures in a Landscape
- Invented Landscape
- The First Born
- Girl with a Red Bow (sold for €185,000 in 2005)
- Girl with Blossoms
- Girl with Doves
- The Reed Stooks
- Kathleen
- Mountain Road, County Kerry
- The Pearl Necklace
- The Pose
- Studio Interior
- Sunday Afternoon

== Exhibitions ==
- Mol Gallery, Belfast (1941)
- Tooth Galleries, London (1951)
- Tooth Galleries, London (1954) (with Colin Middleton)
- Recent Paintings, McClelland Galleries (1970)
- Royal Hibernian Academy
- Irish Museum of Modern Art (2005)
- Gerard Dillon, Art and Friendships Adams Auctioneers Summer 2013

== Work in collections ==
- Ulster Museum
- Queen's University, Belfast
- Hugh Lane Municipal Gallery of Art, Dublin
- The Taylor Gallery
- Museum of New Zealand Te Papa Tongarewa
