= United Campaign Against Plastic Bullets =

United Campaign Against Plastic Bullets is an organisation based in Belfast, Northern Ireland that opposes the use of plastic bullets by the British army and the Northern Ireland police.

Following the death of John Downes, killed by a plastic bullet fired by members of the Royal Ulster Constabulary in August 1984, the campaign was founded by Clara Reilly and Emma Groves (1920–2007), who had been blinded by a rubber bullet in 1971. After John Downes, two more youths were killed by plastic bullets: Keith White, a 22-year-old from Portadown, in 1986 and Seamus Duffy, aged 15, from Belfast, in 1989.

In March 2005, the Northern Ireland Policing Board agreed to substitute the last variant of the plastic bullet, the L21, for the less-lethal Attenuated Energy Projectile (AEP). The deployment of the AEP is monitored by the Northern Ireland Police Ombudsman.

== See also ==
- Eye injuries in the 2019–2020 Chilean protests
- Relatives for Justice
