= Emma Groves =

Northern Ireland antit-plastic-bullet campaigner

Emma Groves after being shot in the face with a rubber bullet

Emma Groves (1920 – 2 April 2007) was a human rights activist, a leading campaigner for banning the use of plastic bullets, and a co-founder of the United Campaign Against Plastic Bullets in Northern Ireland. She began her campaign after she was blinded from being struck in the face by a rubber bullet in 1971.

== Shooting incident ==
Emma Groves was a Belfast mother of 11 children. At 9 a.m. on 4 November 1971, aged 51, she was standing at her living room window during British Army searches on her neighbours' houses. As a mark of defiance, Emma turned on her record player and placed the ballad "Four Green Fields" on her record player and turned up the volume.

As she turned back to the window, a soldier, at a distance of about eight yards, shot a rubber bullet through the window hitting her in the face. As a result, she lost her sight in both eyes. A doctor at the hospital who was removing Emma's eyes approached Mother Teresa of Calcutta, who was visiting Belfast at the time, to break the news to Emma that her eyesight was gone. Years later, she was offered £35,000 compensation, which was seen at the time as a de facto admission by the Army, although the soldier involved was never charged.

== Campaign to ban plastic bullets ==
Numbers of rubber and plastic bullets fired in Northern Ireland 1970–1981
| Year | Rubber bullets | Plastic bullets |
|---|---|---|
| 1970 | 238 | |
| 1971 | 16,752 | |
| 1972 | 23,363 | |
| 1973 | 12,724 | 42 |
| 1974 | 2,612 | 216 |
| 1975 | 145 | 3,556 |
| 1976 | | 3,464 |
| 1977 | | 1,490 |
| 1978 | | 1,734 |
| 1979 | | 1,271 |
| 1980 | | 1,231 |
| 1981 | | 29,665 |
| Total | 55,834 | 42,669 |
Total rubber and plastic bullets 98,503

Groves campaigned for thirty years for the banning of plastic bullets. Groves and Clara Reilly founded the United Campaign Against Plastic Bullets after the killing of John Downes in August 1984. The aim of the organisation was to bring together the families bereaved or injured by rubber and plastic bullets. They also compiled information on the statistics relating to usage of plastic bullets in Northern Ireland. In 1976, rubber bullets were replaced by plastic bullets. Up until that time they had caused the death of 12-year-old Francis Rowntree and the wounding of a further seventy. The new bullets were solid PVC cylinders, 4 inches (10 cm) long and 1.5 inches (3.8 cm) in diameter. Their weight was nearly 5 ounces (140 g) and they were fired at up to 170 miles per hour (270 km/h). These bullets were presented publicly as a more secure and less dangerous means of crowd control, despite that their use was prohibited in Great Britain as they were deemed 'a danger to the civilian population'. Despite this, Groves said they were used "unsparingly in Northern Ireland". In 1981, during the hunger strikes, large numbers of people took to the streets to show their solidarity with the prisoners. The greatest number of plastic bullets fired was between May and August 1981, the same period in which Bobby Sands and the other nine prisoners died on hunger strike.

It was during those years, that several fatalities and severe injuries occurred from the use of plastic bullets by the British security forces. In October 1976, Brian Stewart, 13 years old, was killed in Belfast by a plastic bullet after being shot by a British soldier during a street riot. Paul Whitters, aged 15, from Derry, died in April 1981 as the result of a bullet to the head fired by an RUC policeman. In Belfast, a 12-year-old, Carol Ann Kelly, was fatally shot on her way home with a plastic bullet after buying milk, in May 1981. It was at this point that Groves decided to do something and to have those "deadly bullets banned". In 1982, she learned that the bullets were manufactured by an American company. So she went to the US along with her daughter and an 18-year-old youth from Derry who had "lost an eye and had his face disfigured". She managed to arrange a meeting in New York with the manager of the company who manufactured them. After their talk she said "the company stopped producing the bullets."

In April 1982, an 11-year-old, Stephen McConomy, died from being shot with a plastic bullet by a soldier from the Royal Anglian Regiment. Commenting on this, Groves said, "When you start killing the children, you inflict the deepest wound of all on a country." With other members of the United Campaign she spoke of her experience at public meetings throughout Ireland. They then decided to take their campaign abroad. They were invited to the Netherlands, Belgium, Norway, Italy, Sweden and Germany. Groves went to the US twice. The campaign then discovered that a Scottish factory, the Bronx Fireworks Company, was manufacturing plastic bullets, and for four years a group from the United Campaign went over to Scotland to picket the factory gates. Later the factory stopped making the bullets. There were, according to Groves, at the time still a number of factories producing the bullets but "the British authorities keep their names secret". The Campaign then began focusing its efforts on a London-based company, Astra Holdings, who it hoped would stop manufacturing the bullets.

John Downes was shot dead during a street disturbance. Groves, in an interview with Silvia Calamati recorded in Belfast in August 1990, said,

"In all these years the only member of the security forces to be brought to trial was Nigel Hegarty, the police officer who killed John Downes. During the course of the trial evidence was presented in the form of photographs and a video showing the sequence of the killing. They were the same images that thousands of people had seen on TV that tragic 12 August 1984 ... Hegarty was acquitted and reinstated in the ranks of the police. Shortly afterwards he was promoted."

Groves concluded her interview by saying, "The victims of plastic bullets are always offered large sums of money as compensation. I have always refused this money as have other family members of the victims. We do not want money. What we do want is justice."

After John Downes, two more youths were killed by plastic bullets: Keith White, a 22-year-old from Portadown (1986) and Seamus Duffy, aged 15, from Belfast (1989).

== Death ==
Emma Groves died from undisclosed causes on 2 April 2007.

== See also ==
- Eye injury in the 2019–2020 Chilean protests
