= Fabiola Campillai =

Chilean activist and politician (born 1983)

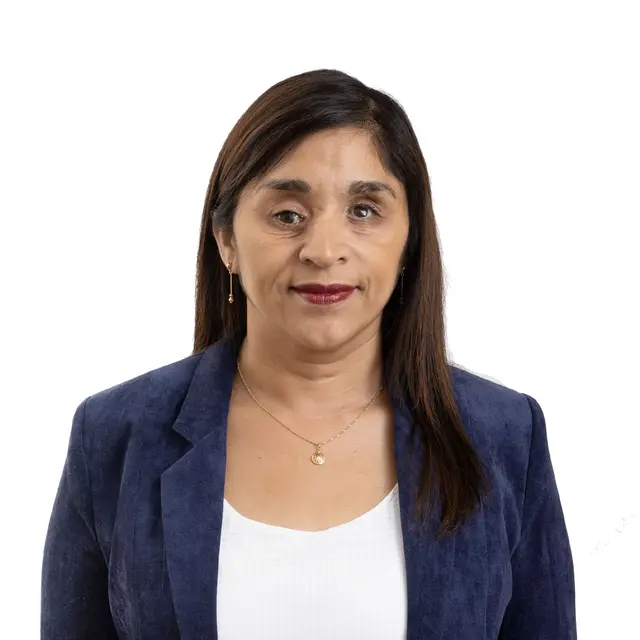

Member of the Senate
- Incumbent
- Assumed office 11 March 2022
- Constituency: Santiago Metropolitan Region

Personal details
- Born: 17 May 1983 (age 43) San Bernardo, Chile
- Spouse: Mario Cornejo
- Children: 3
- Parents: María Rojas; Luis Campillay

Fabiola Andrea Campillai Rojas (born May 17, 1983) is a Chilean Senator known for losing her sight in a case of police brutality in the 2019 Chilean protests.

Before entering politics, Campillai worked in various occupations and was social leader. Since 2022, she has served as an independent member of the Senate of Chile, representing the Metropolitan Region, supported by social movements and victims' groups.

In 2019, she became a national symbol of the victims of police violence during the social protests, after losing her sight and sense of smell and taste when she was struck in the face by a tear-gas canister fired by police while on her way to work.

== Biography ==
She was born on 17 May 1983 in the commune of San Bernardo. She is the daughter of María Rojas García and Luis Campillai Tarifeño. She completed her secondary education at the Fidel Pinochet Le-Brun High School in San Bernardo and at the Liceo Manuel Barros Borgoño in Santiago.

From an early age, she worked in caregiving and in various occupations, such as shop assistant and production operator at the food company Carozzi. An activist and community organiser in the Cinco Pinos neighbourhood of San Bernardo, where she lives, she helped establish the "Neighbourhood Aid Committee" (Comité de Ayuda Vecinal) to address local needs and support the work of the Cinco Pinos Neighbourhood Council. She also served as a firefighter.

She is married to Mario Cornejo González and is the mother of two daughters and one son.

== Police incident ==
She is a former worker and firefighter. On November 26, 2019, she was hit by a tear gas grenade, permanently losing the sight in both eyes and the senses of smell and taste.

Campillai was going to her nighttime work when she was hit by the grenade. She was accompanied by her sister, Ana María, when the incident happened. Ana María immediately confronted the police squad who shot the grenade, but had a grenade shot next to her causing her dress to catch fire.

As the police denied Fabiola aid, Ana María shouted for help to which a neighbour reacted and brought Fabiola to hospital in his car. The next day police showed up outside Ana María's house aiming to bring her to the police station, without showing any valid arrest warrant, which Ana María rejected after consulting with her lawyer.

As of June 19, 2020, no suspect had been identified, but then on August 14, 2020, two police officers were fired for their involvement in the case. Both the officer in charge of the squad and the one who shot her have been identified, and the latter, Patricio Maturana Ojeda, brought to justice. The involved officers deny having aimed at her body or noticed that Fabiola had been injured.

== Political career ==
Campillai and Gustavo Gatica, another well-known victim of police brutality, were part of campaign advertising for the "Approve" option in the 2020 Chilean national plebiscite held on October 25, 2020.

In November 2021 Campillai was elected senator for Santiago Metropolitan Region with 15% of the valid votes in the 2021 Chilean general election, receiving more votes than any other candidate in her district. She celebrated her election in Plaza Baquedano.
