= William Sadler (painter) =

Irish painter

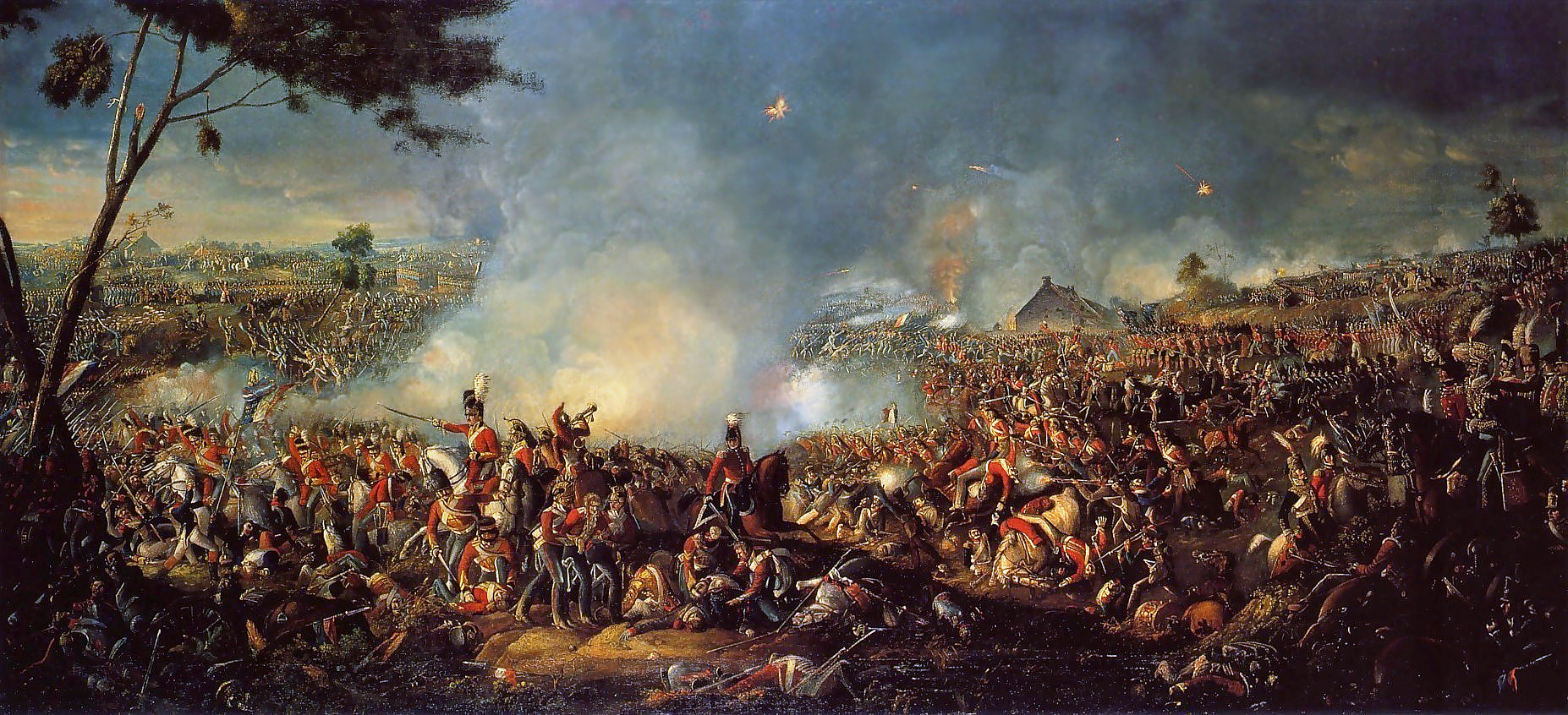
The Battle of Waterloo, Oil on canvas in its original plaster frame, 32 by 69 1/2 inches (81 cm × 177 cm)

William Sadler II (c. 1782 – 1839), also known as William Sadler the Younger, was an Irish painter. He was a noted landscape painter who is known for his depiction of the Battle of Waterloo.

== Life ==
William Sadler II was born around 1782. He was the son of William Sadler, an English portrait painter and engraver who came to Ireland as a boy with his father.

Sadler lived at a number of different addresses before settling in Manders' Building, Ranelagh, where he died on 19 December 1839. With his wife, Caroline, Sadler had a number of children including 2 sons became painters, the eldest being William Sadler III, and Rupert Sadler. William Sadler III emigrated to the United States.

== Career ==
Sadler, who grew up in Dublin, exhibited his paintings between 1809 and 1821 in the city. In 1828 and 1833 he exhibited at the Royal Hibernian Academy. Sadler also taught painting and one of his pupils was James Arthur O'Connor. Sadler was greatly influenced by Dutch genre painting and made many copies of the Old Masters. He mostly painted in oils, with many of his works featuring Dublin's cityscape, crowds, or military scenes painted on mahogany wood panels.

Sadler, his father, and his son, William, all painted in a similar style which has led to some confusion in identifying which Sadler produced some paintings. Though Sadler is generally considered the better of the three artists.

== List of paintings ==
- A View of the Salmon Leap, Leixlip, c. 1810 – Oil on panel; National Gallery of Ireland.
- Donnybrook Fair, c. 1839 – Oil on panel; Collection of Brian P. Burns.
- A View of the Deputy Master's House at the Royal Hospital, Kilmainham, overlooking Phoenix Park
