= Portrait of the Earl of Bellamont =

Painting by Joshua Reynolds

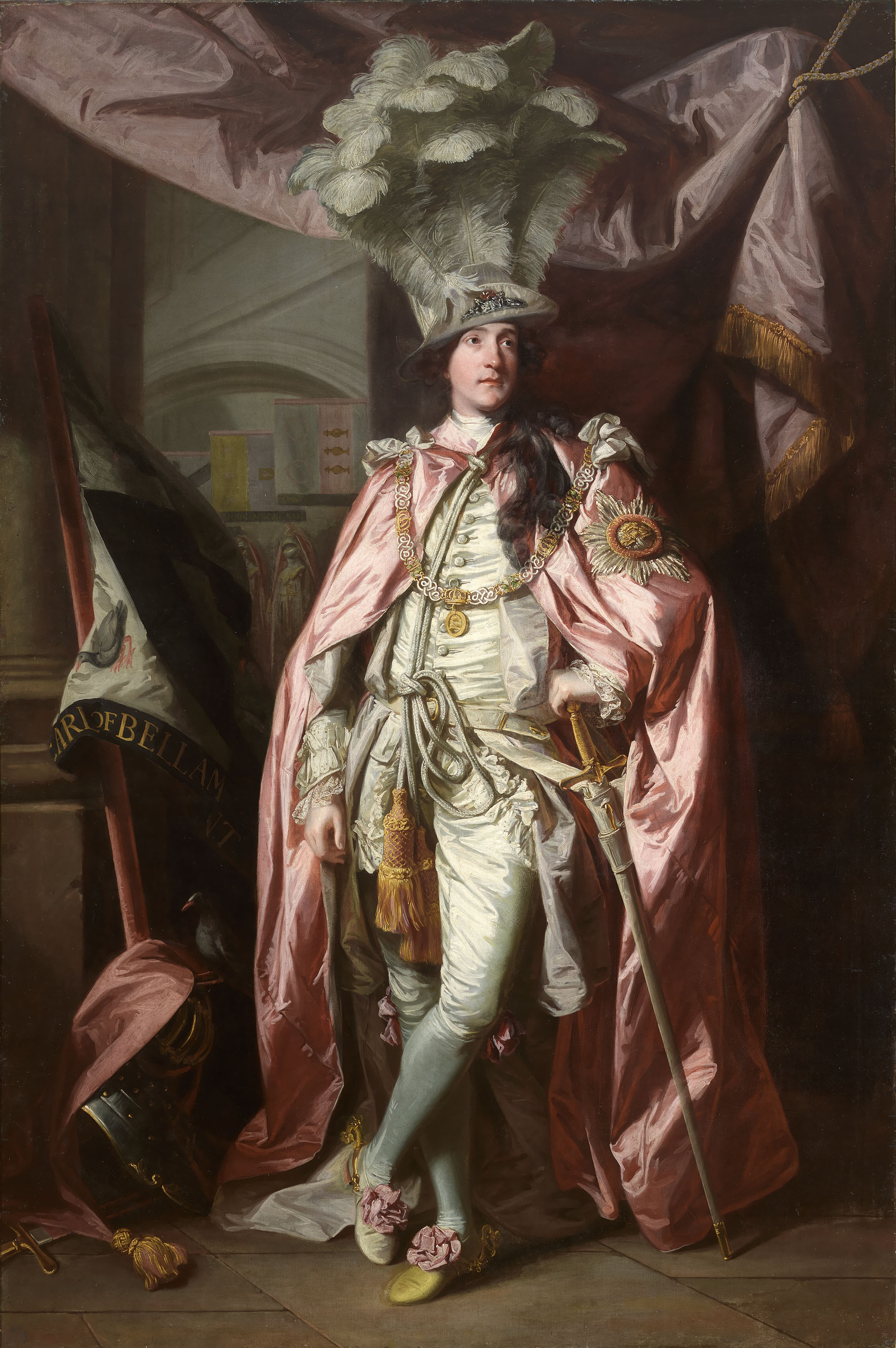
- Artist: Joshua Reynolds
- Year: 1774
- Type: Oil on canvas, portrait painting
- Dimensions: 245 cm × 162 cm (96 in × 64 in)
- Location: National Gallery of Ireland; Dublin

Portrait of the Earl of Bellamont is a 1774 portrait painting by the British artist Joshua Reynolds. It depicts the Irish aristocrat and politician Charles Coote, 1st Earl of Bellomont (his name is often written as Bellamont) He is depicted at full-length in the grand manner style wearing the ceremonial robes and ostrich-plumed hat of the Order of the Bath. Leaning nonchalantly on his sword, it creates the effect of a dandy and echoes the portraits of Anthony van Dyck. This fits with his public persona as a vain womaniser who deserted his wife, the daughter of the Duke of Leinster. Reynolds also adds a punning reference to the sitter's family surname by adding a coot to the background.

The painting was displayed at the Royal Academy Exhibition of 1774 in London's Pall Mall, one of thirteen works he submitted that year. Today it is part of the collection of the National Gallery of Ireland in Dublin, which purchased it in 1875. The same year a mezzotint was produced by the engraver James Scott based on the painting.

== Bibliography ==
- Cullen, Fintan. The Irish Face: Redefining the Irish Portrait. National Portrait Gallery, 2004.
- Hollander, Anne. Fabric of Vision: Dress and Drapery in Painting. Bloomsbury Publishing, 2016.
- Ingamells, John. National Portrait Gallery Mid-Georgian Portraits, 1760-1790. National Portrait Gallery, 2004.
- Litton, Helen (ed.) Master European Paintings from the National Gallery of Ireland: Mantegna to Goya. National Gallery of Ireland, 1992.
- McIntyre, Ian. Joshua Reynolds: The Life and Times of the First President of the Royal Academy. Allen Lane, 2003.
