= James Arthur O'Connor =

Irish painter (1792–1841)

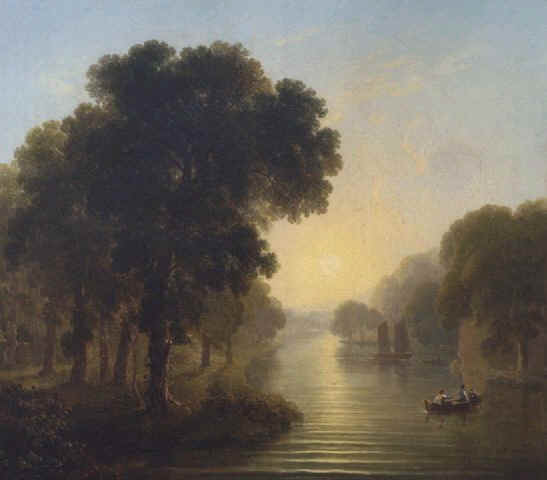
- View on the Shannon, with figures in a rowing boat, 1828.
- Born: James Arthur O'Connor; 1792; Dublin, Ireland
- Died: 7 January 1841 (aged 48–49); Brompton, London, England
- Known for: Painting
- Notable work: Homeward Bound (c. 1825 – 1830); A Thunderstorm: The Frightened Wagoner (1832); The Poachers (1835)

James Arthur O'Connor (1792 – 7 January 1841) was an Irish painter.

== Career ==
James Arthur O'Connor was born 15 Aston's Quay, Dublin – the son of an engraver and printer, William O'Connor. O'Connor would become a distinguished, self taught landscape painter focusing on small but intense landscapes of wild scenery. He received just an art few lessons from William Sadler. In 1813 he travelled to London with Francis Danby and George Petrie. O'Connor exhibited at the Royal Academy in 1822. O'Connor visited France, Belgium, the Netherlands, and the Rhineland. He died poor, in Brompton, London, 7 January 1841. O'Connor was married – his wife's name was Anastatia.

== Gallery ==
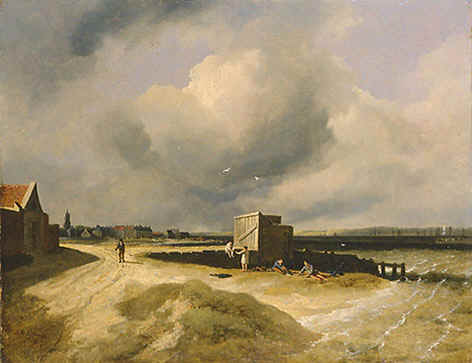
View of Irishtown from Sandymount, 1823, Oil on canvas, 14 x 18 in, 35.5 x 45.7 cm.

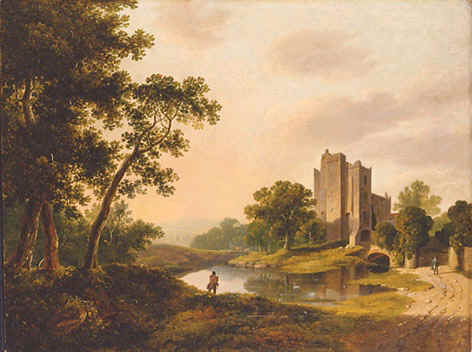
Landscape with a view of Drimnagh Castle, 1821, Oil on canvas, 17½ x 23½ in, 44.4 x 59.7 cm.

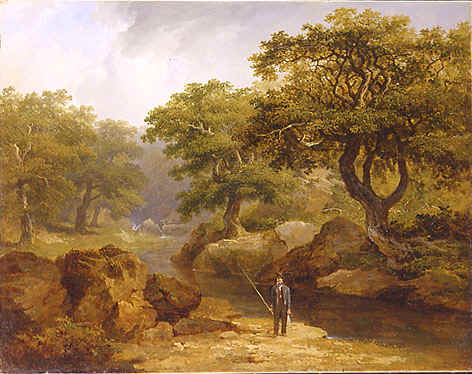
Dargle Landscape with a Fisherman, Oil on canvas, 13½ x 18 in, 34 x 46 cm.

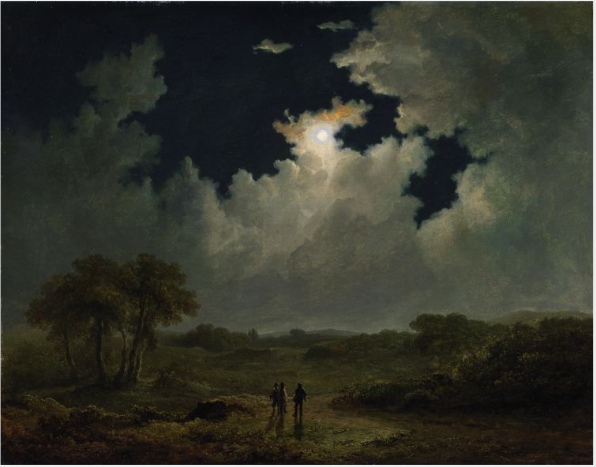
The Poachers, 1835

== List of paintings ==
The list below contains an incomplete list of his works and gives either the owner (in 1985) or the location of where the original is found today (or both).

List of paintings by James Arthur O'Connor
Title	Date	Medium	Dimensions	Repository	Other notes
A Moonlit Landscape		Oil on Board	7 x 6 inches 17.78 x 15.24 cm	David Madden; Blackrock Co Dublin	Signed Lower Right. View at http://www.galleryofthemasters.com/o-folder/oconnor-james-arthur-gallery.html Gallery of the Masters
Westport House	c. 1818	Oil on canvas		Phyllis Pennefather	This is Westport House, in County Mayo.
Ballinrobe House	c. 1818	Oil on canvas	42.0 x 71.0 cm. (16 1/2 x 28 in.)	National Gallery of Ireland	This is said to be Bridge House (then owned by Courtney Kenny), located at Ballinrobe, County Mayo.
Lough Mask	c. 1818	Oil on canvas		National Gallery of Ireland	
A view of Howth Head	c. 1819 – 1820	Oil on canvas		Private Collection	
Landscape with a view of Drimnagh Castle	1821	Oil on canvas	44.4 x 59.7 cm (17½ x 23½ in.)		
View of Irishtown from Sandymount	1823	Oil on canvas	35.5 x 45.7 cm. (14 x 18 in.)	Pyms Gallery, London.	Signed and dated at lower left: 'J A O'Connor 1823'.
The Field of Waterloo	c. 1826			Anglesey Abbey Collection.	This depicts the battlefield at Waterloo, Belgium, a country which O'Connor visited in 1826. The famous Butte du Lion (or Lion's Mound) features prominently in this painting.
A View on the Liffey	1828	Oil on board	22.2 x 28 cm. (8 3/4 x 11 in.)	Private Collection.	Signed and dated: 'J A O'Connor. 1828'.
The Devil's Glen, Co. Wicklow, with a Fisherman	1828			Victoria and Albert Museum, London.	
Homeward Bound	c. 1825–1830	Oil on canvas	63.0 x 76.0 cm. (24 3/4 x 30 in.)	Private collection, sold for charity.	This is one of his nicer paintings and shows an Irishman of the period, accompanied by a small dog, walking down a country lane past a large pair of trees – suggesting he's returning home after a hard day's work. It is signed 'J.A. O'Connor'.
The Ford – A Landscape with Wagon, three Horses, and Figure	c. 1830	Oil on canvas		Frank D. Murnaghan Jr	
The Eagle's Rock, Killarney	1831	Oil on canvas	69.7 x 90.2 cm. (27 1/2 x 35 1/2 in.)	Richard Wood	
A View of the Devil's Glen	c. 1831			National Gallery of Ireland	
A Thunderstorm: The Frightened Wagoner	1832	Oil on canvas	65.0 x 76.0 cm. (25 5/8 x 30 ins.)	National Gallery of Ireland	This is considered to be one of his best paintings. It is signed and dated 'J.A. O'Connor 1832'.
The Poachers	1835	Oil on canvas	55.5 x 70.5 cm. (21 7/8 x 24 3/4 in.)	National Gallery of Ireland	This is his best moonlight painting and one of his best paintings overall. It shows three men (three poachers) standing in a moonlight landscape. It is signed and dated 'J.A. O'Connor 1835'.

== Bibliography ==
- Hutchinson, John. James Arthur O'Connor. Dublin: The National Gallery of Ireland, 1985. ISBN 0-903162-28-8.
