= Jacques Iverny =

French painter

- Known for: Painting

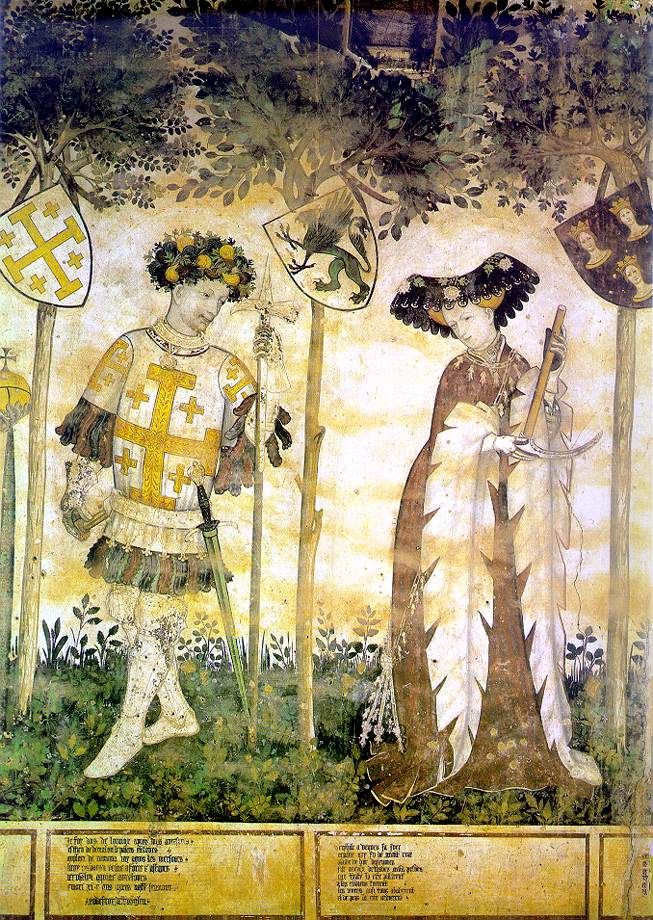
Fragment of the fresco in the Manta castle, often attributed to Iverny

Jacques Iverny, Yverni or Iverni (active 1411–1435, died probably 1438) was a French painter, hailing from Avignon or from central France. He may be the same as the Master of Castello della Manta who is known from a large fresco of heroes and heroines in the Castello della Manta near Saluzzo, Piedmont. He has been attested in Avigno between 1411 and 1413, and between 1426 and 1438.

== Works ==
- Virgin and Child with Saint Stephen and Saint Lucy (triptych), Turin, Sabauda Gallery (signed)
- Annunciation, 151 x 193 cm, National Gallery of Ireland

=== Disputed ===
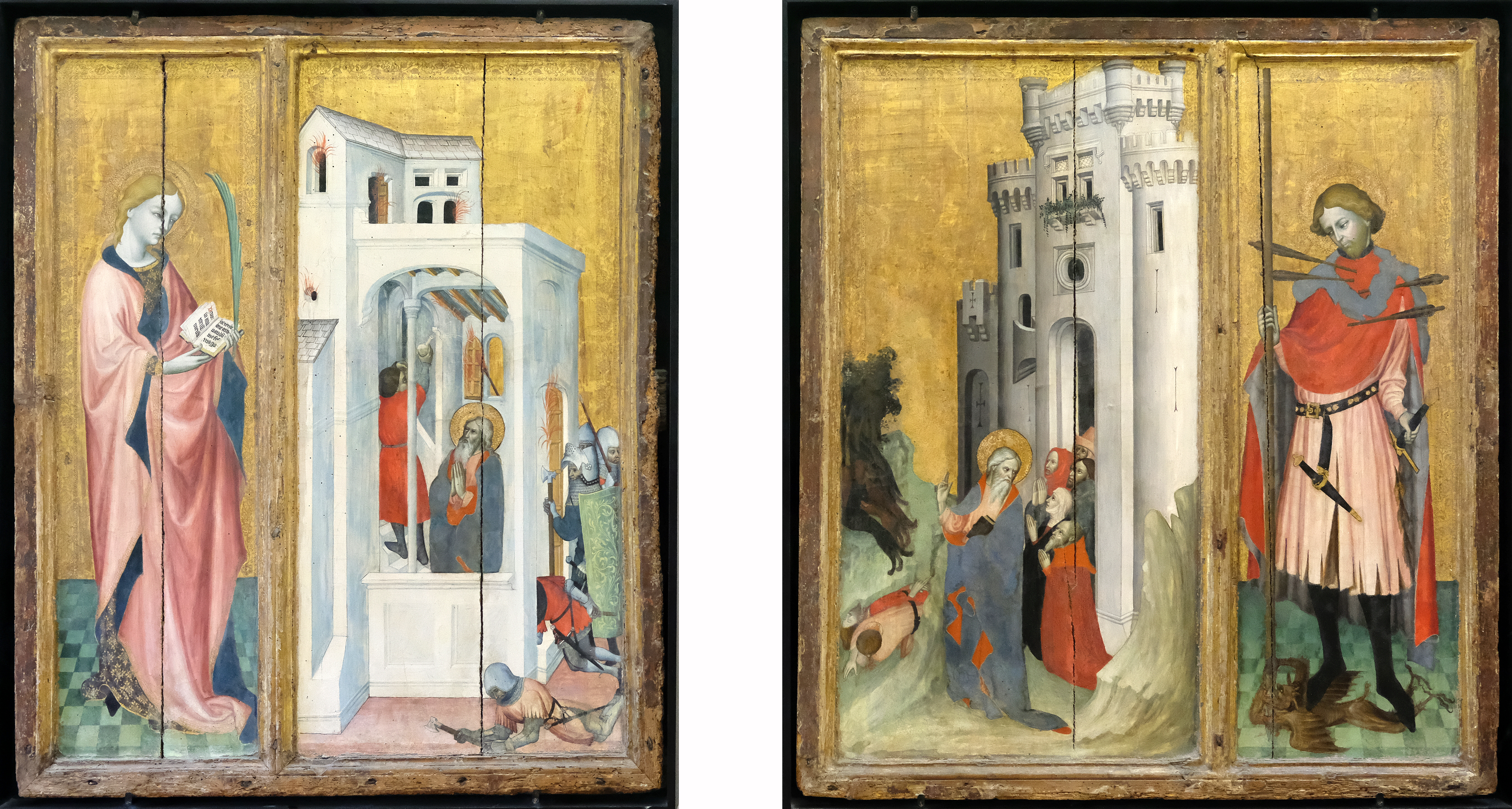
Thouzon retable

- Frescoes in the Castello della Manta
- Thouzon retable, two panels in the Louvre which are according to Eileen Kane in The Burlington Magazine an early work of Iverny (1415 or earlier)
