= Caroline Campbell (museum director) =

International museum curator

- Born: Belfast
- Occupations: Curator, museum director
- Known for: Director of the National Gallery of Ireland

Caroline Campbell (born in Belfast) is an international art museum curator. Since November 2022, she is director of the National Gallery of Ireland, being the first woman taking this position in the Gallery’s 158 year history.

== Early life and education ==
Caroline Campbell was born and raised in Belfast, Northern Ireland. She studied at the University of Oxford for her initial degree, and the Courtauld Institute of Art for her Masters and PhD.

== Career ==
Campbell has held positions in the Ashmolean Museum, the Courtauld Gallery and the National Gallery, London, where she was the director of collections and research.

Among the exhibitions she curated and co-curated are Bellini and the East (2005–2006), Love and Marriage in Renaissance Florence (2009), Building the Picture: Architecture in Italian Renaissance Painting (2014) Duccio/Caro: In Dialogue (2015), and Mantegna and Bellini (2018). She was appointed director of the National Gallery of Ireland in 2022, succeeding Sean Rainbird, who had served as director since 2012.
