= The Battle of Waterloo (painting, Sadler II) =

Painting by William Sadler (painter)

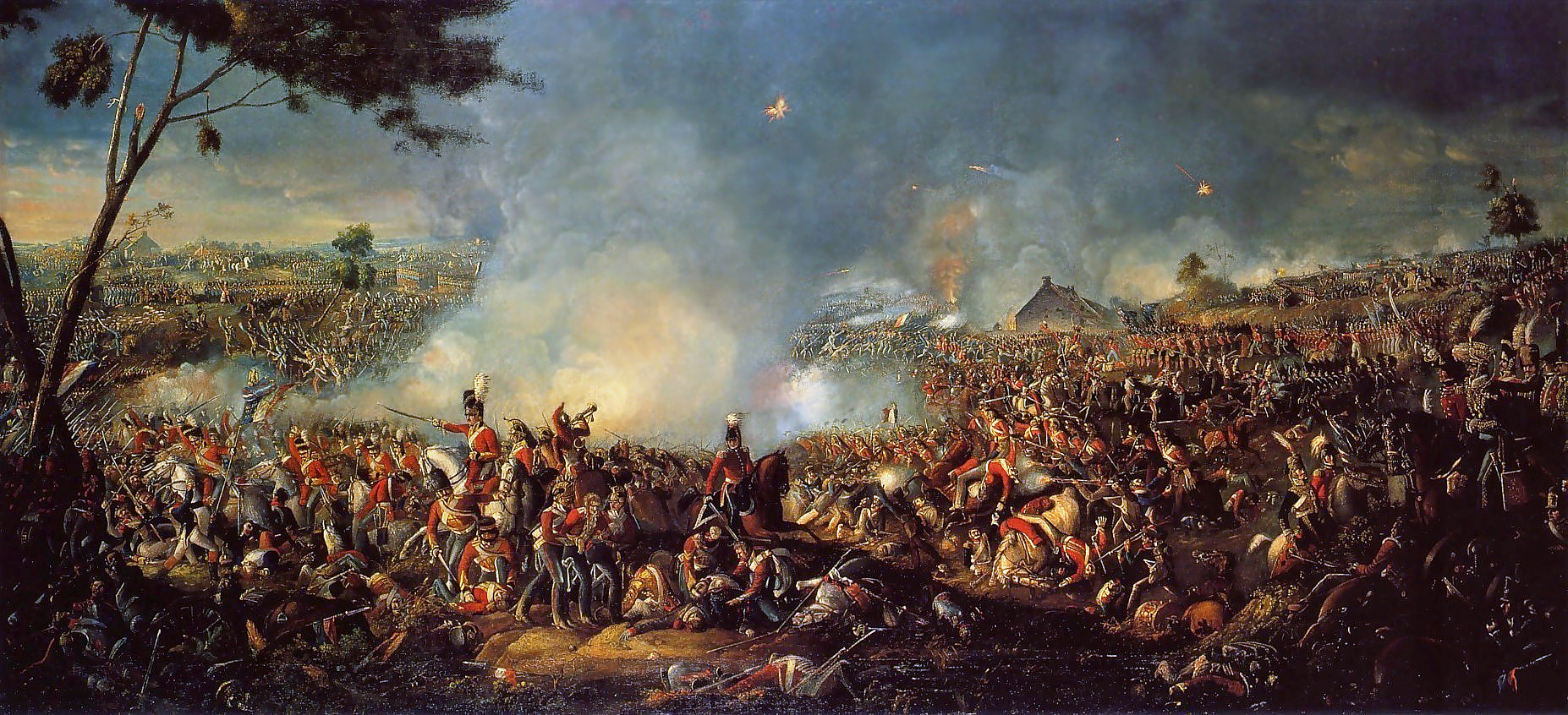
- Artist: William Sadler
- Year: 1815
- Medium: Oil on canvas
- Subject: Battle of Waterloo
- Dimensions: 81 cm × 177 cm (32 in × 70 in)

The Battle of Waterloo is an oil painting on canvas by the Irish artist William Sadler, painted in June 1815. It depicts the Battle of Waterloo, which was fought between a French army under Napoleon and Coalition troops under the Duke of Wellington and Gebhard Leberecht von Blücher.
