= In a Dublin Park, Light and Shade =

Oil on canvas painting by Walter Osborne

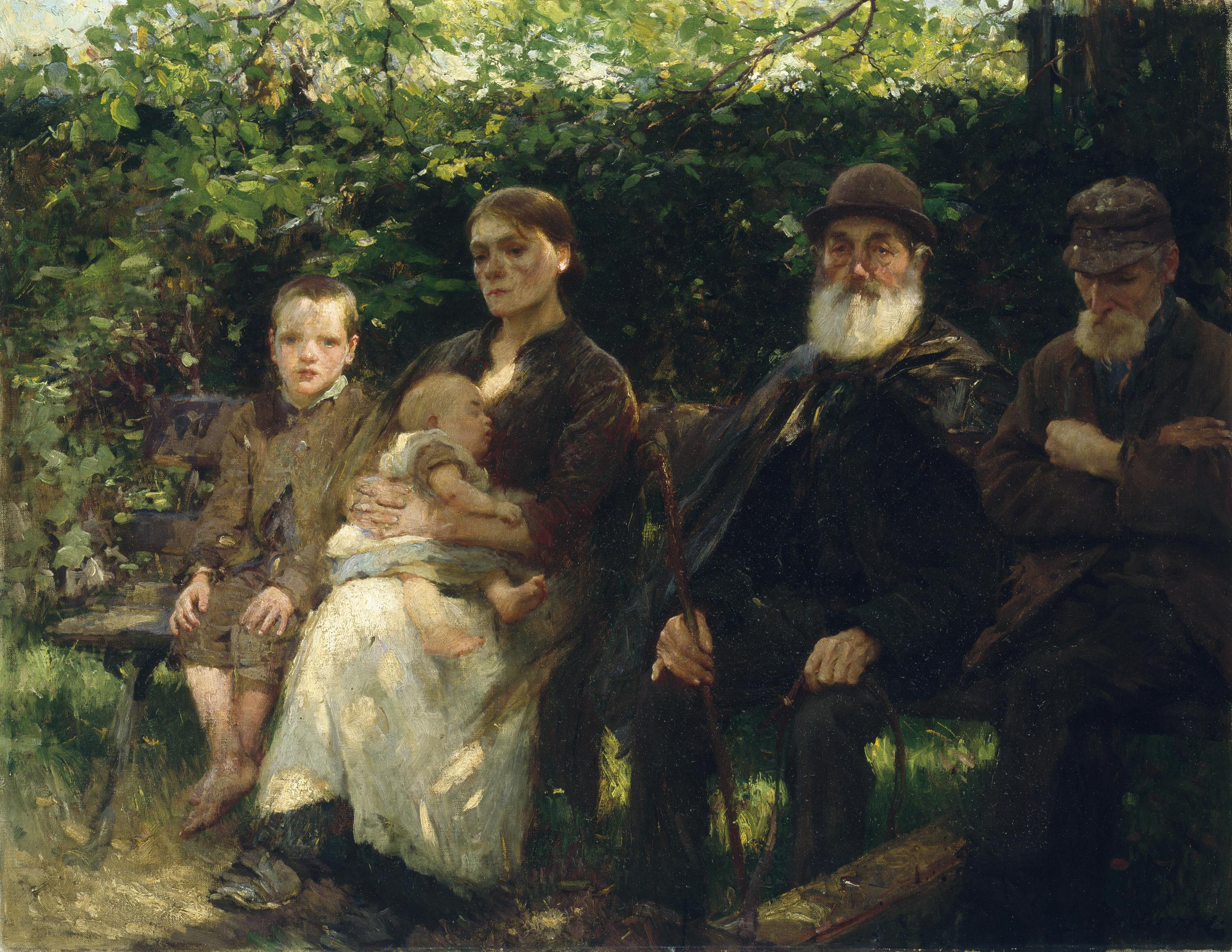
In a Dublin Park, Light and Shade, Walter Osborne, Oil on canvas, 1895. National Gallery of Ireland

In a Dublin Park, Light and Shade is an oil on canvas painting by the Irish artist Walter Osborne, completed c. 1895, and housed in the National Gallery of Ireland. The work is renowned for both its harrowing depiction of Dublin's poor at the turn of the 20th century, and its detailing of the effects of light and shadow, and evidences the artist's learning from the French Impressionists.

It was first exhibited at the Royal Academy in 1895, and was one of Osborne's early commercially successful paintings, and established him as one of Ireland's most important 19th century painters.

== Description ==
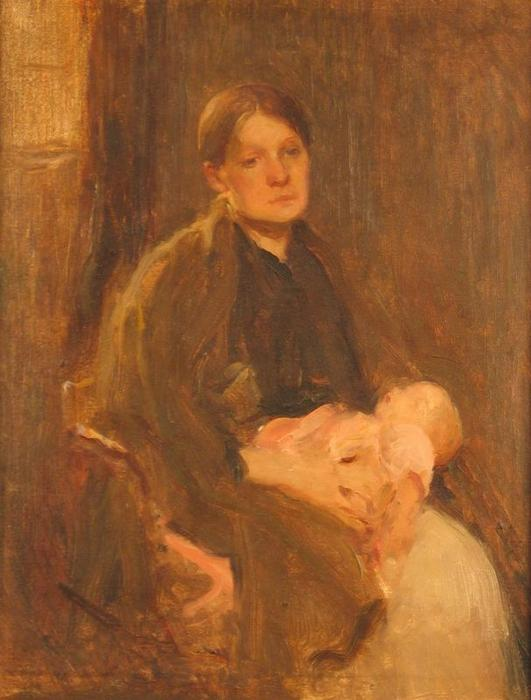
Mother and Child, 1895. Study of the same year

In a Dublin Park, Light and Shade is set on an autumn evening in the Phoenix Park, in Dublin, and shows five figures sitting on a bench. The central character, brilliantly lit by the light falling from the left, is a young woman holding an infant on her knee, who looks out wearily at the viewer, and appears exhausted and ill.

The painting is a study of the journey from infancy, to youth and to old age. The artist's seems to unsentimentally empathise with the plight of the working class subjects, and the painting is filled with poignant unease and tension. The art critic Brian Fallon wrote that "Osborne's humanity and powers of sympathy are plain in his pictures of the poor". The painting is unusually cropped, with the excess space to the left of the bout; while the old man to at the right is almost cut out. This may reflect the painting's preoccupation with ageing and time, the boy has an abundance, the old man has little.

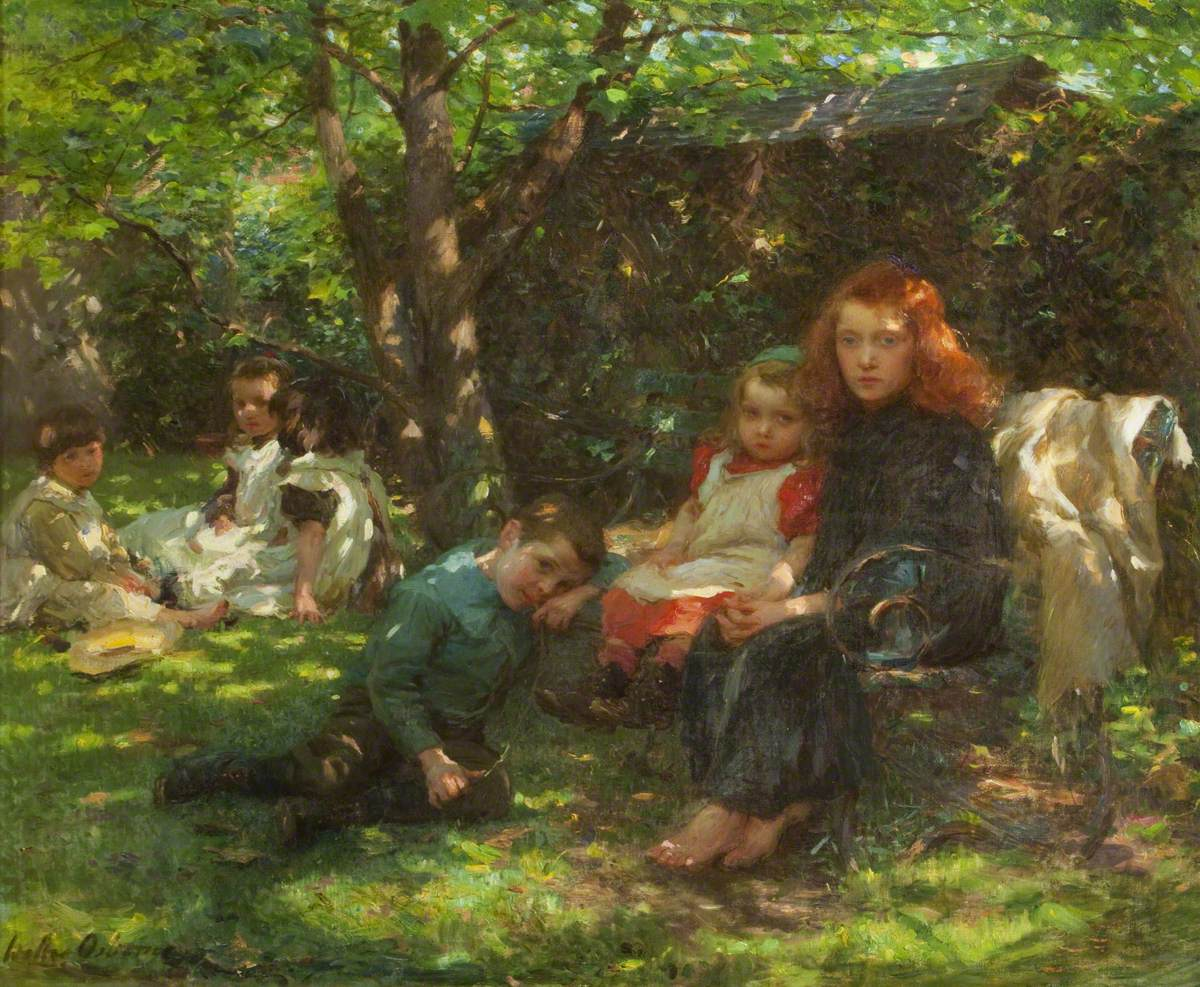
Walter Osborne, Summertime, 1901. Note the similarity perspective of the viewer, in the treatment of light; the expression of the central female, and the alignment of the figures

According to Niamh Keaveney, of the Centre for the Study of Irish Art, "there is a very tangible feeling of struggle and weariness when we look at the figures’ expressions. Despite sitting in this pleasant environment, their faces are still troubled with the worries they came to escape from".

== Sources ==
- Potterton, Homan. "Masterpieces from National Gallery of Ireland. A Loan Exhibition at The National Gallery, London 27 March - 27 May 1985". Dublin: National Gallery of Ireland, 1985. ISBN 0-9031-6218-0
