= The Poachers =

Painting by James Arthur O'Connor

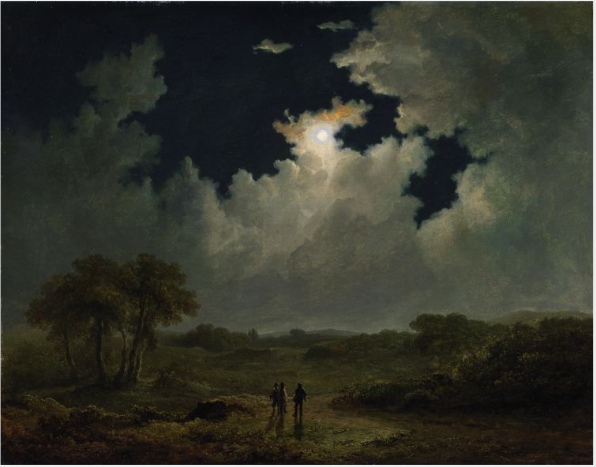
- Artist: James Arthur O'Connor
- Year: 1835
- Type: Oil on canvas, landscape painting
- Dimensions: 55.5 cm × 70.5 cm (21.9 in × 27.8 in)
- Location: National Gallery of Ireland; Dublin

The Poachers is an 1835 oil painting by the Irish artist James Arthur O'Connor. It depicts a moonlight-lit landscape of the Irish countryside with poachers in the foreground.

It is one of O'Connor's best-known works. Today the painting is in the National Gallery of Ireland in Dublin, having been purchased in 1879. In 1904 it appeared at an exhibition of Irish artists at the Guildhall in London.

== Bibliography ==
- Crookshank, Anne. The Sublime and the Beautiful: Irish Art 1700-1830. Pyms Gallery, 2001.
- Kenny, Kevin. Ireland and the British Empire. Oxford University Press, 2004.
- Kinmonth, Claudia. Irish Rural Interiors in Art. Yale University Press, 2006.
