= Sean Rainbird =

British art historian and museum director

- Born: 9th March 1959 (age 66–67); Hong Kong
- Occupations: Art Historian; Former Director of the National Gallery of Ireland

Sean Rainbird (born 9 March 1959) is a British art historian and museum director. From April 2012 to September 2022 he was the Director of the National Gallery of Ireland. In 2022 Caroline Campbell was appointed as new director.

== Early life and education ==
Rainbird was born in Hong Kong. His parents, both originally from England, lived and worked there from 1956 to 1972, when the family returned to the United Kingdom. Rainbird studied art history and German at University College London (1979-1984) before gaining a piano teaching diploma in 1996 and a diploma in management administration from Kingston University in 2001.

== Career ==
Rainbird was Curator, then Senior Curator at Tate (1987-2006). From November 2006 to March 2012 he was Director of the Staatsgalerie Stuttgart, succeeding Dr Christian von Holst and becoming the first non-German native speaker to lead a major German museum.

== Selected works ==
- Rainbird, Sean (ed). (2003). Max Beckmann. London: Tate Publishing. ISBN 1854374931
- Rainbird, Sean (2005). Joseph Beuys and the Celtic World: Scotland, Ireland and England 1970-85. London: Tate Publishing. ISBN 1854375903
- Rainbird, Sean (ed). (2015), Sean Scully, National Gallery of Ireland. ISBN 978-1-904288-58-9
