= National Gallery of Ireland =

Art museum in Dublin, Ireland

- Gailearaí Náisiúnta na hÉireann
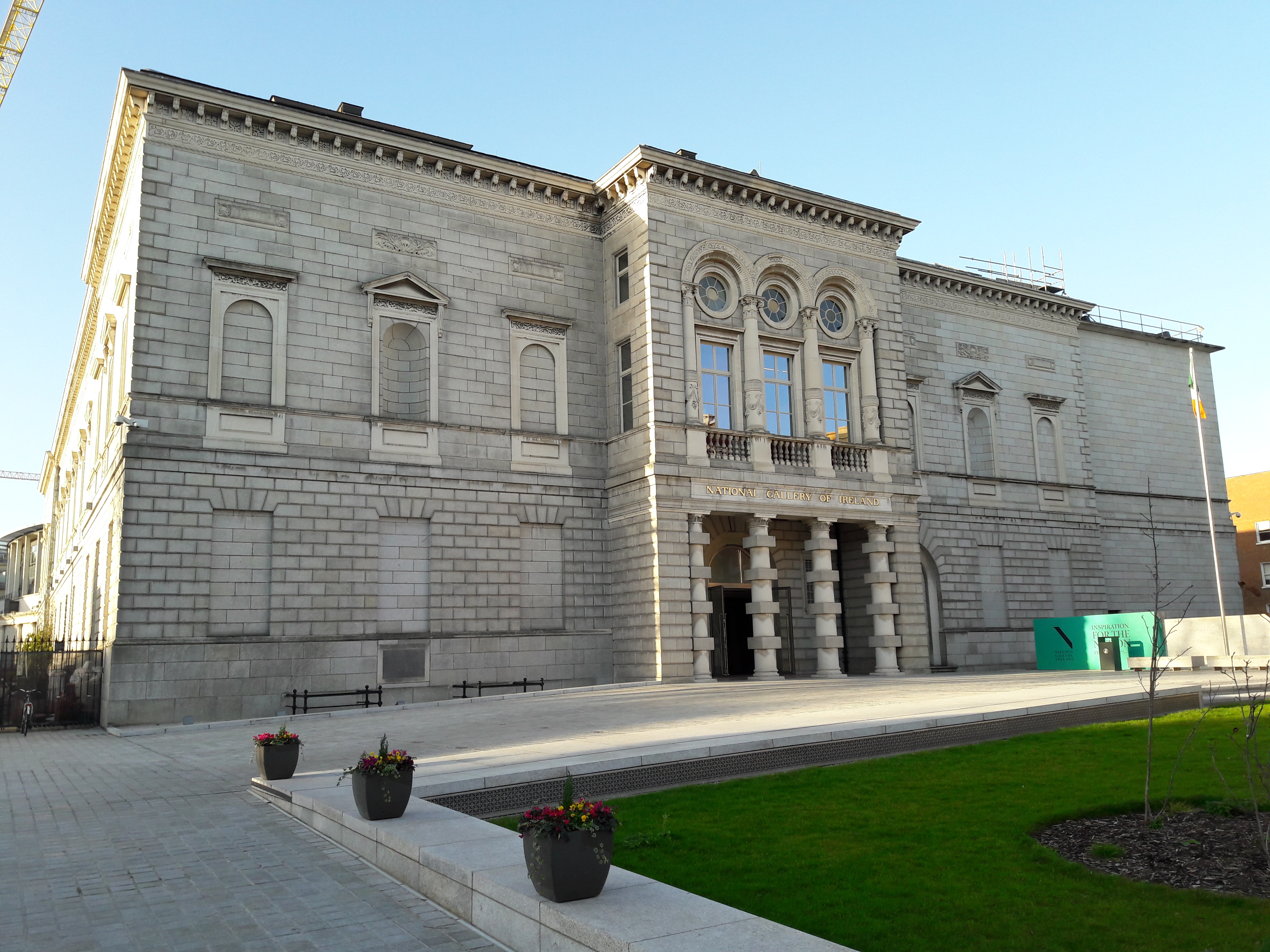
- Interactive fullscreen map
- Established: 1864
- Location: Merrion Square West, Dublin, Ireland
- Coordinates: 53.340914°N 6.252554°W
- Type: Art museum
- Key holdings: Kitchen Maid with the Supper at Emmaus; Portrait of Doña Antonia Zárate; The Taking of Christ; Lady Writing a Letter with her Maid; Connemara Girl
- Director: Caroline Campbell
- Public transit access: Clare Street bus stop Dublin Pearse; Dawson Street (Green Line)
- Website: www.nationalgallery.ie

The National Gallery of Ireland (Irish: Gailearaí Náisiúnta na hÉireann) houses the national collection of Irish and European art. It is located in the centre of Dublin with one entrance on Merrion Square, beside Leinster House, and another on Clare Street. It was founded in 1854 and opened its doors ten years later. The gallery has an extensive, representative collection of Irish paintings and is also notable for its Italian Baroque and Dutch masters painting. The current director is Caroline Campbell.

== History ==
In 1853 an exhibition, the Great Industrial Exhibition, was held on the lawns of Leinster House in Dublin. Among the most popular exhibits was a substantial display of works of art organised and underwritten by the railway magnate William Dargan. The enthusiasm of the visiting crowds demonstrated a public appreciation for art, and it was decided to establish a permanent public art collection as a lasting monument of gratitude to Dargan. The moving spirit behind the proposal was the barrister John Edward Pigot (1822–1871), son of David Richard Pigot, Chief Baron of the Irish Exchequer, and he became one of the first governors of the gallery. The façade of the National Gallery copies the Natural History building of the National Museum of Ireland which was already planned for the facing flank of Leinster House. The building itself was designed by Francis Fowke, based on early plans by Charles Lanyon, and was completed and opened in 1864.

The gallery was not founded around an existing collection, and when the gallery opened it had just 112 paintings. In 1866 an annual purchase grant was established and by 1891 space was already limited. In 1897, the Dowager Countess of Milltown indicated her intention of donating the contents of Russborough House to the gallery. This gift included about 223 paintings, 48 pieces of sculpture, 33 engravings, much silver, furniture and a library, and prompted construction from 1899 to 1903 of what is now called the Milltown Wing, designed by Thomas Newenham Deane.

At around this time Henry Vaughan left 31 watercolours by J. M. W. Turner with the requirement that they could only be exhibited in January, this to protect them from the ill-effects of sunlight. Though modern lighting technology has made this stipulation unnecessary, the gallery continues to restrict viewing of the Vaughan bequest to January and the exhibition is treated as something of an occasion.

Another substantial bequest came with the untimely death in the sinking of the Lusitania of Hugh Lane (1875–1915), since 1914 director of the gallery; not only did he leave a large collection of pictures, he also left part of his residual estate and the Lane Fund has continued to contribute to the purchase of artworks to this day. In addition to his involvement in the gallery, Hugh Lane had also hoped to found a gallery of modern art, something only realised after his death in the Hugh Lane Gallery. George Bernard Shaw also made a substantial bequest, leaving the gallery a third of royalties of his estate in gratitude for the time he spent there as a youth.

The gallery was again extended in 1962 with a new wing designed by Frank DuBerry of the Office of Public Works. This opened in 1968 and is now named the Beit Wing. In 1978 the gallery received from the government the paintings given to the nation by Chester Beatty and in 1987 the Sweeney bequest brought fourteen works of art including paintings by Picasso and Jack B. Yeats. The same year the gallery was once again given some of the contents of Russborough House when Alfred Beit donated 17 masterpieces, including paintings by Velázquez, Murillo, Steen, Vermeer and Raeburn.

In the 1990s a lost Caravaggio, The Taking of Christ, known through replicas, was discovered hanging in a Jesuit house of studies in Leeson Street in Dublin by Sergio Benedetti, senior conservator of the gallery. The Jesuits have allowed this painting to be exhibited in the gallery and the discovery was the cause of national excitement. The painting was on loan to an Italian gallery from February until July 2010 as part of Caravaggio's 400th anniversary. In 1997 Anne Yeats donated sketchbooks by her uncle Jack Yeats and the gallery now includes a Yeats Museum. Denis Mahon, a well-known art critic, promised the gallery part of his rich collection and eight painting from his promised bequest are on permanent display, including Jacob Blessing the Sons of Joseph by Guercino.

=== List of directors ===
- George Mulvany, 1861–1869
- Henry Doyle, 1869–1892
- Walter Armstrong, 1892–1914
- Hugh Lane, 1914–15
- Walter G. Strickland, 1915–16
- Robert Langton Douglas, 1916–1923
- Lucius O'Callaghan, 1923–1927
- Thomas Bodkin, 1927–1935
- George Furlong, 1935–1950
- Thomas McGreevy, 1950–1963
- James White, 1964–1980
- Homan Potterton, 1980–1988
- Raymond Keaveney, 1988–2012
- Sean Rainbird, 2013–2022
- Caroline Campbell 2022–to present

== Millennium Wing ==
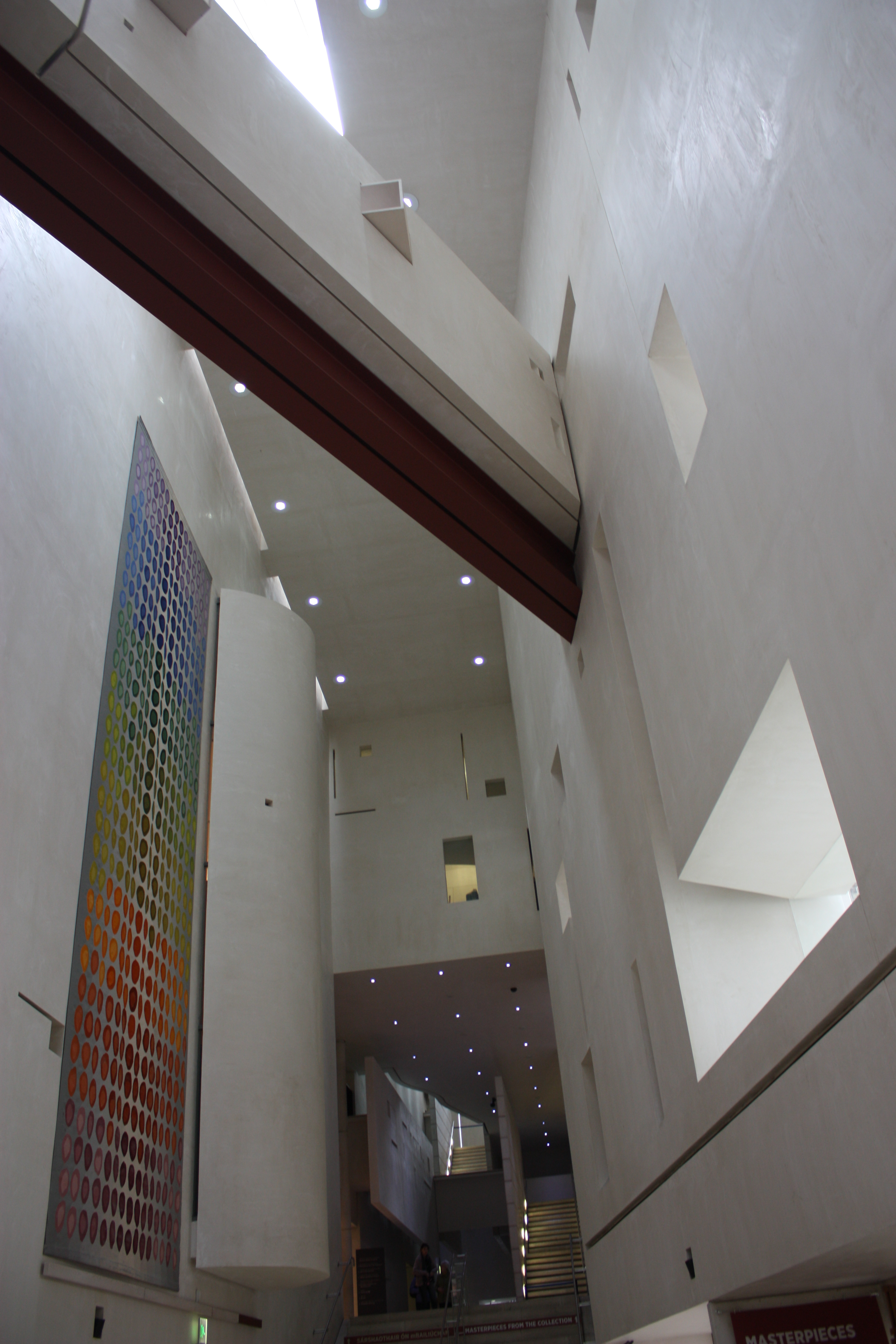
The Millennium Wing in March 2012

A new wing, called the Millennium Wing, was opened in 2002. Unlike the previous two extensions, this new wing has street frontage and the English architects Benson & Forsyth gave it an imposing Bowers Whitbed, Portland stone façade and grand atrium. The design originally involved demolishing an adjoining Georgian terrace house and its ballroom mews; however, the Irish planning appeals authority, An Bord Pleanála, required that they be retained.

== Master development plan ==
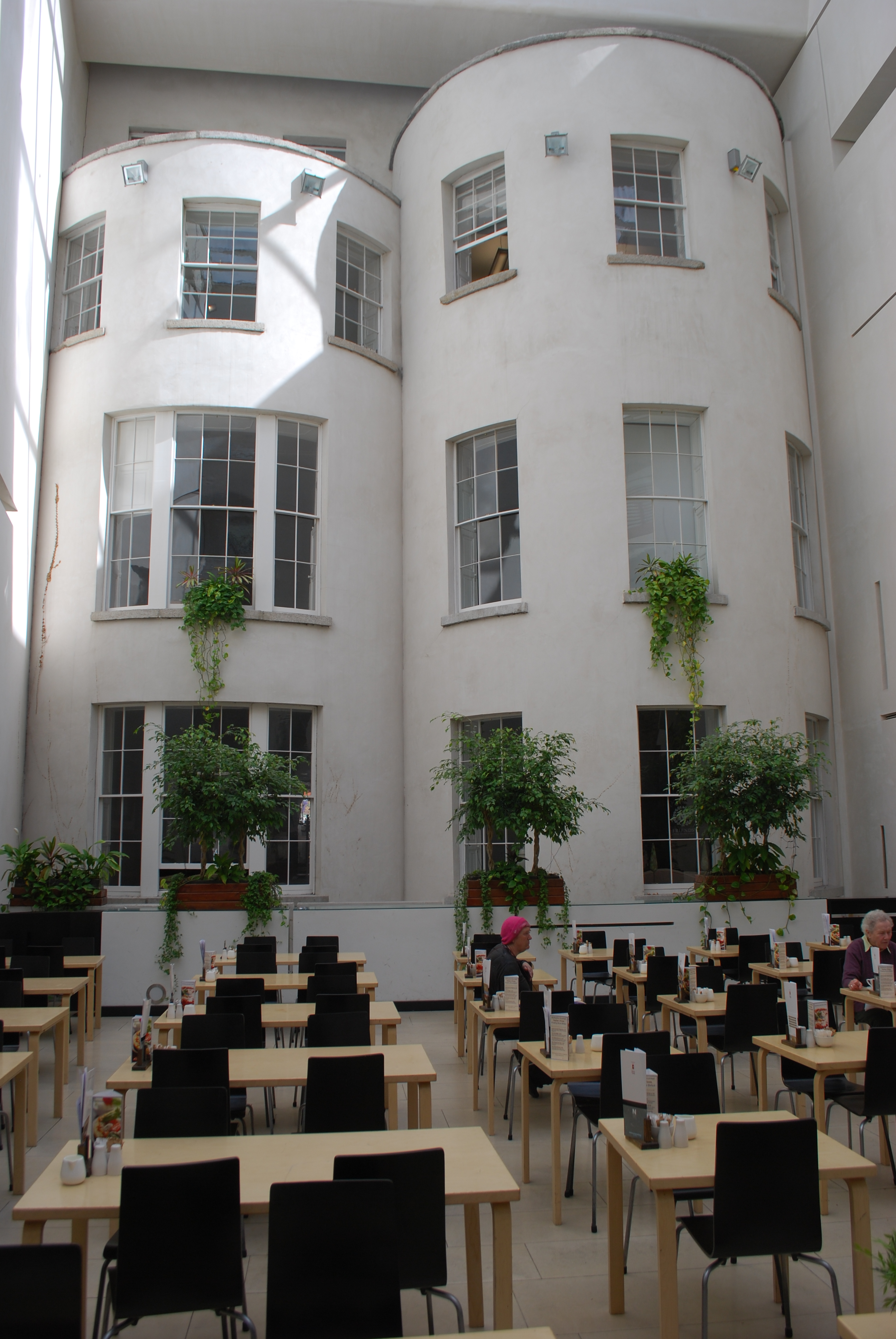
View of interior, c.2013

In March 2011, the Office of Public Works (OPW), in association with the gallery, commenced work on the historic complex at Merrion Square to address a critical need for the repair and renovation of the fabric of the Dargan (1864) and Milltown (1903) wings, together with the provision of much needed additional accommodation. The first phase of the works programme involved the removal and replacement of the Dargan Wing roof. The next two phases of the project involved the replacement of the Milltown Wing roof, followed by an extensive upgrade of the fabric and services of the two buildings whilst reclaiming their original period elegance. Refurbishment of the two wings was completed in June 2017.

== Location, access and facilities ==
The National Gallery of Ireland is located in the heart of Georgian Dublin. There are two entrances, one at Merrion Square and the other at Clare Street. Admission to the gallery is free and many talks, tours and events, as well as the audioguide, are also free of charge. The gallery launched a free smartphone app in 2013.

Dublin Bus routes 4, 7 and 7a all pass by the gallery. The Pearse Street DART station is 5 minutes on foot as is the Dawson stop on the green line of the Luas. The Abbey Street stop of the red line of the Luas is a 20-minute walk away. There are two dublinbikes stations just outside the gallery, one at Clare Street and the other at Merrion Square West.

All galleries and entrances are wheelchair and buggy accessible and there are disabled parking spaces outside the Merrion Square entrance. Tours for the visually and hearing impaired are regularly organised. Visitors with guide dogs are welcome in the gallery. The lecture theatre, AV room and gallery shop are all fitted with a loop system for the hearing impaired.

== Highlights ==
The collection has about 14,000 artworks, including about 2,500 oil paintings, 5,000 drawings, 5,000 prints, and some sculpture, furniture and other works of art.

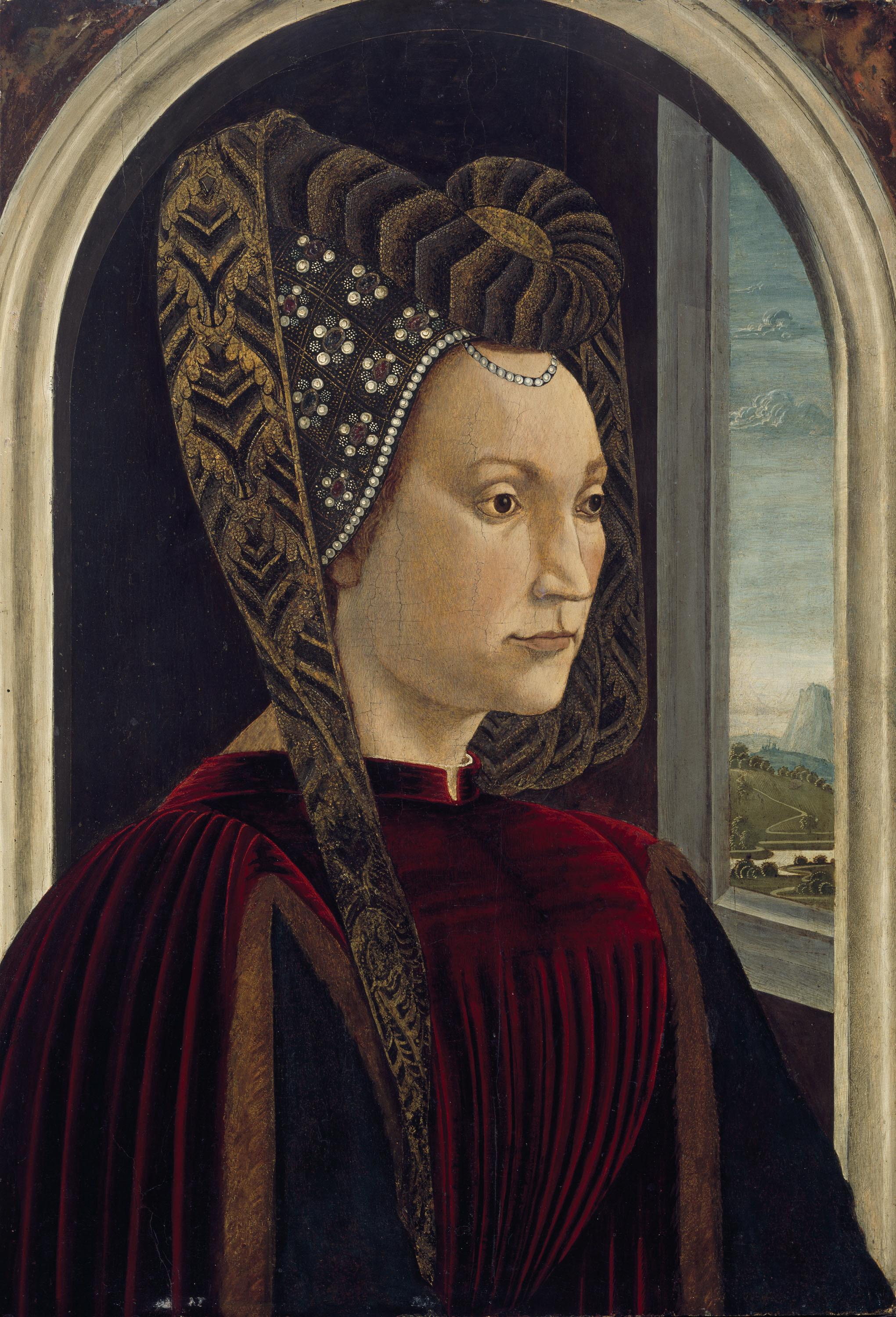
Domenico Ghirlandaio, Presumed Portrait of Clarice Orsini, Wife of Lorenzo the Magnificent, before 1494

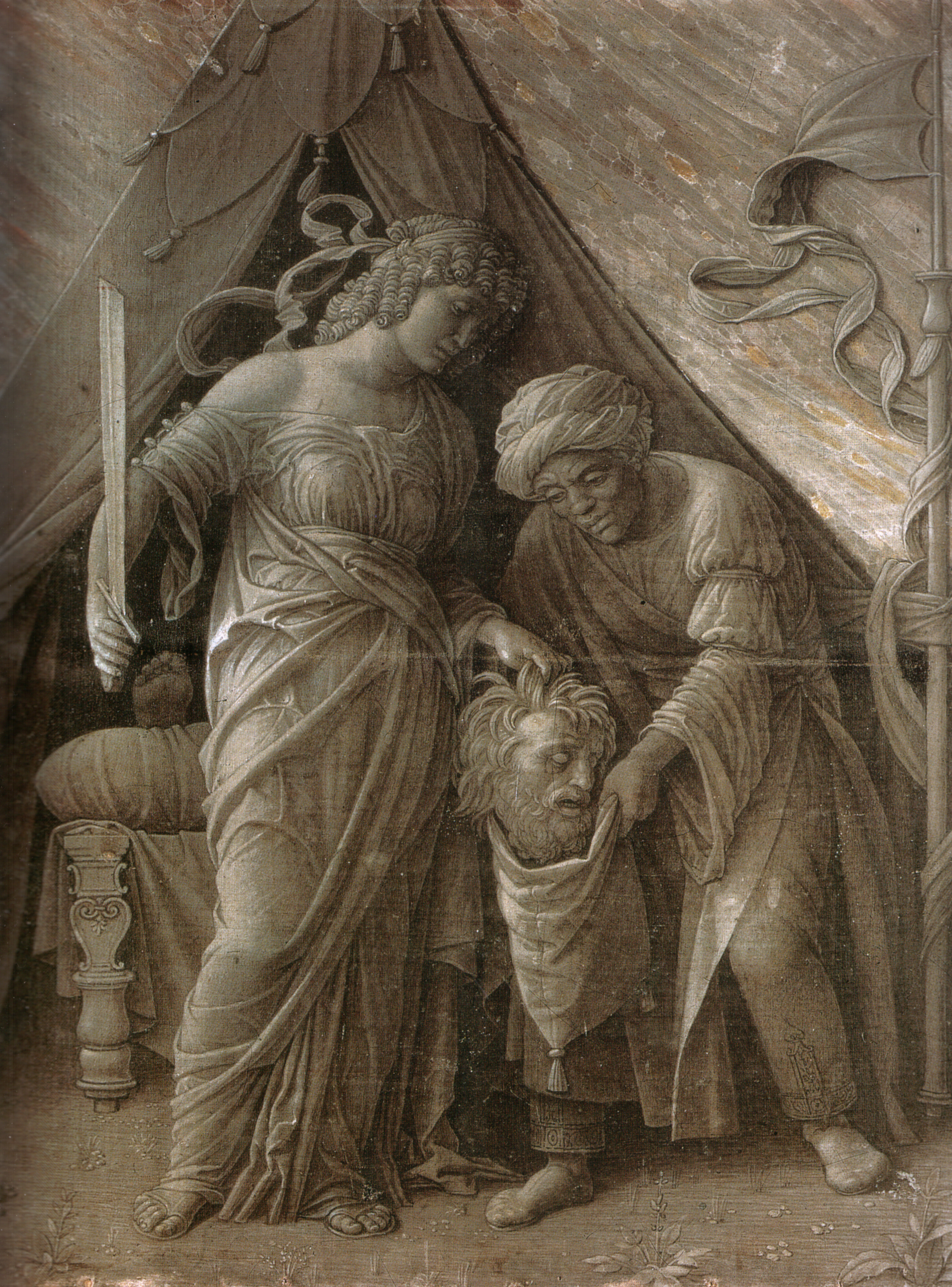
Andrea Mantegna, Judith, 1490s

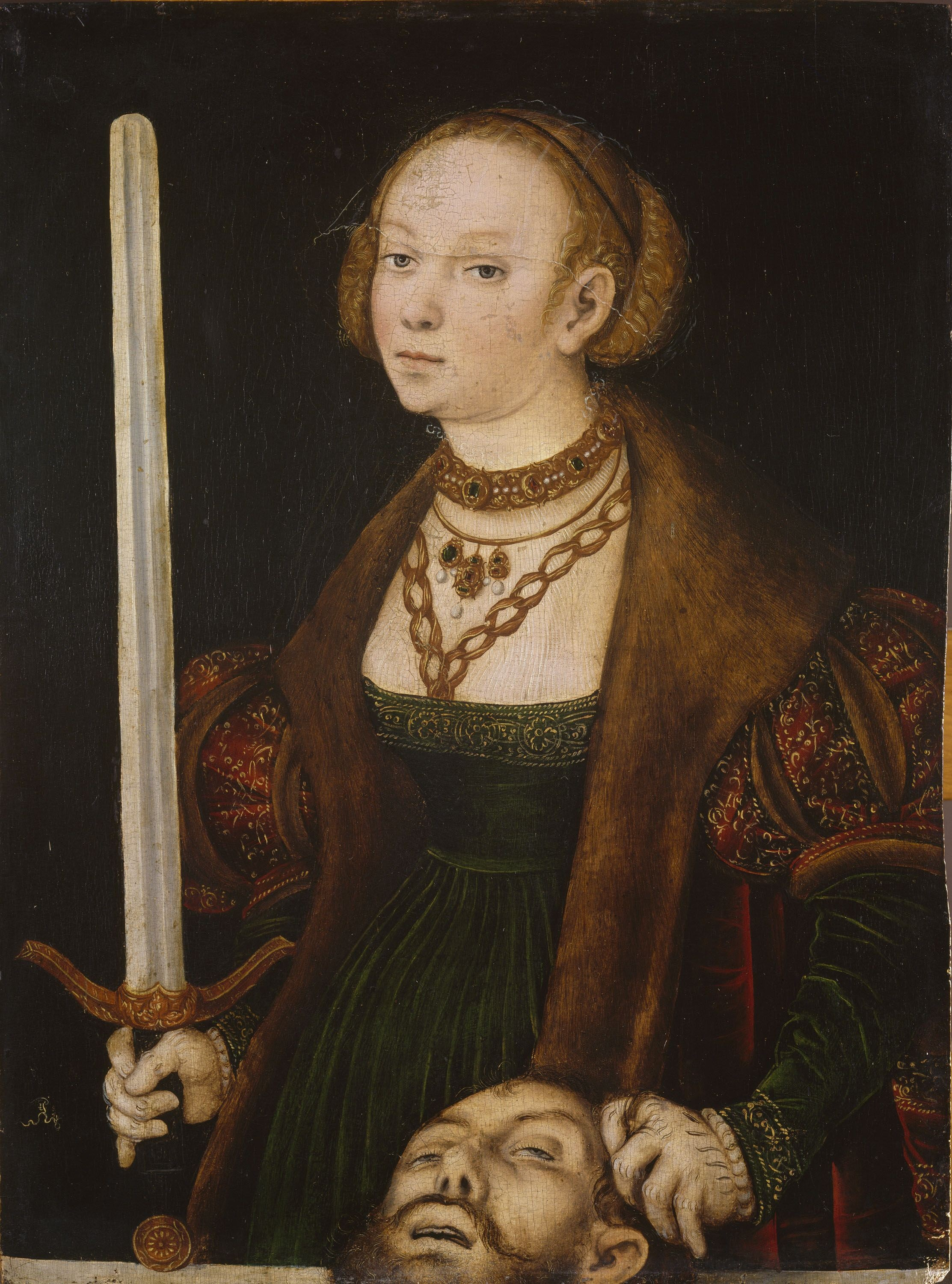
Workshop of Lucas Cranach the Elder, Judith with the Head of Holofernes, c 1550

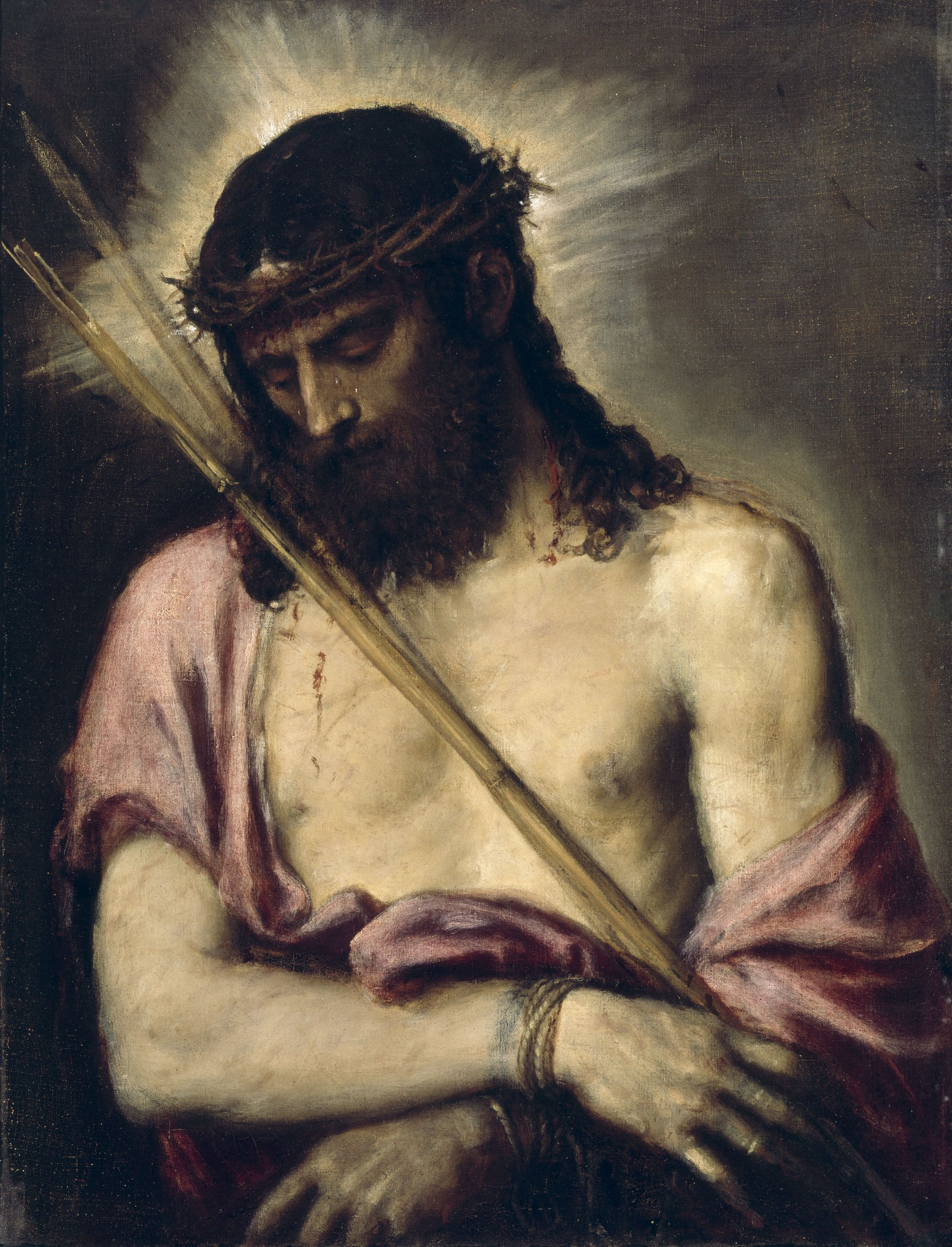
Titian, Ecce Homo, 1558–60

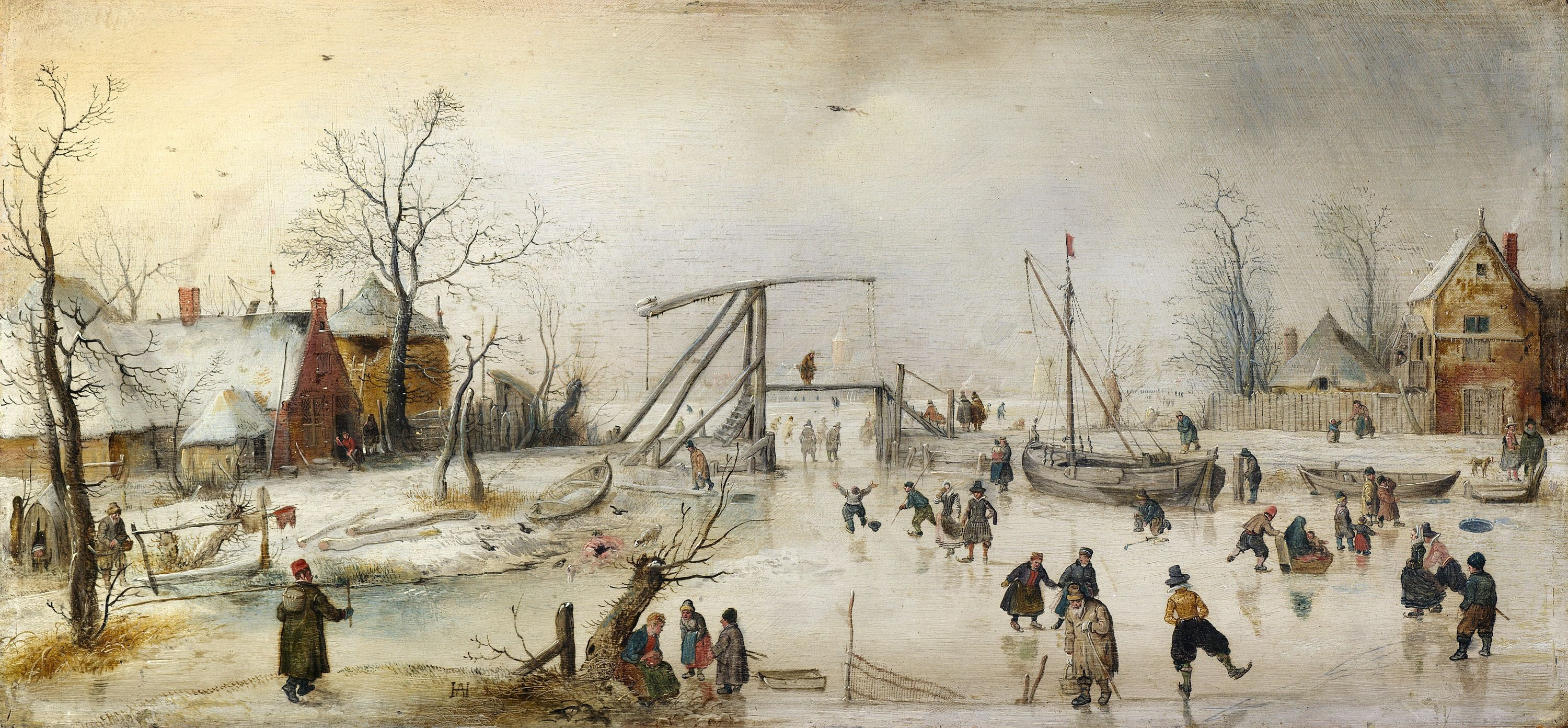
Hendrick Avercamp, Scene on the Ice, c 1620

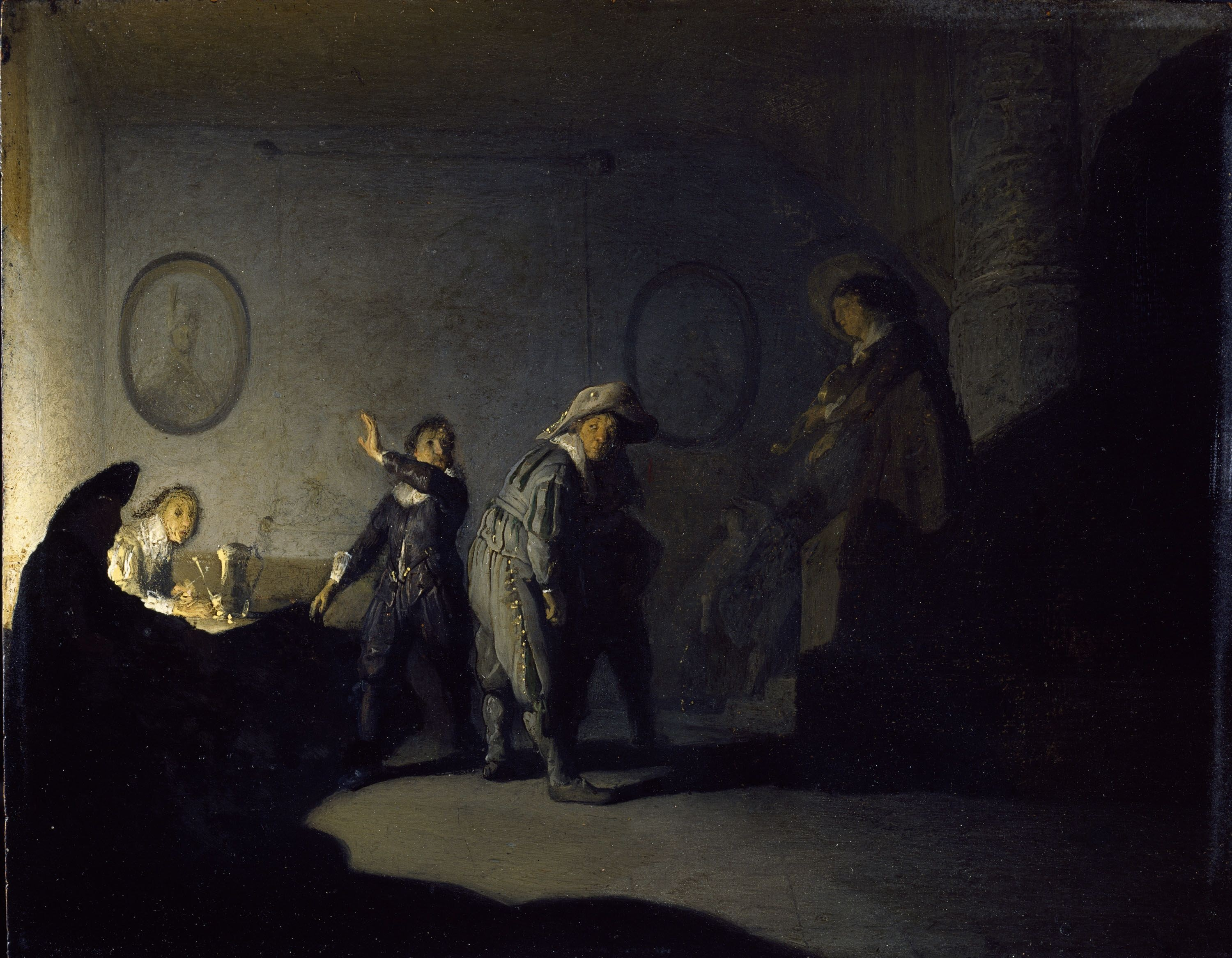
Rembrandt, Interior with Figures, 1628

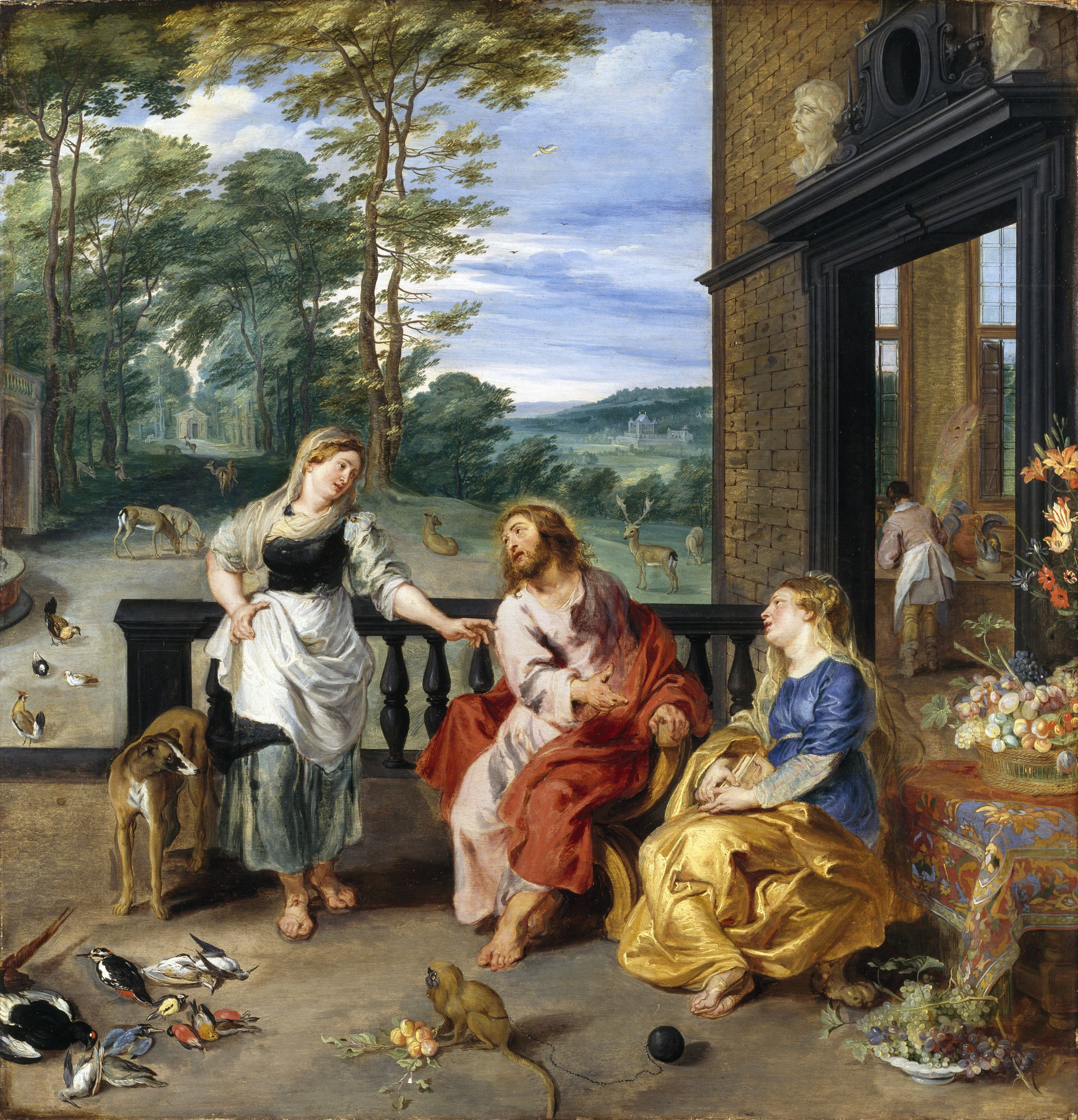
Jan Brueghel the Younger and Peter Paul Rubens, Christ in the House of Martha and Mary, 1628

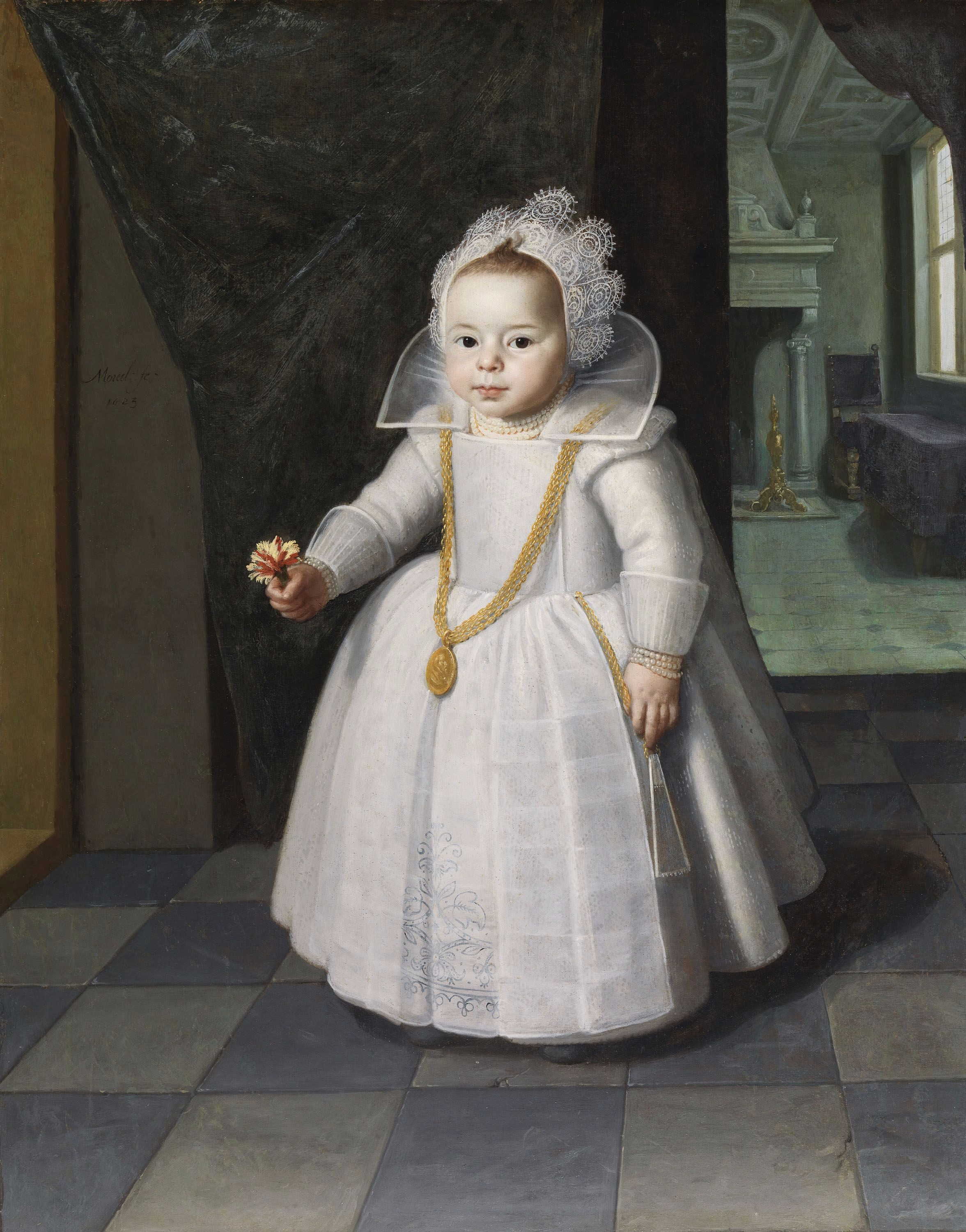
Paulus Moreelse, Girl wearing a Gold Chain, 1632

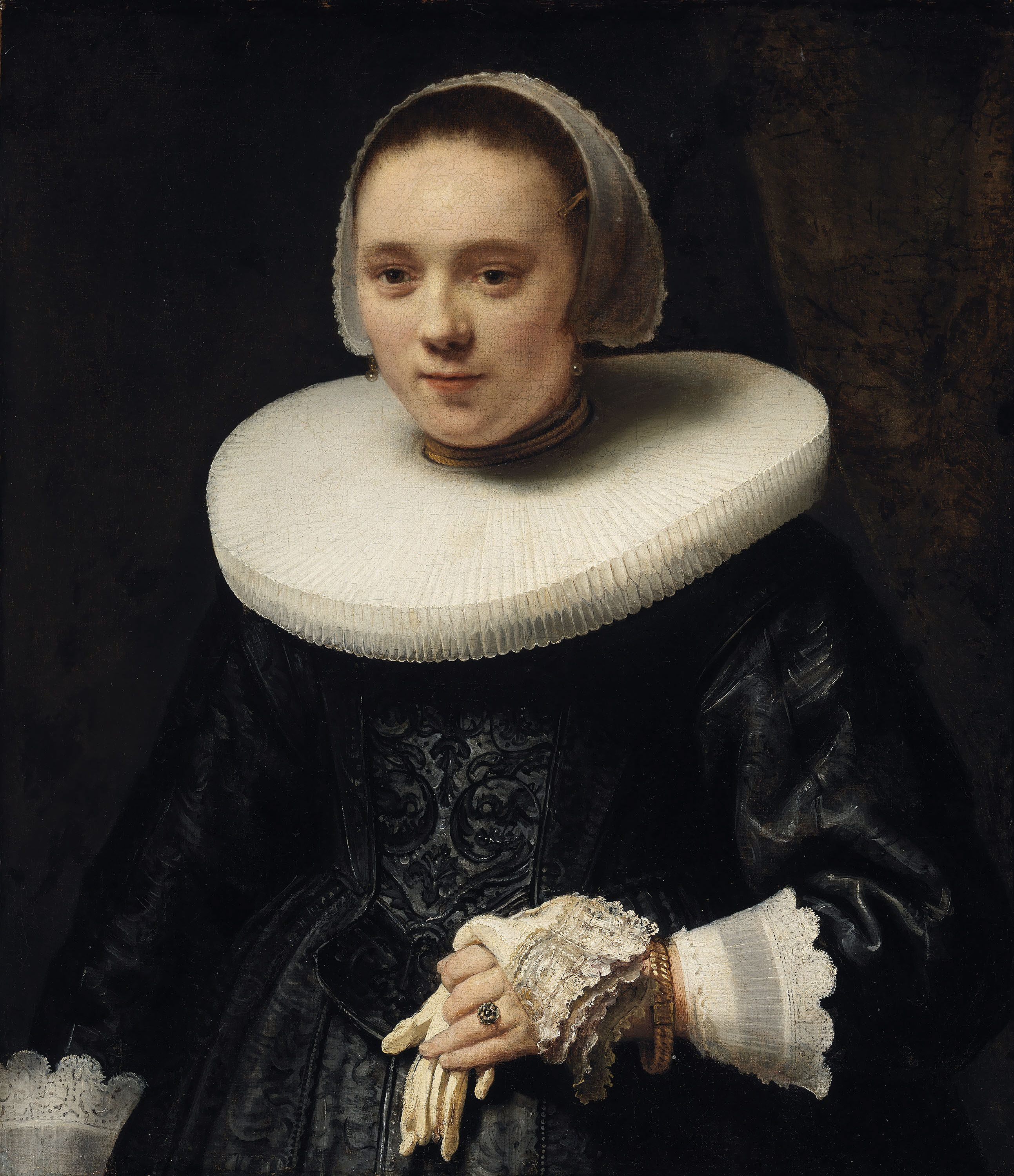
Rembrandt, Portrait of a Woman with Gloves, c 1632–1642

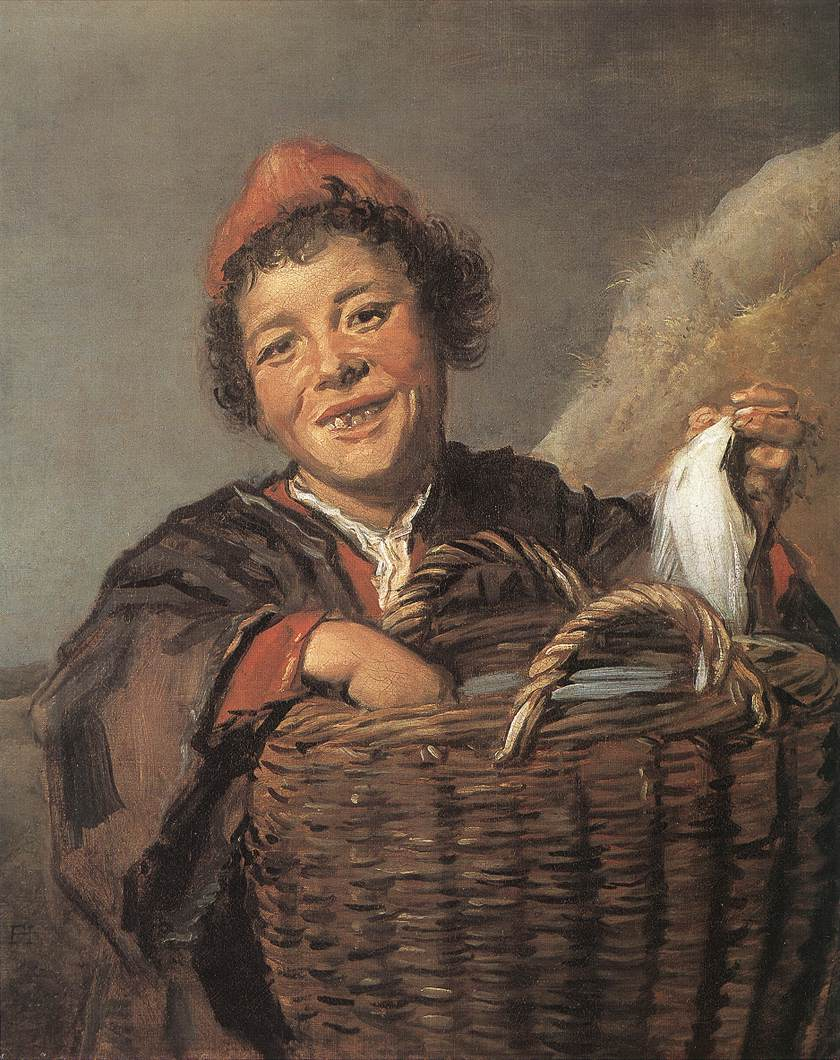
Frans Hals, Fisher Boy, c 1630–32

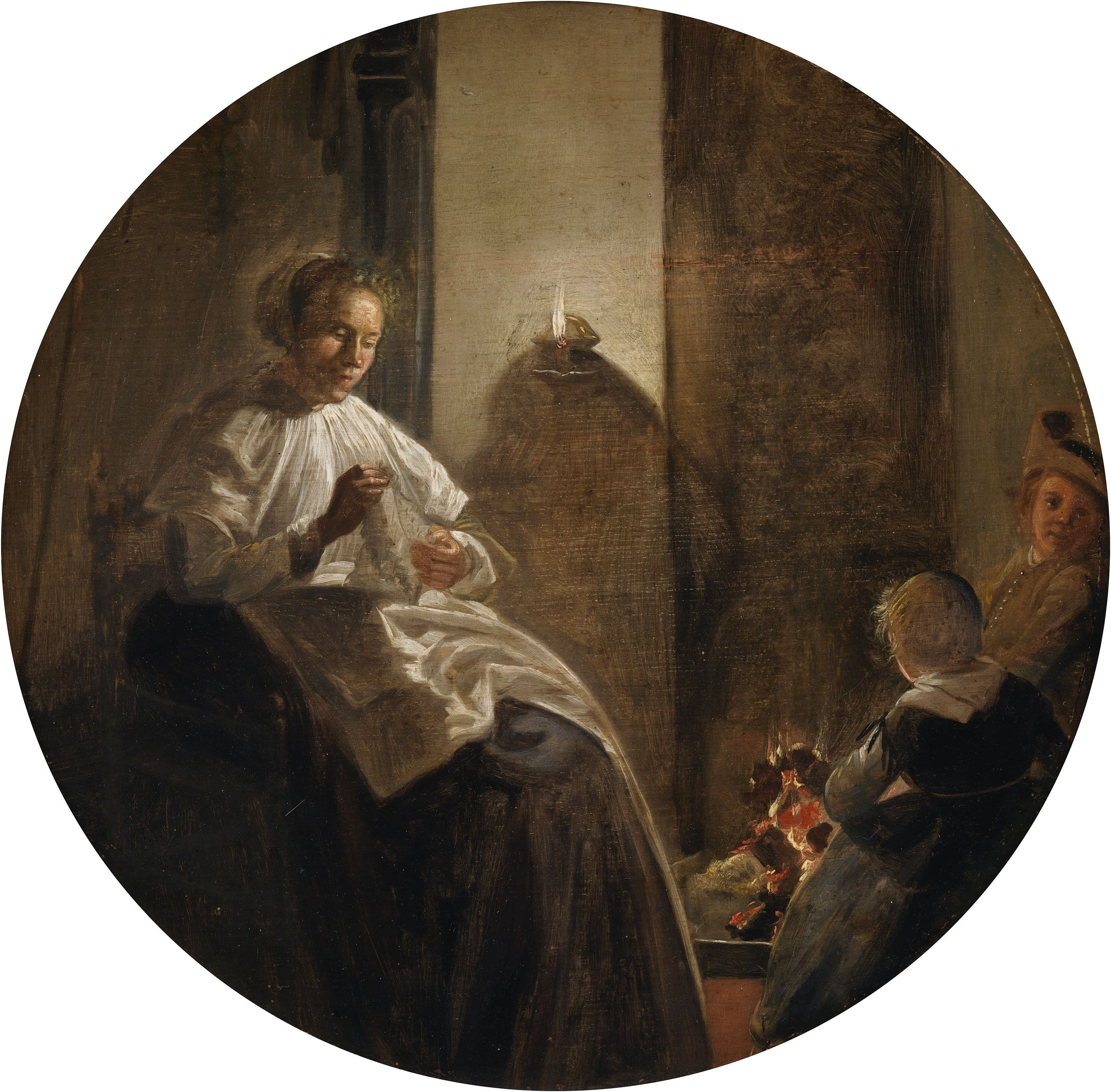
Dirck Hals, A Woman Sewing by Candlelight, 1633

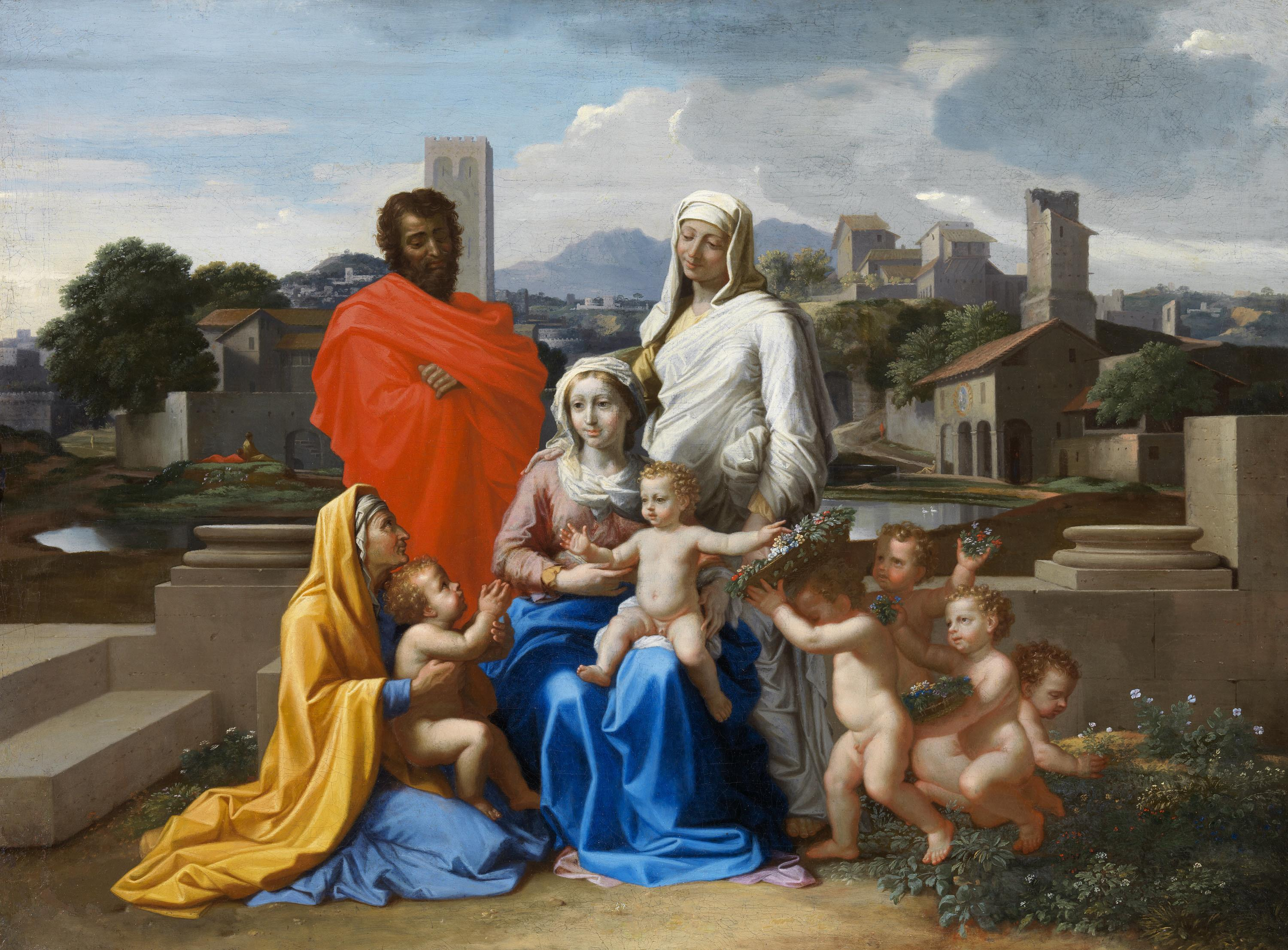
Nicolas Poussin, The Holy Family (Sainte Famille), c 1649

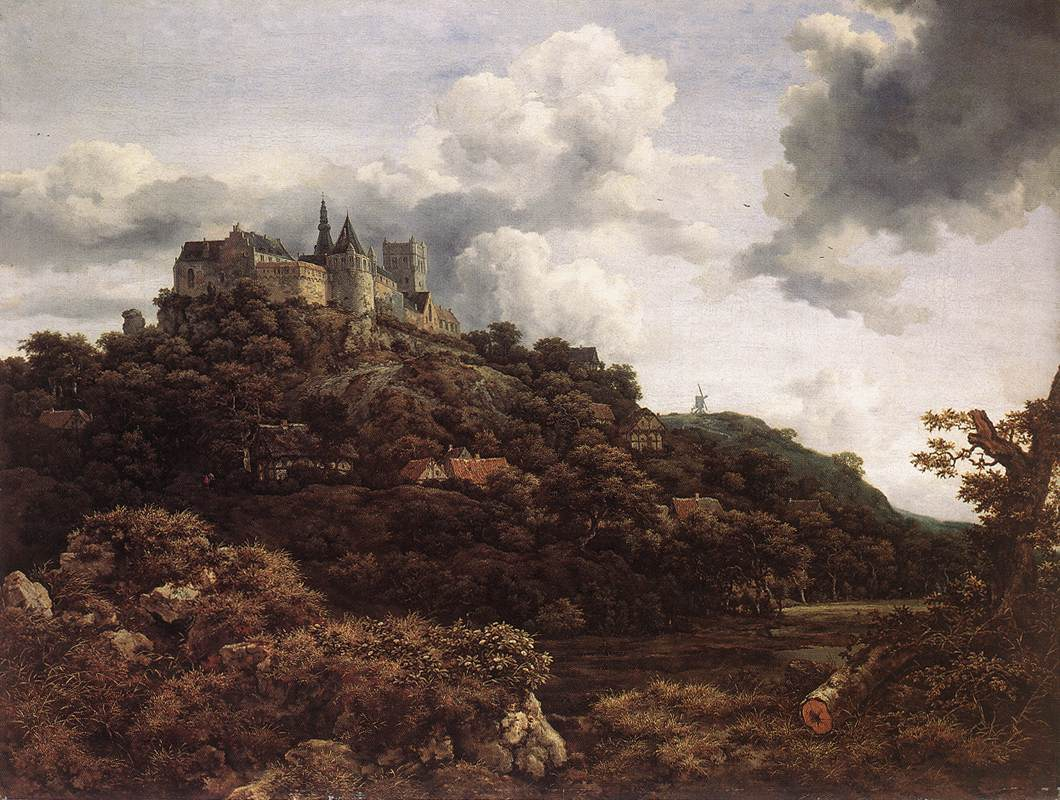
Jacob van Ruisdael, Burg Bentheim, 1653

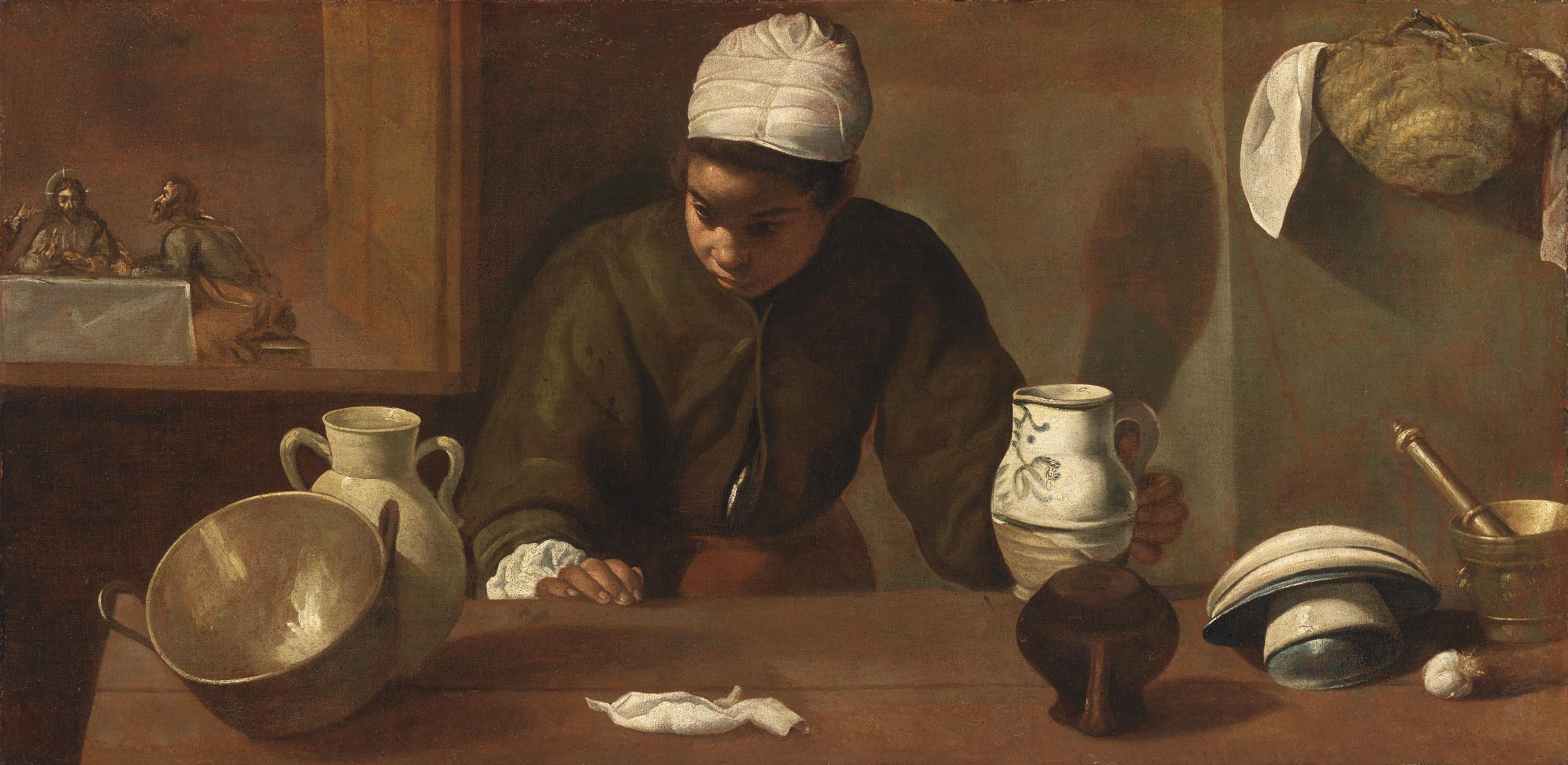
Diego Velázquez, La mulata (La cena de Emaús), before 1660

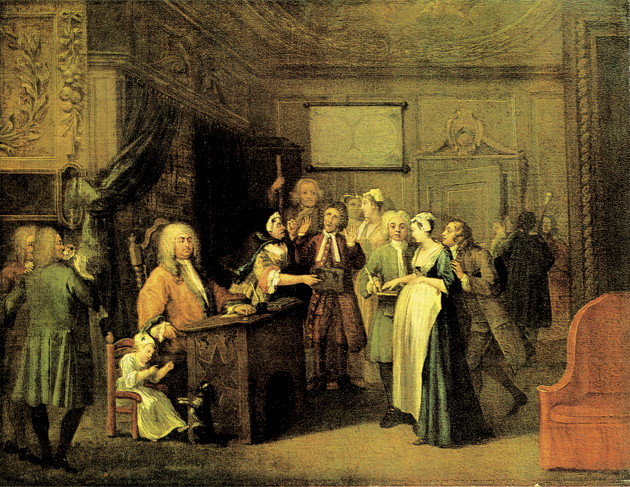
William Hogarth, A Woman Swearing a Child to a Grave Citizen, c.1729

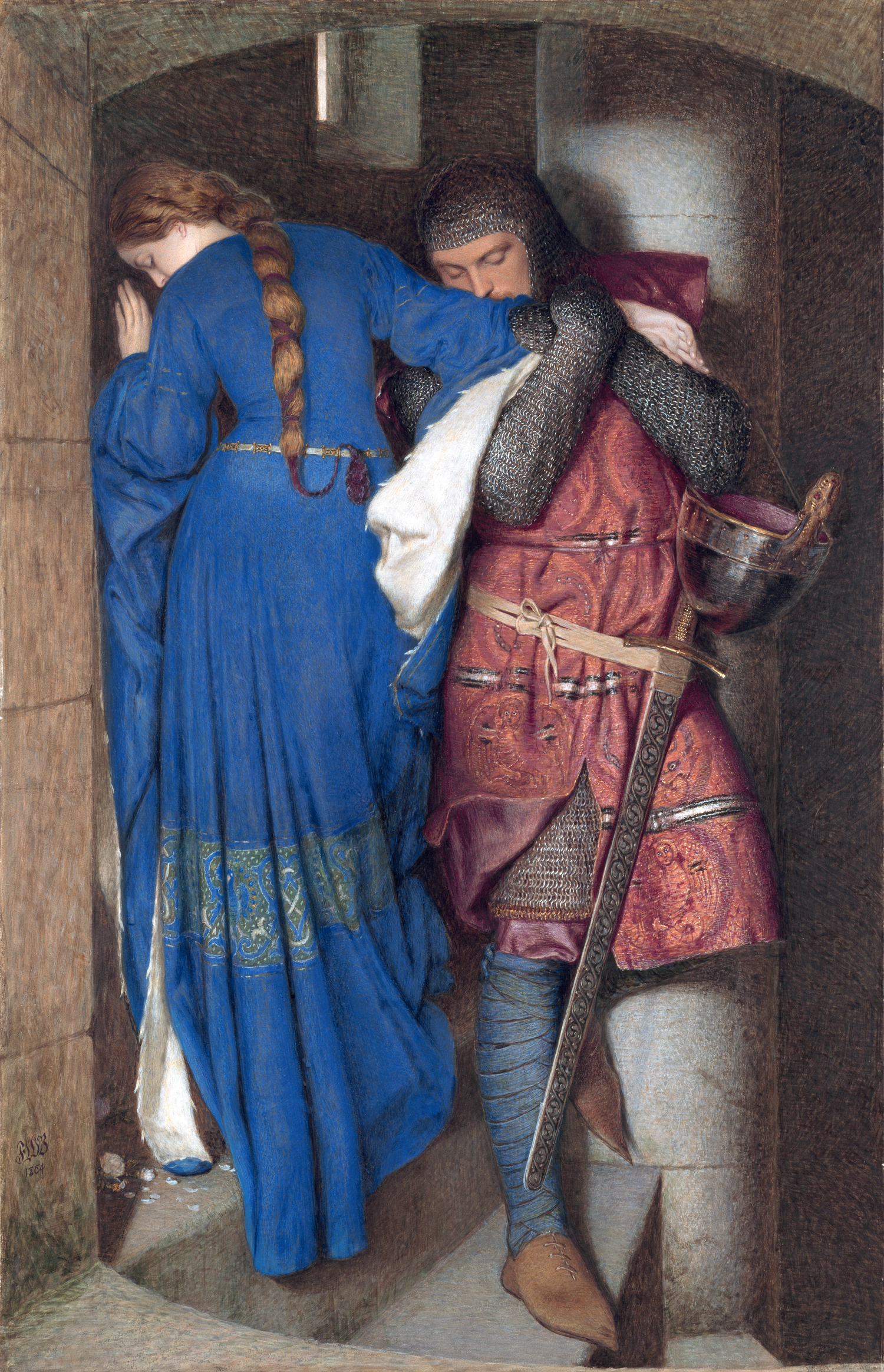
Frederic William Burton, The Meeting on the Turret Stairs, 1864

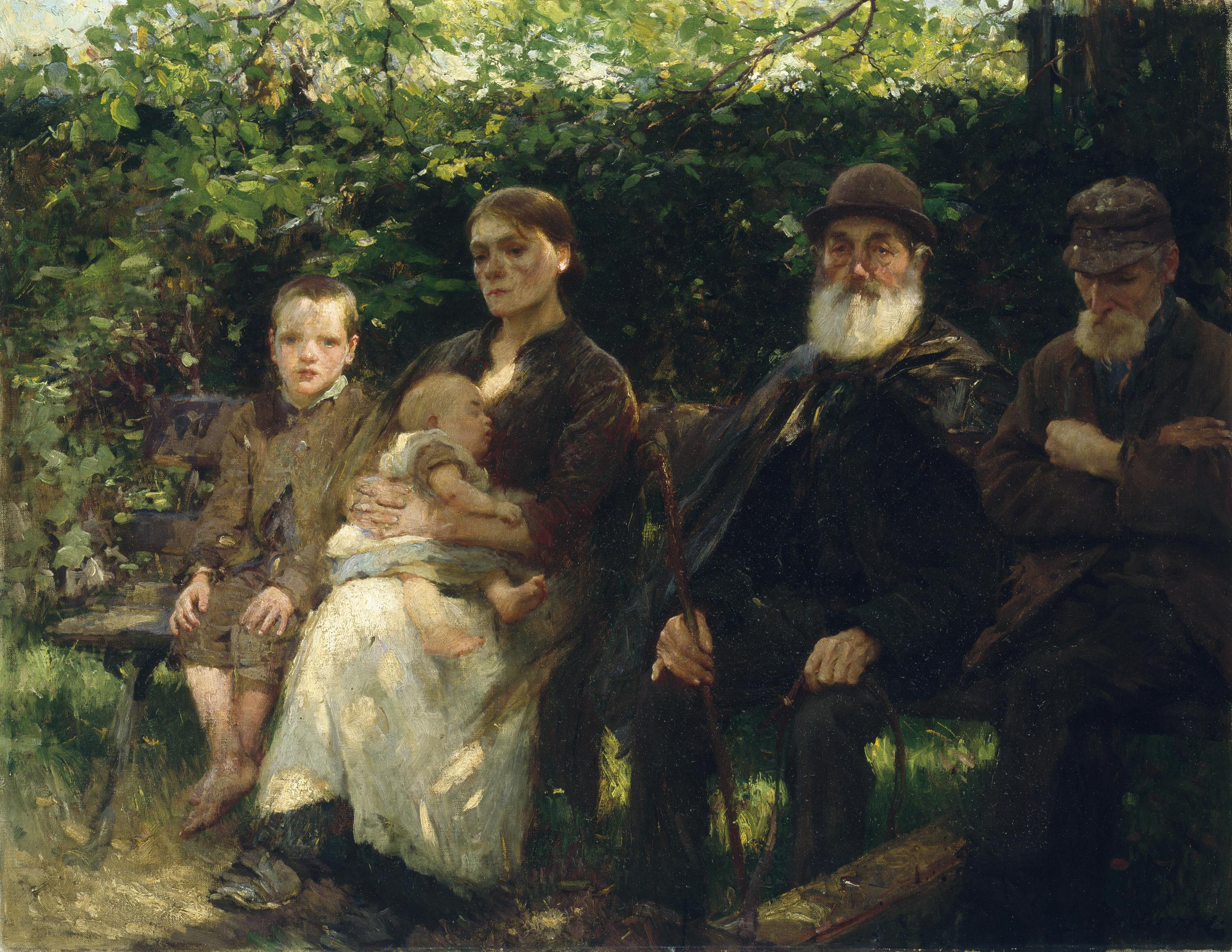
Walter Osborne, In a Dublin Park, Light and Shade, 1895

=== Spanish ===
- Luis de Morales (c.1592–86) St Jerome in the Wilderness 1570s
- Jusepe de Ribera (1591?–1652) St Onuphrius late 1620s
- Diego Velázquez (1599–1660) Kitchen Maid with the Supper of Emmaus, c.1617–18
- Francisco de Zurbarán (1598–1664) The Immaculate Conception early 1660s
- Bartolomé Esteban Murillo (1617–82) The Return of the Prodigal Son c.1660
- Francisco José de Goya y Lucientes (1746–1828) Dona Antonia Zarate c.1805–06
- Pablo Ruiz Picasso (1881–1973) Still-Life with Mandolin 1924
- Juan Gris (1887–1927) Pierrot 1921

=== French ===
- Jacques Yverni (flourished 1410–38) The Annunciation c.1435
- Nicolas Poussin (1594–1665)
  - Acis and Galatea 1627–28
  - The Lamentation over the Dead Christ 1657–60
- Jean Lemaire (1598–1659) Architecture Landscape with Classical Figures 1627–30
- Jean-Baptiste-Siméon Chardin (1699–1779) Still Life: Two Rabbits, a Grey Partridge, Game Bag and Powder Flask 1731
- Jean-Honoré Fragonard (1732–1806) Venus and Cupid (Day) c.1755
- Eugène Delacroix (1798–1863) Demosthenes on the Seashore 1859
- Gustave Courbet (1819–77) Portrait of Adolphe Marlet 1851
- Alfred Sisley (1819–99) The Banks of the Canal du Loing at Saint-Mammes 1888
- Claude Monet (1840–1926) Argenteuil Basin with a Single Sailboat 1874
- Paul Signac (1863–1935) Lady on the Terrace 1898
- Kees van Dongen (1877–1968) Stella in a Flowered Hat c.1907
- Chaïm Soutine (1893–1943) Landscape with the Flight of Stairs c.1922

=== Italian ===
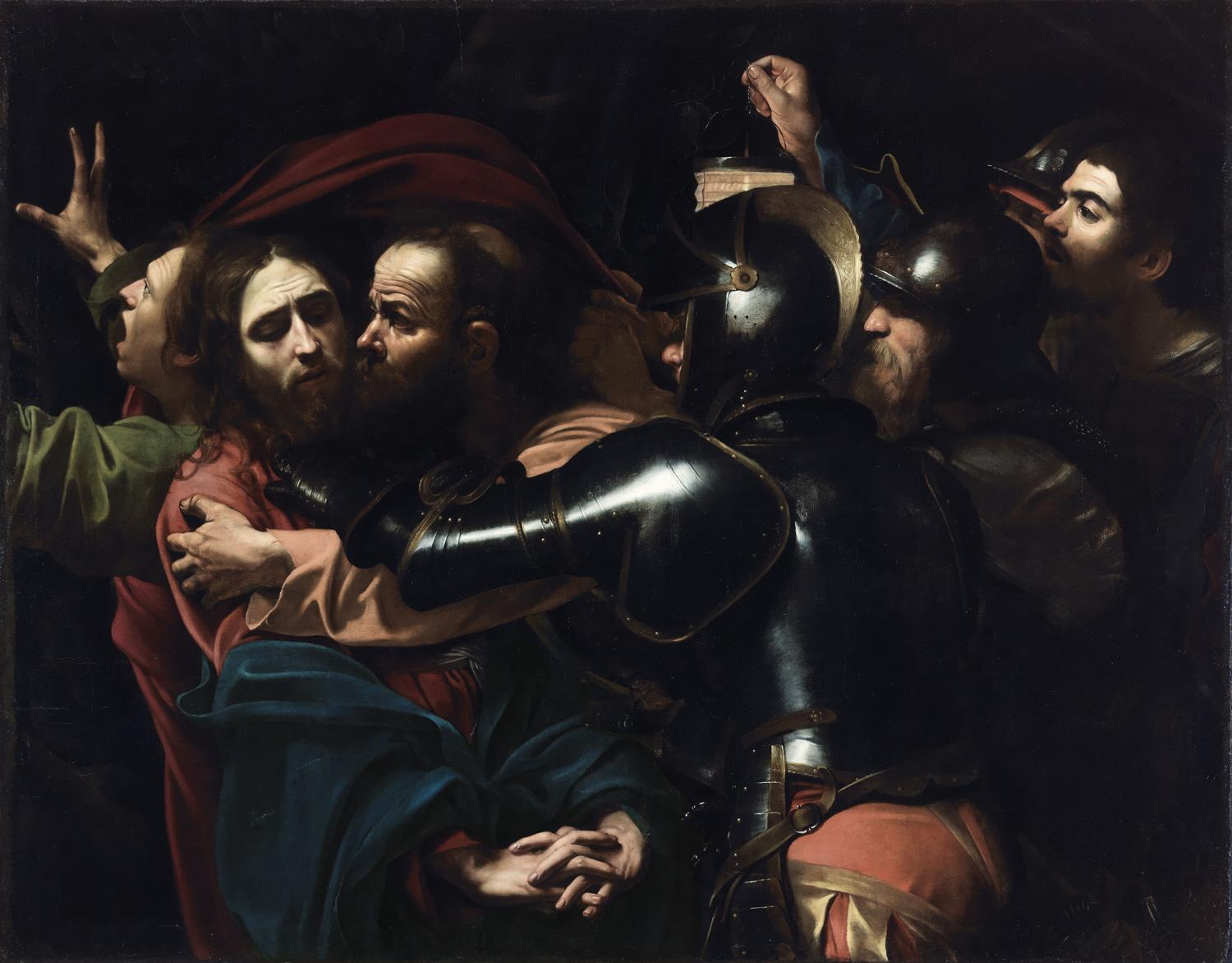
Caravaggio The Taking of Christ 1602

- Master of Verucchio (14th century) The Crucifixion, Noli me tangere c.1330–40
- Fra Angelico (1417–55) Sts Cosmas and Damian and their Brothers surviving the Stake c.1440–42
- Zanobi Strozzi (attribute to) (1412–68) Assumption of the Virgin with Sts Jerome and Francis 1460s
- Filippino Lippi (1457–1504) Portrait of a Musician late 1480s
- Titian (c.1485/90–1576) Ecce Homo c.1558/60
- Giovan Battista Moroni (before 1524–1578) Portrait of a Gentleman and his two Children c.1570
- Caravaggio (1571–1610) The Taking of Christ 1602
- Guido Reni (1575–1624) The Suicide of Cleopatra c.1639–40
- Domenichino (1581–1641) Saint Mary Magdalene c.1625
- Guercino (1591–1666) Jacob blessing the Sons of Jacob c.1620
- Sassoferrato (1609–85) Virgin and Child 1630s
- Luca Giordano (1634–1705) Venus, Mars and the Forge of Vulcan 1660s
- Carlo Maratta (1625–1713) The Rape of Europa c. 1680–1685
- Francesco Solimena (1657–1747) Allegory of Winter c.1690
- Canaletto (1697–1768) St. Mark's Square c.1756
- Ugolino di Nerio (early 14th Century) Prophet Isaiah
- Paolo Uccello (1397–1475) Virgin and Child

=== German and Swiss ===
- Salzburg School Christ on the Cross with the Virgin Mary and John c.1430
- Master of the Youth of St Romold (active c.1490) St Romold taking leave of his Parents c.1490
- Georg Pencz (active 1500–50) Portrait of a Gentleman 1549
- Angelica Kauffman (1741–1807) The Ely Family 1771
- Emil Nolde (1867–1956) Two Women in a Garden 1915

=== Flemish ===
- Pieter Brueghel the Younger (1564–c.1637) Peasant Wedding 1620
- Peter Paul Rubens (1577–1640) St Peter finding the Tribute Money 1617–18
- Jacob Jordaens (1593–1678)
  - The Veneration of the Eucharist c.1630
  - The Supper at Emmaus c.1645–65
- Anthony van Dyck (1599–1641) A Boy standing on a Terrace c.1623–24

=== Dutch ===
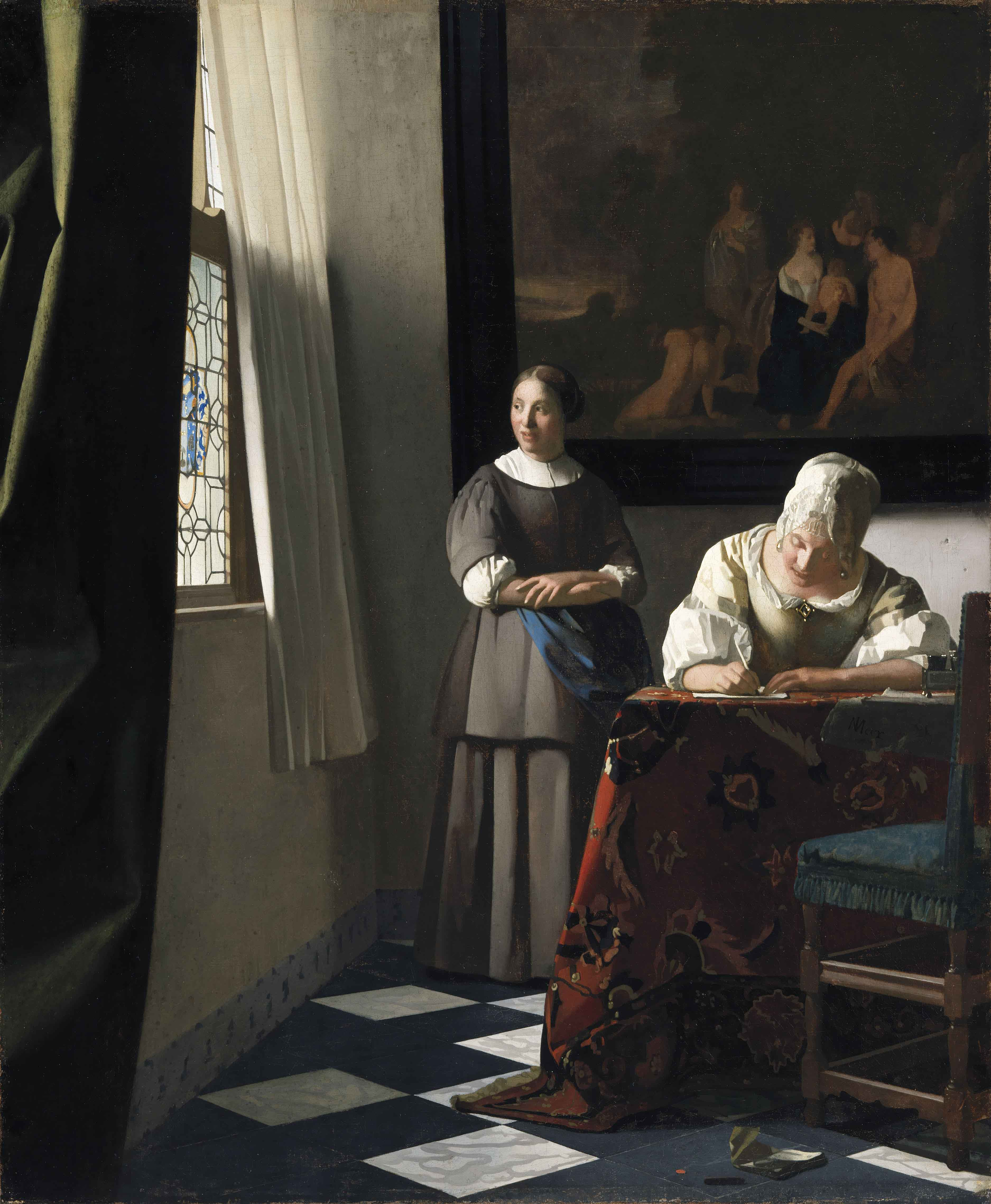
Johannes Vermeer Lady Writing a Letter with her Maid c.1670

- Marinus van Reymerswaele (attributed) (c.1490/95–c.1567) The Calling of Matthew c.1530–40
- Gerrit van Honthorst (1590–1656) A Musical Party c.1616–18
- Rembrandt (and studio) (1606–69) La Main Chaude c.1628
- Willem Cornelisz Duyster (1599–1635) Interior with Soldiers 1632
- Aelbert Cuyp (1620–91) Milking Cows 1640s?
- Matthias Stomer (1600–after 1650) The Arrest of Christ c.1641
- Rembrandt (1606–69) Landscape with the Rest on the Flight into Egypt 1647
- Willem Drost (1652–80) Bust of a Man Wearing a Large-brimmed Hat c.1654
- Anthonie de Lorme (1610–73) Interior of St Laurenskerk, Rotterdam c.1660–65
- Gabriel Metsu (1629–67)
  - Man Writing a Letter c.1663
  - Woman Reading a Letter c.1663
- Jan Steen (1625/26–79)
  - The Village School c.1665
  - The Marriage Feast at Cana 1665–70
- Johannes Vermeer (1632–75) Lady Writing a Letter with her Maid c.1670
- Cornelis Troost (1696–1750) Jeronimus Tonneman and his son Jeronimus 1736
- Nicolaes de Giselaer Interior with Figures
- Emanuel de Witte Church Interior
- Frans Hals Fisher boy with basket

=== British and American ===
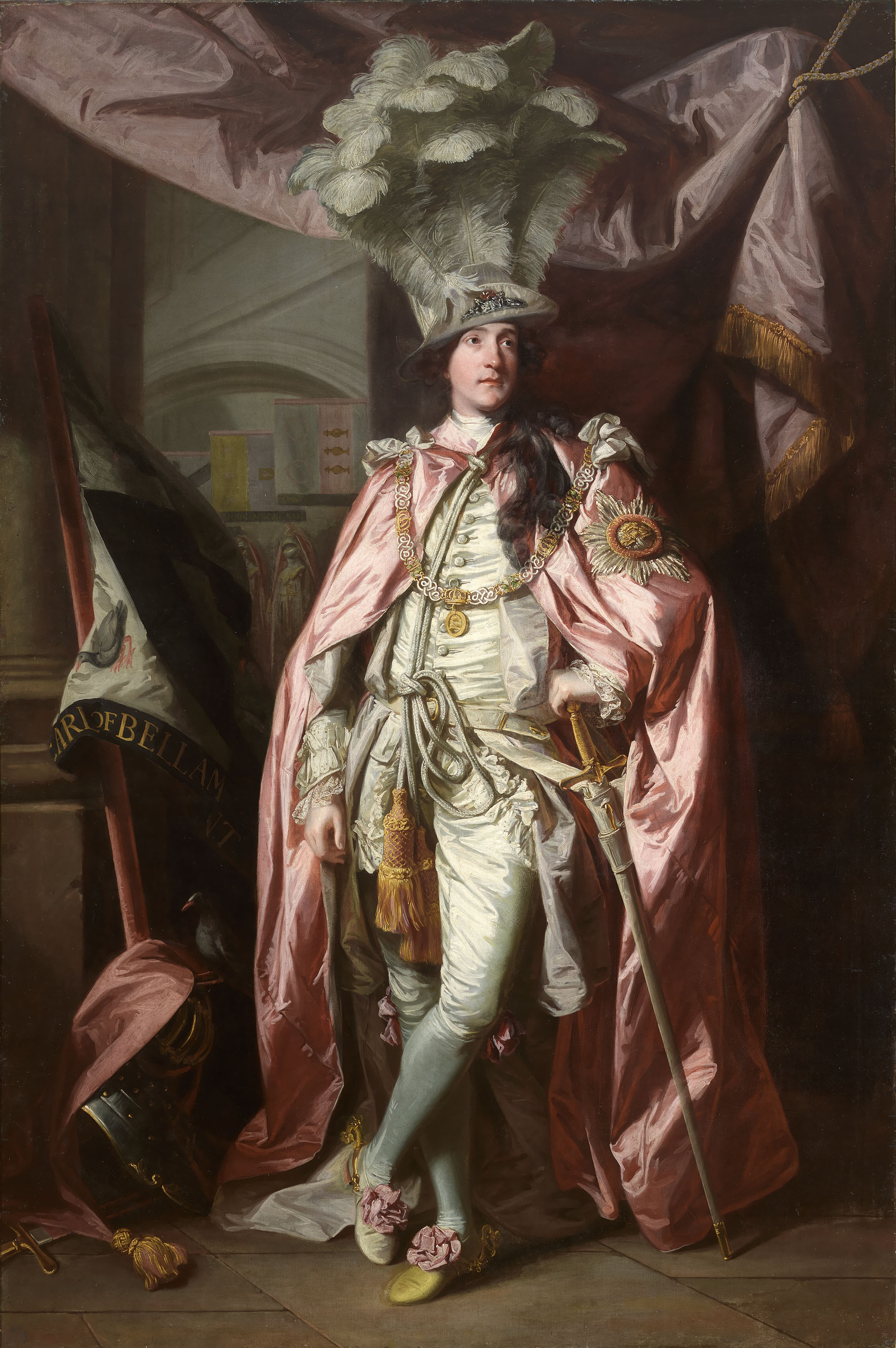
Portrait of the Earl of Bellamont by Joshua Reynolds, 1774

- William Hogarth (1697–1764)
  - The Western Family c.1738
  - The Mackinen Children c.1747
- Thomas Gainsborough 1727–88
  - A view in Suffolk c.1746
  - Mrs Christopher Horton (1743–1808) later Duchess of Cumberland 1766
  - The Cottage Girl 1785
- Joshua Reynolds (1723–92)
  - Parody of Raphael's 'School of Athens' 1751
  - The Temple Family 1780–82
  - Omai 1776 (On loan from a private collection)
  - Portrait of the Earl of Bellamont 1774
- Henry Raeburn (1756–1823) Sir John and Lady Clerk of Penicuik 1791
- George Romney (1734–1802) Titania, Puck and the Changeling, from Shakespeare's 'A Midsummer Night's Dream' 1793
- David Wilkie (1785–1841) Napoleon and Pius VII at Fontainebleau, 1836
- John Singer Sargent (1856–1925) The Bead Stringers of Venice 1880–82
- Stanley Royle (1888–1961) The Goose Girl c.1921
- Francis Wheatley (1747–1801) The Dublin Volunteers on College Green, 4 November 1779 1779–80
- Andrew Festing (1941–present)

=== Irish ===
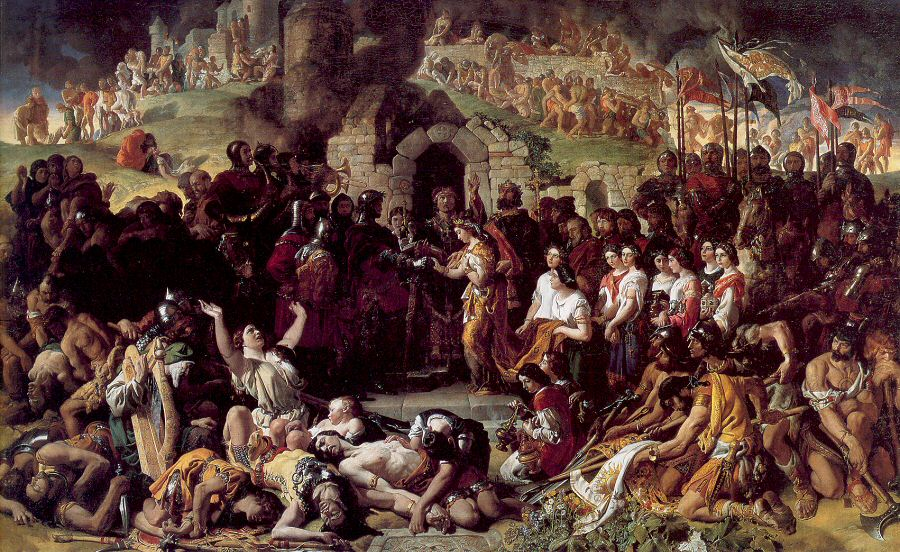
The Marriage of Aoife and Strongbow (1854) by Daniel Maclise, a romanticised depiction of the marriage of Aoife MacMurrough in 1170

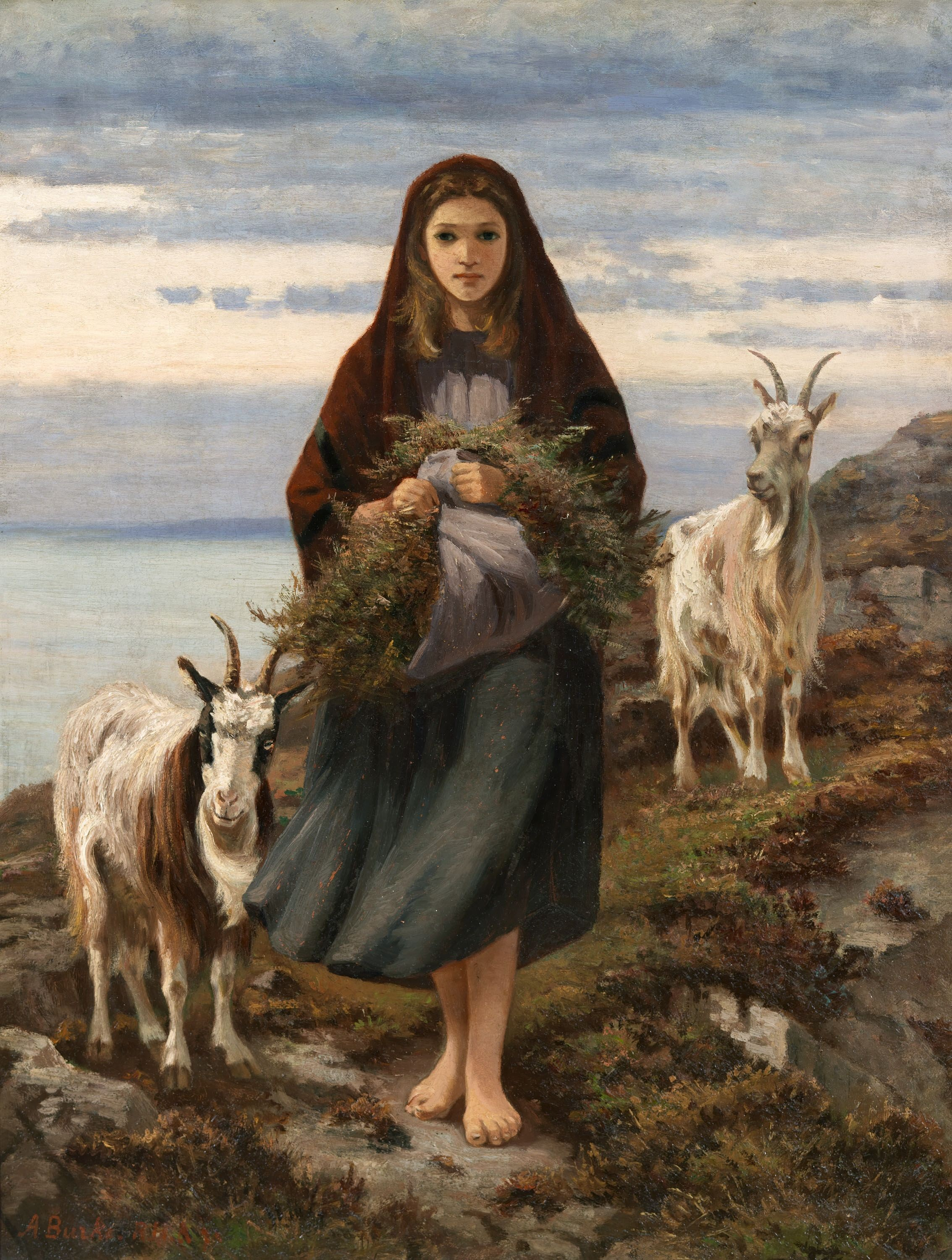
Augustus Nicholas Burke Connemara Girl

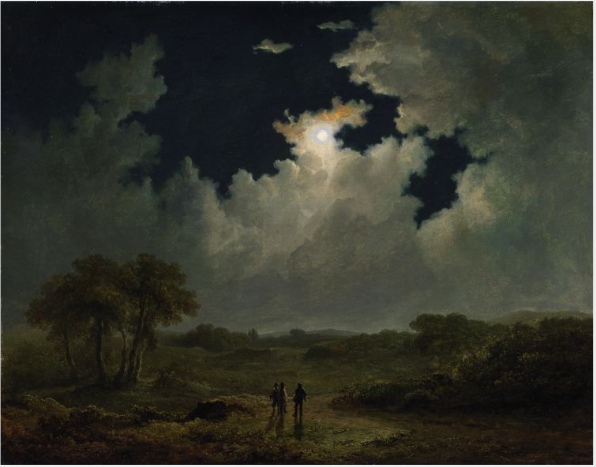
The Poachers by James Arthur O'Connor, 1835

- Kevin Abosch (photographer) (1969) "Portrait of Brian O'Driscoll" 2011
- James Barry (1741–1806)
  - The Temptation of Adam 1767–70
  - Self-portrait as Timanths c.1780–1803
  - The Death of Adonis
- Augustus Nicholas Burke (1838–1891) Connemara Girl (1865).
- Nathaniel Hone the Elder (1718–84) The Conjurer, 1775
- Hugh Douglas Hamilton (1740–1808) Frederick Hervey, Bishop of Derry and Fourth Earl of Bristol (1730–1803), with his Granddaughter Lady Caroline Crichton (1779–1856), in the Gardens of the Villa Borghese, Rome c.1790
- Francis Danby (1793–1861) The Opening of the Sixth Seal, 1828
- Daniel Maclise (1806–1870) The Marriage of Strongbow and Aoife, 1854
- Sarah Purser (1848–1943) Le Petit Dejeuner 1881
- Roderic O'Conor (1860–1940) Le Jeune Bretonne c.1895
- James Arthur O'Connor (1792–1841) The Poachers, 1835
- Walter Osborne (1859–1903) Dublin Streets: a Vendor of Books, 1889, In a Dublin Park, Light and Shade c.1895
- John Lavery (1856–1941) The Artist's Studio: Lady Hazel Lavery with her Daughter Alice and Step-Daughter Eileen 1909–13
- Paul Henry (1876–1958) Launching the Currach 1910–11
- William John Leech (1881–1968) Convent Garden, Brittany c.1912
- Sean Keating (1889–1977) An Allegory c.1922
- Mainie Jellett (1897–1944) Decoration 1923
- Gerard Dillon (1916–1971) The Little Green Fields c.1945
- Louis le Brocquy (1916–2012) A Family 1951
- William Orpen (1878–1931) "Portrait of John Count McCormack" 1923

=== The Yeats Collection ===
- Jack B. Yeats (1871–1957)
  - Bachelor's Walk, in Memory 1915 (On loan from a private collection)
  - The Liffey Swim 1923
  - A Morning in a City 1937
  - Grief 1952
- John Butler Yeats (1839–1922) John O'Leary 1904

=== Drawings and watercolours ===
- James Malton (1760–1803) The Custom House
- Joseph Mallord William Turner (1775–1851)
  - A Ship against the Mewstone, at the Entrance to Plymouth Sound
  - Fishing Boats on Folkestone Beach
- Dante Gabriel Rossetti (1828–82) Jane Burden as Queen Guinevere 1858
- Frederick William Burton (1816–1900) Hellelil and Hildebrand, the Meeting on Turret Stairs, 1864 1864
- James Abbott McNeill Whistler (1834–1903) Nocturne in Grey and Gold – Piccadilly, 1881–83
- Edgar Degas (1834–1917) Two Ballet Dancers in a Dressing Room
- Pablo Ruiz Picasso (1881–1973) Two Dancers 1925

== Zurich Portrait Prize ==
Originally the Hennessy Portrait Prize, the Zurich Portrait Prize is an exhibition of commissioned artists creating works of portraiture. The Prize is open to artists in all mediums who are either citizens in Ireland or Irish citizens living abroad. The prize consists of €15,000 and a €5,000 commission to create a portrait that would be exhibited in the gallery. Previous winners include:

- 2018 Mandy O'Neill
- 2019 Enda Bowe
- 2020 Aidan Crotty
- 2021 Salvatore of Lucan
- 2022 David Booth
- 2023 Ruaidhrí Condon
- 2024 TBC

When it was the Hennessy Portrait Prize, the prize winners were:

- 2014 Nick Miller
- 2015 Vera Klute
- 2016 Gerry Davis
- 2017 Jack Hickey

== Library and archives collections ==
The library and archives collections at the National Gallery of Ireland encompass unique and historically significant collections for the study of art history. The origins of the collections can be traced back to the foundation of the institution over one hundred and sixty years ago. Covering the visual arts from the classical to the contemporary these collections continue to be a vital research element of the National Collection. The development of the library and archive has been supported principally through public funding and the private donations of generous benefactors.

Open to the public, it has particularly rich holdings relating to the history of western European art from the Middle Ages on, and the collections relating to Irish and Italian art are extensive. The collection amounts to over 100,000 published volumes, in addition to significant archival holdings.

== See also ==
- List of national galleries
