= Cornmarket =

Cornmarket may be:

- Cornmarket Group Financial Services Ltd, Ireland
- Cornmarket, Dublin, an area of Dublin city
- Cornmarket Press, the original name of the Haymarket Group when it started in the 1950s
- Cornmarket Street, a shopping street in central Oxford, England
- Corn exchange (as corn market), a building where farmers and merchants historically traded cereal grains.
