= Jacob Ennis =

Irish historical and portrait painter

- Born: 1728; Dublin, Ireland
- Died: 1770 (aged 41–42); Dublin

Jacob Ennis (1728–1770) was an Irish historical and portrait painter. He studied at Dublin under Robert West, and afterwards in Italy. He subsequently became a master in the Dublin Art School.

== Life ==
Jacob Ennis was baptised at St Peter's church, Dublin on 29 February 1728. His parents were James and Margaret Ennis. He attended the Dublin Society school of drawing at George's Lane, training under Robert West. He received premiums in 1747, 1748, and 1750 while a student.

He died, through a fall from his horse, in the county of Wicklow, in 1770.

== Career ==
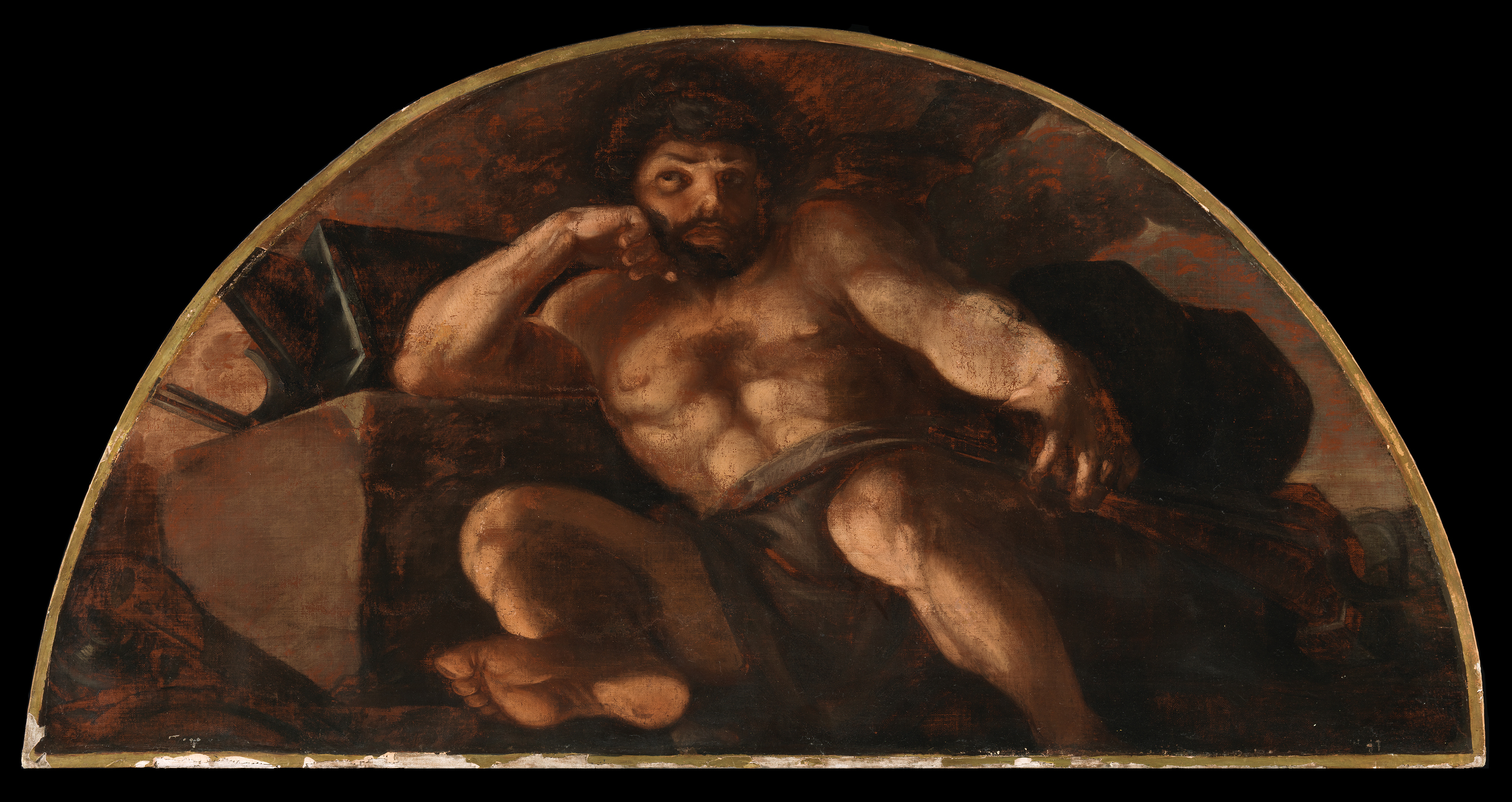
Vulcan Ends the Manufacture of Arms lunette, held in the National Gallery of Ireland

Under the patronage of Arthur Jones Nevill, Ennis travelled to Italy to study, arriving in Rome in late January 1954. While there he shared lodgings with James Forrester and Robert Crone. He studied at Accademia del Nudo in 1755 under Anton Raphael Mengs and Pompeo Batoni, and later visited Florence. At Accademia di San Luca he won 7th prize for painting at the triennial competition in November 1754. In 1755 and 1756, he won 3rd prize in the Concorso Nudo. These drawings are now held in the archive of the Accademia Nazionale di San Luca in Rome. While in Italy, Ennis drew from life and from antique statuary. Ennis visited Gibraltar on his way home to Ireland, and he painted some portraits there.

Having returned to Dublin, Ennis began painting historical subjects and portraits. At the home of Arthur Jones Nevill at 14 Rutland Square, Dublin, Ennis painted a set of 4 lunettes on a ceiling, 3 are now held in the collection of the National Gallery of Ireland. He was appointed to succeed Robert West as master of the school of figure drawing, Shaw's Court, Dublin on 10 May 1763. He exhibited annually with the Society of Artists between 1765 and 1770. He was awarded a premium from Dublin Society in June 1768 for "the best original history piece painted in oil colours", and we won again with Henry Tresham in June 1770.

On 9 August 1770, Ennis received his final payment as the master of figure drawing. After his death, Robert West returned to the position of master in October 1770. West died in November 1770, and was succeeded by his son, Francis Robert West.
