= Halfpenny Bridge (disambiguation) =

Halfpenny Bridge or Ha'penny Bridge may refer to:

- Halfpenny Bridge, over the River Thames at Lechlade, Gloucester, UK
- Halfpenny Bridge, over the River Don, at Tinsley, Sheffield, UK
- Halfpenny Bridge, a pedestrian bridge over the River Avon, at Bath, Somerset, UK, which collapsed in 1877
- Ha'penny Bridge, a pedestrian bridge over the River Liffey in Dublin, Ireland
- Ha'penny Bridge, also known as South Bridge, over the River Hull in Kingston upon Hull
- Ha'penny Bridge, over the River Kelvin in Glasgow, Scotland
- The Ha'Penny Bridge, Dublin is a print of the Ha'penny Bridge in Dublin, by Samuel Frederick Brocas
- Wilford Toll Bridge, over the River Trent in Nottingham
