= Henry Brocas (junior) =

Irish artist

- Born: 1798; Dublin, Ireland
- Died: 1873 (aged 74–75); Dublin
- Family: Henry Brocas (father); James Brocas (uncle); James Henry Brocas (brother); William Brocas (brother); Samuel Frederick Brocas (brother)

Henry Brocas (1798 – 1872) was an Irish artist known for his landscapes and engravings.

== Early life ==
Henry Brocas was born in Dublin in 1798. He was the youngest among the four sons of painter Henry Brocas, whom he trained under.

== Career ==
As an engraver, Brocas collaborated with his brother Samuel on a series of views of Dublin, published around 1820 for which he engraved his brother's drawings. Like his brother William, he also had a series of etchings based on Hogarth's work, and also created some caricatures for McCleary of Nassau Street, Dublin. The frontispiece of the Proceedings of the Royal Irish Academy 1847–50 was his stipple engraved portrait of Richard Kirwan. Between 1828 and 1872 he exhibited 5 or 6 times with the Royal Hibernian Academy, showing primarily oil and watercolour landscapes of County Dublin and north County Wicklow. Brocas produced a painting of the celebrations for the visit of the viceroy Lord Clarendon to Crom castle in 1850.

When his father's health declined, Brocas took over as the master of the Royal Dublin Society's School of Landscape and Ornament temporarily in May 1837. He was replaced by Robert Lucius West in March 1838, and despite resistance from the society's fine art committee, whose preferred candidate was Andrew Nicholl, Brocas was appointed master in May 1838. He was not successful at teaching, and when the Board of Trade started to fund the school in 1849, he was kept as an assistant master but ultimately dismissed in October 1854 when the London-based Department of Science and Art took over administration of the school.

Brocas died in 1873 at his home 120 Lower Baggot Street, Dublin. The British Museum holds a drawing by Brocas, The Phoenix Park.

== Select views of Dublin ==
The engravings were published in the following order:

Order	Illustration	Title	Date	Notes
1		View of the Four Courts, looking down the River Liffey, Dublin		
2		View of the Corn Exchange, Burgh Quay, and Custom House, Dublin		
3		View from Carlisle Bridge, Dublin		
4		View of the Post Office and Nelson's Pillar, Sackville Street, Dublin		
5		View of the Lying-in Hospital and Rutland Square, Dublin		
6		View of the Castle Gate and Royal Exchange, Dublin		
7		View of the Royal Exchange, Dame Street, Dublin		
8		View of the Bank of Ireland, College Green, Dublin		
9		College Green, Dublin		
10		View of the Custom House, from the River Liffey, Dublin		
11		View of the Castle Chapel, Dublin		
12		View of Trinity College from Westmoreland Street, Dublin		
13		The Ha'penny Bridge Bridge Dublin		
14		A view of Bray Head		
15		A view of Dublin from the Phoenix Park		

== See also ==
- A Picturesque and Descriptive View of the City of Dublin
