= John George Mulvany =

Irish painter (1779–1845)

- Portrait of Mulvany by George Francis Mulvany
- Born: 1766; Dublin, Ireland
- Died: 28 September 1838 (aged 71–72); Dublin
- Known for: Painting
- Relatives: Thomas James Mulvany (brother), William Thomas Mulvany (nephew), John Skipton Mulvany (nephew), George Francis Mulvany (nephew)

John George Mulvany (c. 1766–28 September 1838) was an Irish landscape and genre painter, and teacher.

== Life ==
View of Kilmallock

John George Mulvany was born around 1766 in Dublin. His younger brother was Thomas James Mulvany, also a painter. Mulvany's grand niece, Annabella, records that John and Thomas' father died when they were young, and that they was raised by an unidentified Roman Catholic bishop. Like his brother, Mulvany studied at the Dublin Society Schools, winning medals in 1782 and 1786.

Mulvany first exhibited in 1810. As one of the founding members of the Royal Hibernian Academy (RHA) along with his brother, he exhibited with the academy between 1826 and 1837. He was also a successful teacher. His most notable works are two landscapes of Kilmallock, shown at the RHA in 1830 known as The medieval street now held in the National Gallery of Ireland, and The Dominican friary outside the old walls in the collections of the Hunt Museum, Limerick. Both Mulvany brothers painted in a similar style, and rarely signed their work. Many of his works featured castle ruins, peaceful farm animals, and people engaged in work.

A Kitchen Interior

He lived at 4 Paradise Row, and from 1813 on North Richmond Street, Rutland Square. Mulvany died on 28 September 1838 at his home on North Richmond Street. His wife, Mary, died on 23 June 1828, and they are both buried at St Paul's church, North King Street.
