= Solomon Williams =

Irish painter

- Born: 1757; Dublin
- Died: 2 August 1824 (aged 66–67); Dublin
- Occupation: portrait painter

Solomon Williams (1757 - 2 August 1824) was an Irish portrait painter.

== Life ==
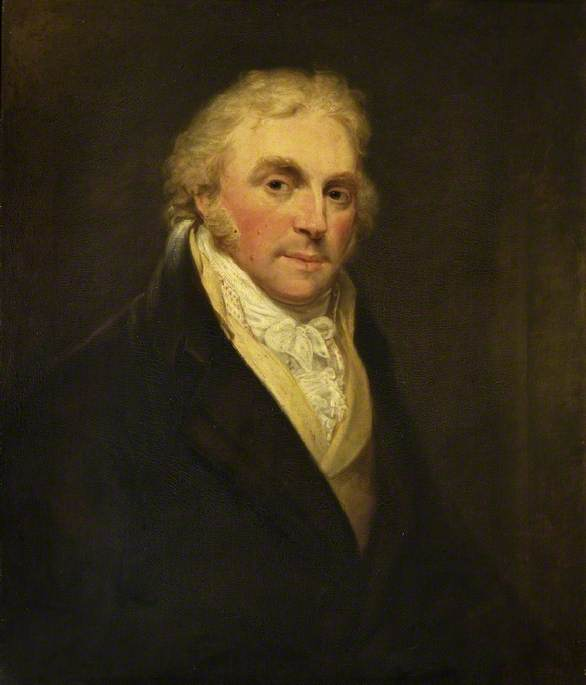
Portrait of Daniel Mesman by Williams held in the Fitzwilliam Museum

Solomon Williams was born in 1757 in Dublin, where his father, Richard Williams was a goldsmith at 6 Castle Street, and later 16 Grafton Street. Williams began his studies at the Dublin Society's Art School in 1771, exhibiting his first piece with the Society of Artists in William Street in 1777 with "Impressions of Seals engraved in the course of six months' practice without instruction" and then in 1780, "Impressions of Seals".

He went on to live in London between 1790 to 1792 and 1796 to 1808. While in London, he exhibited with the Royal Academy and the British Institution. He spent time in Italy, becoming a member of the Accademia Clementina. During his time in Dublin, he lived on Mary Street and Paradise Row, and was commissioned to paint a portrait of "the King" in 1789 for the new audience chamber in Dublin Castle. In the same year he painted a copy of Gainsborough's portrait of the "Marquess of Buckingham, Lord Lieutenant" for the Dublin Corporation.

He returned to live in Dublin permanently from 1809, exhibiting 10 pieces with the Society of Artists in Hawkins Street that year, and exhibited with the Society every year until 1821. He was unsuccessful in his application to replace Francis Robert West as master of the Dublin Society Figure School, also in 1809. In 1823, he was a founding member of the Royal Hibernian Art Society.

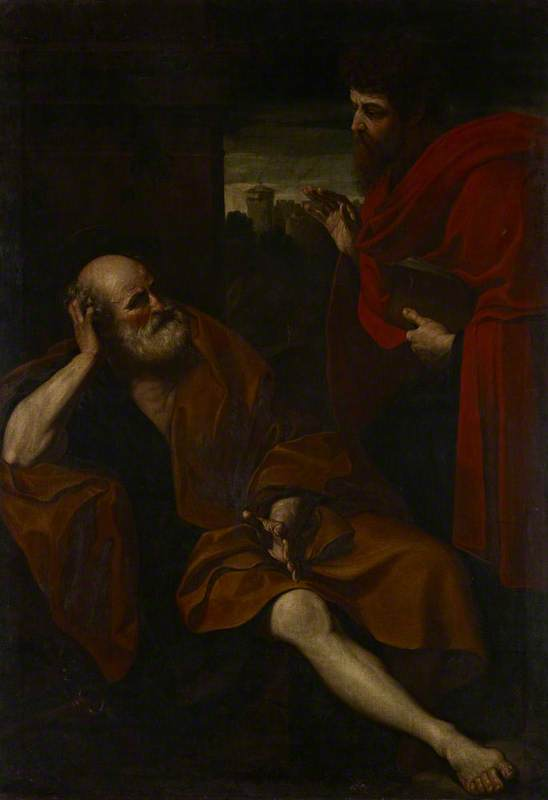
Saints Peter and Paul (after Guido Reni) held by National Galleries of Scotland

With his wide, Sarah, Williams had a son Richard, and five daughters, Mary (born 1788), Deborah, Ellen (or Eleanor, born 1790), Emily and Charlotte (1804-1846). His son was a sculptor, and his daughters were flower painters and drawing teachers. His wife died in Holles Street on 11 August 1837.

== Selected Works ==
- Sir William Alexander, Lord Mayor, Lost in the fire at the City Hall, Dublin, 11 November 1908
- Thomas Pleasants, Royal Dublin Society
- Mrs. Waddington and child
- The Happy Mother (1796)
- Sympathy (1796)
- A Boy and favourite Dog, summer evening (1803)
- A Girl and favourite Dog, winter's evening (1803)
- Trial of Algernon Sydney (1813)
