= James Henry Brocas =

Irish artist

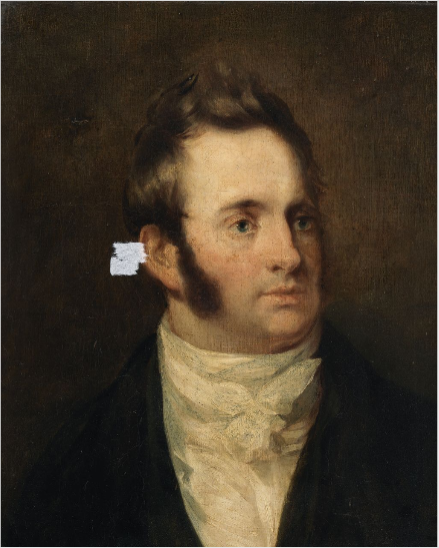
- Portrait of Brocas by Robert Lucius West (1814)
- Born: 1790; Dublin, Ireland
- Died: 14 January 1846 or 1848 (aged 57–58); Cork
- Family: Henry Brocas (father); James Brocas (uncle); Samuel Frederick Brocas (brother); William Brocas (brother); Henry Brocas (junior) (brother)

James Henry Brocas (1790 – 14 January 1846/8) was an Irish artist best known for his landscapes, portraits, and portraits of cattle and horses.

== Early life ==
James Henry Brocas was born in Dublin in 1790. He was the first of the four sons of painter Henry Brocas. He studied at the Dublin Society's School of Figure Drawing, winning prizes in 1802 and 1803, and was awarded a medal for etching.

== Career ==
Brocas contributed etched portraits of cattle to the Dublin Society's Survey of County Dublin in 1802. From 1801 to 1816, his portraits of cattle and horses, as well as landscapes, were exhibited at various times in Dublin, such as at the Royal Irish Institution in 1815. Brocas left Dublin for Cork around 1834. Brocas was featured at the 1845 Society of Artists exhibition on Dame Street, Dublin. In the 1852 Cork Exhibition, his portraits of Thomas Deane and the bishop of Cork, Samuel Kyle were shown.

Brocas died in Cork on 14 January 1846 or 1848. The National Gallery of Ireland holds an 1814 portrait of him by Robert Lucius West.
