= John Skipton Mulvany =

Irish architect

- Born: 1813; Dublin
- Died: 10 May 1870; Dublin, Ireland
- Resting place: Mount Jerome Cemetery and Crematorium
- Occupation: Architect
- Father: Thomas James Mulvany
- Relatives: William Thomas Mulvany (brother), George Francis Mulvany (brother)

John Skipton Mulvany FRIAI (1813 – 10 May 1870) was a notable Irish architect known for his neoclassical railways and religious buildings. Most of the buildings he designed are still in use.

== Early life and family ==
John Skipton Mulvany was born in 1813 in Dublin and was the fourth son of painter Thomas James Mulvany, a founding member of the Royal Hibernian Academy (RHA) along with his brother John George. His mother, Mary (1779-1865) was the daughter of a physician, Dr Cyrus Field. His brothers, William Thomas, became an engineer, George Francis was an artist, Richard Field was a newspaper editor, and Thomas John was also an engineer. He had two sisters, Eliza and Mary.

On 14 April 1846, Mulvany married Eleanor Burke. On 3 of July 1852, Eleanor died of tuberculosis aged 25. The couple had no children, and he never remarried. Mulvany died in May 1870 due to cirrhosis of the liver and was buried at Mount Jerome Cemetery and Crematorium. Fellow architect, Albert Edward Murray remembered Mulvany as "a prodigious smoker of cigars, and very fond of hunting."

== Career ==
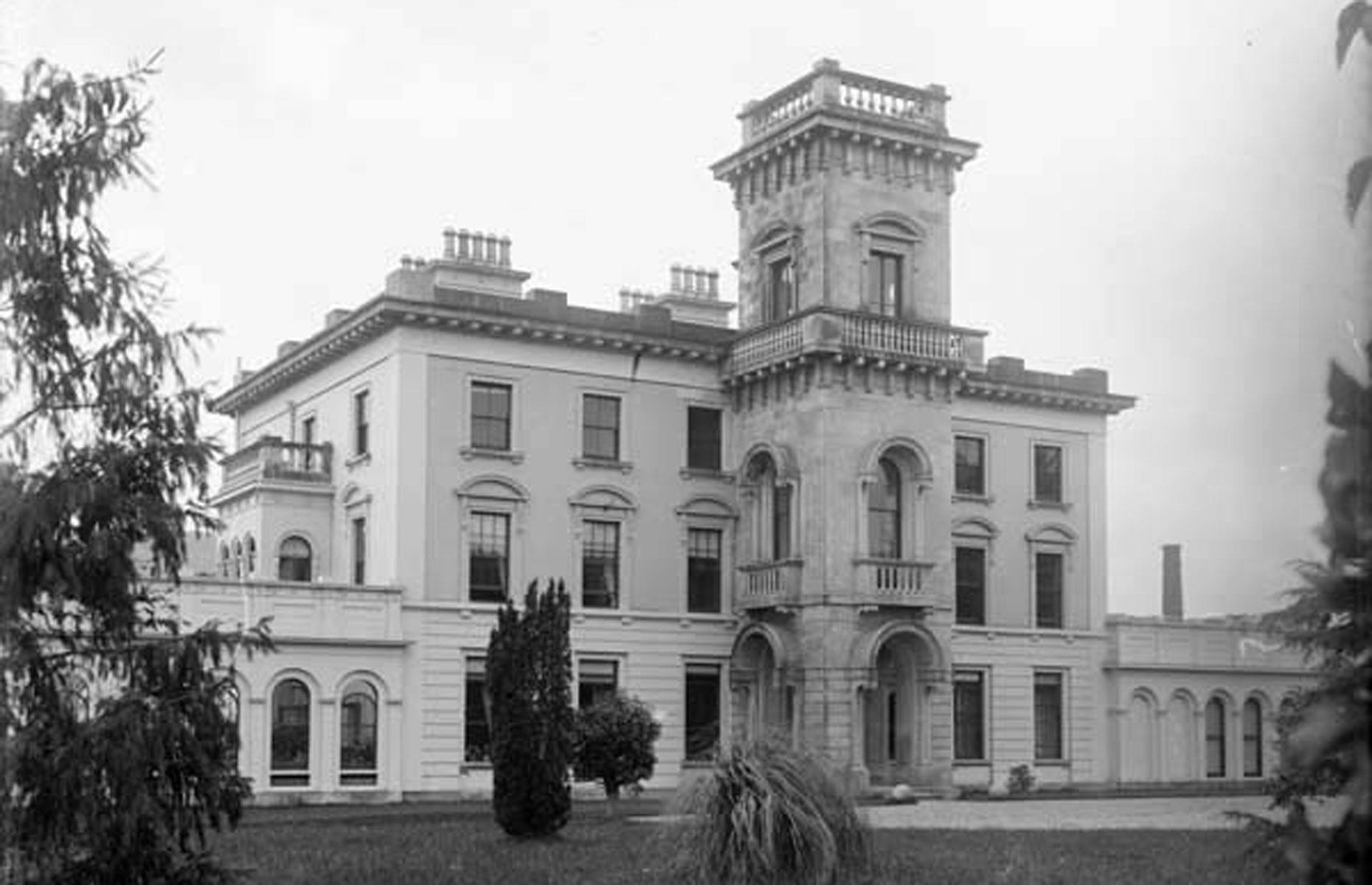
Mayfield House, renovated for the Malcomson family by Mulvany.

Mulvany was an apprentice to architect William Deane Butler, who was responsible for many fine classical courthouses and Gothic churches. Mulvany was a neoclassicist who developed his own personal style, which has been termed 'Graeco-Egyptian'. In September 1833, he exhibited his sketches for the first time at the RHA.

He was later appointed as architect for the Dublin and Kingstown Railway and designed stations along the route. In 1836, he was established in private practice and was commissioned to design an extension for the Salthill Hotel, Monkstown for the railway company.

In 1842, he designed the clubhouse for the Royal Irish Yacht Club and later became the first architect to join the Royal Irish Yacht Club in 1854. In 1845, Mulvany was appointed company director of the Midland Great Western Railway Company, a position he held for five years at a salary of £250. After these five years, he was only paid for specific jobs only. Mulvany designed the Athlone MGWR railway station, Mullingar railway station, and Galway railway station. He also designed railway hotels in Athlone and in Galway, which is now known as The Hardiman. In 1846, he designed the Dublin Broadstone railway station.

He later cultivated people of wealth and influence in Victorian Dublin, mainly Quakers (though he himself was a Roman Catholic), thereby gaining important commissions. Following the death of his father, he moved out of the family house to Brighton Vale, Seapoint. He likely designed the neighbouring buildings. He is said to have designed Longford Terrace and Trafalgar Terrace in Monkstown.

From 1847 to 1855, he had offices at 175 Great Brunswick Street (now Pearse Street). Alfred Gresham Jones was a notable employee of his, who drew three of the four designed exhibited by Mulvany in 1853 at the RHA. In 1850, he was elected Associate at the RHA, and he continued to exhibit his sketches until 1868.

Mulvany was a close friend of William Dargan, and in 1855, he designed a Belvedere tower for Dargan's house, Mount Anville. Mulvany designed Dargan's tomb following his death in 1867.

In 1857, he moved to Sandymount. Later that year, he was commissioned to renovate Mayfield House by the Malcomson family of Portlaw. It was originally designed by architect William Tinsley in 1840. In 1863 he became director of the City of Dublin Steam Packet Company.

In 1864, he designed Woodlock House. He also designed Harold's Cross Episcopal church, and Gigginstown House in Westmeath.

== Legacy ==
In Albert E. Richardson's 1914 book Monumental Classic Architecture in Great Britain and Ireland, the Dublin Broadstone railway station was praised as a building that expressed 'the character of its purpose'.

In 1952, Maurice Craig also praised the Dublin Broadstone railway station: "The Broadstone by John Skipton Mulvany is the last building in Dublin to partake of the sublime ... It stands on rising ground, and the traveller who sees it for the first time, so unexpected in its massive amplitude, feels a little as he might if he were to stumble unawares upon the monstrous silences of Karnak or Luxor."

== See also ==
- Category:John Skipton Mulvany buildings
