= Tivoli Variety Theatre =

Former theatre in Dublin, Ireland

- Conciliation Hall, Grand Lyric Hall, Lyric Theatre of Varieties
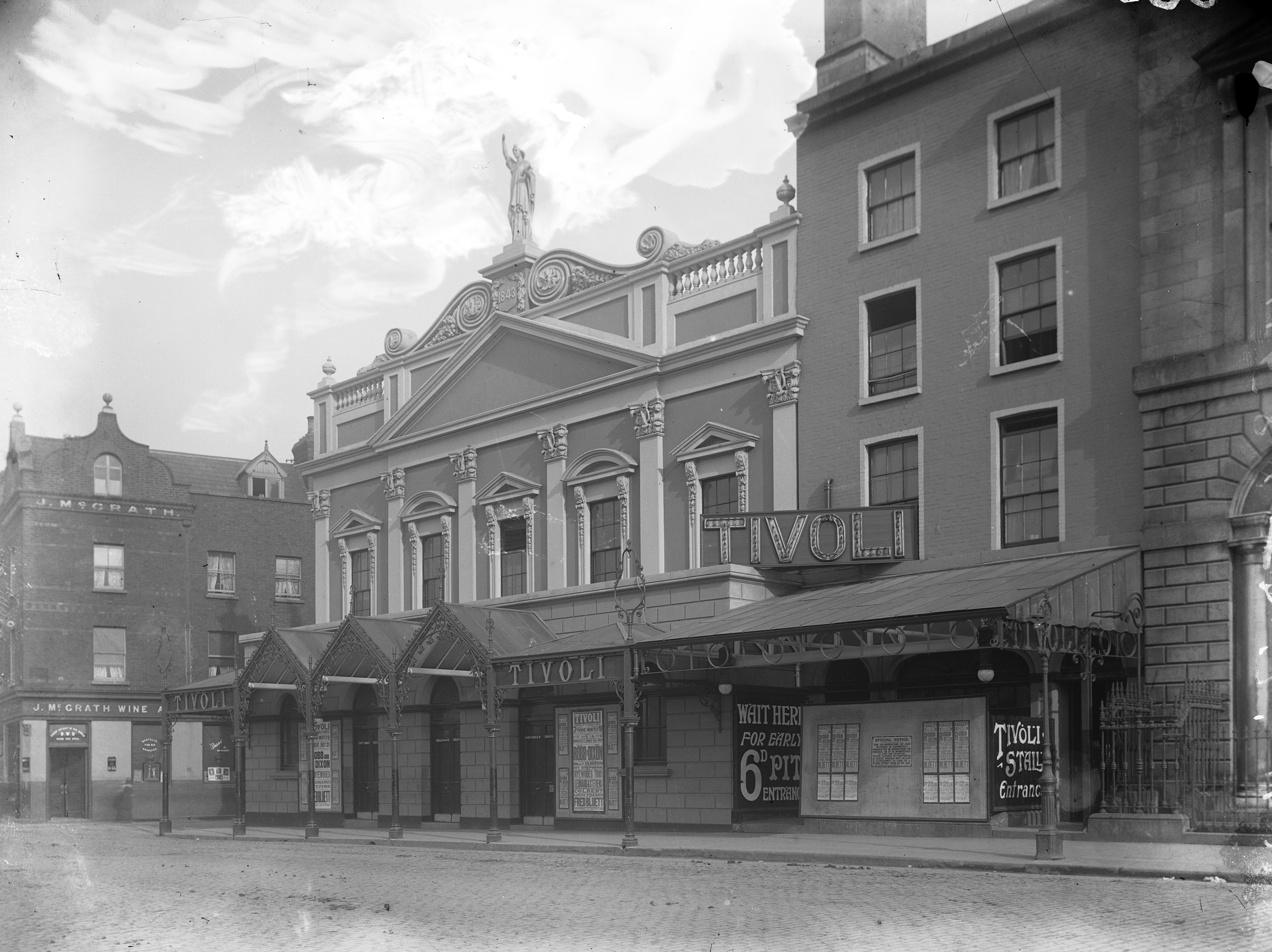
- The Tivoli c.May 1915
- Address: Burgh Quay; Dublin 2 Ireland
- Owner: W.H. Byrne
- Capacity: 1,252
- Type: theatre, concert hall

Construction
- Opened: 1834
- Closed: 1928
- Architect: Peter Martin

The Tivoli Variety Theatre in Dublin, Ireland, started life as the Conciliation Hall in 1834. Located on Burgh Quay, Dublin 2; It was built as a meeting place for Daniel O'Connell's Repeal Association.

In 1897, it was rebuilt as a concert hall called the Grand Lyric Hall and changed its name to the Lyric Theatre of Varieties the following year. It became known as the Tivoli in 1901. It was a modest-sized music hall with seating for 1252 patrons.

The Tivoli closed in 1928 but for a short time continued to show cine-variety on Sunday nights. It finally closed in 1930, and the building became the home of the Irish Press newspaper group.

A replacement Tivoli Theatre opened elsewhere in the city in 1934 and closed in 2019.

== See also ==
- Corn Exchange, Dublin
