= Cornmarket Group Financial Services =

Irish financial services company

Cornmarket Group Financial Services Ltd is an investment and insurance brokerage company based in Ireland. Over the years, Cornmarket expanded their product range to provide financial services and car insurance, income protection, retirement planning, home and health insurance to teachers, nurses, and other public sector employees.

Formerly Woodchester Brokers, it was founded in 1972 as Savings & Investments Ltd. It was acquired by Irish Life and Permanent in 1999.

The head office is in Dublin, Ireland.

The company is named for the area of Dublin in which the original offices were located in Dublin 8 close to the old Corn Exchange.
