= Samuel Frederick Brocas =

Irish artist

- Born: c. 1792; Dublin, Ireland
- Died: 14 May 1847 (aged 54–55); Dublin
- Family: Henry Brocas (father); James Brocas (uncle); James Henry Brocas (brother); William Brocas (brother); Henry Brocas (junior) (brother)

Samuel Frederick Brocas (c. 1792 – 14 May 1847) was an Irish artist best known for his series depicting Dublin known as the Select views of Dublin.

== Early life ==
Samuel Frederick Brocas was born in Dublin around 1792. He was the second of the four sons of the painter Henry Brocas. From 1803 to 1807, Brocas studied under his father at the Dublin Society Schools. During this time, he won medals for flower painting in 1801, etching in 1802 and figure drawing in 1807. He was best known for his topographical views and landscapes in oils and watercolours, working mostly in Dublin, and in Limerick at times.

== Career ==
Brocas was exhibited in Dublin in 1804, 1809 and 1812. The Royal Hibernian Academy (RHA) exhibited his landscapes for the first time in 1828, with pieces depicting the north of Wales, and he continued to exhibit with the RHA until 1847. His best-known set of works is his 12 views of Dublin city from 1817. These were engraved by his brother Henry, and printed by J. Le Petit of Dublin between 1818 and 1829, entitled Select views of Dublin. They were planned to be part of a book, Book of views of Ireland, but this was never published. From his address, 15 Henry Street, Dublin, where Brocas lived with his father, he published the folio lithograph he produced, King John's Castle Limerick, in 1826. A view of Trinity College and the east portico of the Bank of Ireland is another of the lithographs he produced and published in Dublin. He was also a member of the Society of Artists.

He died at his home, 120 Lower Baggot Street, Dublin, on 14 May 1847. The National Gallery of Ireland holds a number of works by him, including two watercolours depicting views of Dublin. The V&A Museum and the British Museum each hold two paintings by him.

== Select views of Dublin ==
Order	Illustration	Title	Date	Notes
1		View of the Four Courts, looking down the River Liffey, Dublin	c1817	
2		View of the Corn Exchange, Burgh Quay, and Custom House, Dublin	c1817	
3		View from Carlisle Bridge, Dublin	c1817	
4		View of the Post Office and Nelson's Pillar, Sackville Street, Dublin	c1817	
5		View of the Lying-in Hospital and Rutland Square, Dublin	c1817	
6		View of the Castle Gate and Royal Exchange, Dublin	c1817	
7		View of the Royal Exchange, Dame Street, Dublin	c1817	Prior to the setting out of Lord Edward Street in the late 19th century.
8		View of the Bank of Ireland, College Green, Dublin	c1817	
9		College Green, Dublin	c1817	Includes a clear view of Daly's Club
10		View of the Custom House, from the River Liffey, Dublin	c1817	
11		View of the Castle Chapel, Dublin	c1817	
12		View of Trinity College from Westmoreland Street, Dublin	c1817	
		The Ha'penny Bridge Bridge Dublin	c1820	Not part of the Select views of Dublin series
		A view of Bray Head	c1820	Not part of the Select views of Dublin series
		A view of Dublin from the Phoenix Park	c1820	Not part of the Select views of Dublin series

== See also ==
- James Malton
