= Waterford Steamship Company =

- House flag
- Industry: Shipping
- Founded: 1836
- Founder: Joseph Malcolmson
- Defunct: 1912
- Successor: Clyde Shipping Company
- Headquarters: Waterford
- Area served: Waterford, Liverpool, Bristol

The Waterford Steamship Company provided shipping services between Waterford and Bristol and Liverpool from 1836 to 1912.

== History ==
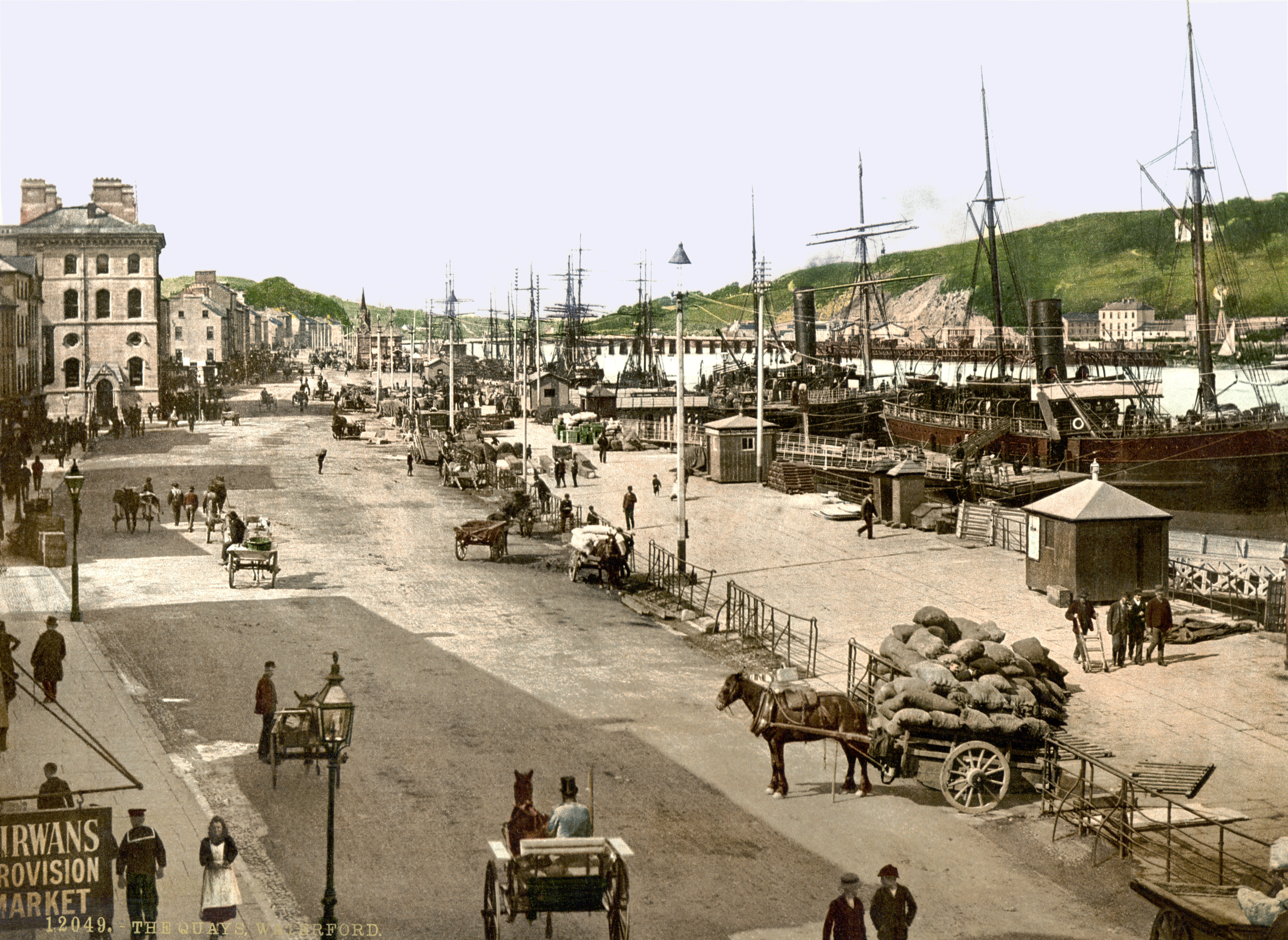
Waterford Quay between ca. 1890 and ca. 1900

The Waterford Steamship Company ran 13 steamers to Bristol, Liverpool, and Irish ports. Services had been operating before 1836, but it was reorganized and registered as a new company this year.

In 1870 the services operated from Waterford to London were taken over by the British and Irish Steam Packet Company.

In 1901, in a heavy fog, RMS Oceanic of the White Star Line was involved in a collision when she rammed and sank the small Waterford Steamship Company ship SS Kincora, killing 7 people.

It was absorbed by the Clyde Shipping Company in 1912.
