= Solomon Delane =

Irish landscape painter

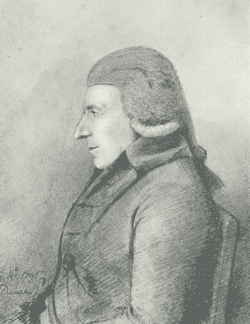
Solomon Delane; chalk drawing by George Dance the Younger (1795)

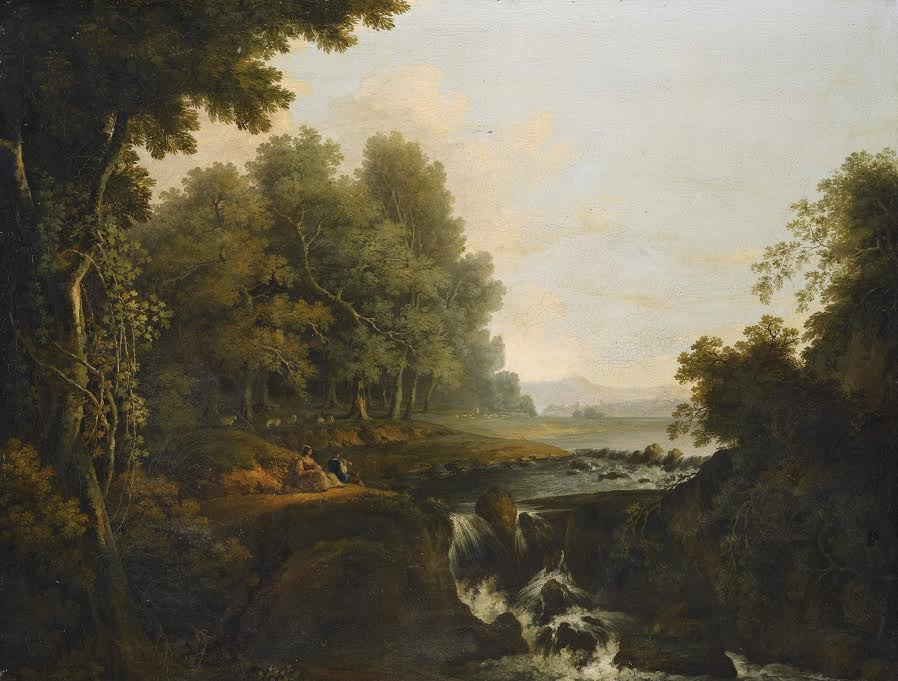
Wooded Landscape with Waterfall

Solomon Delane, or Delaney (c.1727 in County Tipperary – 1812 in Dublin) was an Irish landscape painter who spent a major part of his career in Italy. Some earlier sources give his place of birth as Edinburgh, which may be related to the political and religious unrest in Ireland during his later years.

== Biography ==
His father, Richard, was a clergyman. He was sent away to attend school in Dublin. In addition to the standard courses, he worked with Robert West and studied at the School of Landscape and Ornament, operated by the Royal Dublin Society. His primary instructor there was James Mannin (?-1779) a landscape and flower painter of French origin. In 1750, he won a prize from the Academy and was given a second-place order of merit. His first known work was a portrait of Isaac Sparks (1719-1776), a popular comedian known as the "Right Comical Chief Joker", who held mock trials. Little else is known from his Dublin period.

Within the next two years, both his father and his older brother, George, died, leaving him a comfortable income and several properties.

He decided to travel and arrived in Italy around 1755, where he was a resident of Rome for fifteen years; occasionally sharing accommodations with his fellow landscape painter, Hugh Primrose Dean (?-1784). In 1763, he sent a large landscape to London for an exhibition at Spring Gardens and was named a member of the short-lived Society of Artists of Great Britain. In 1771, he sent two works to an exhibition at the Royal Academy. He continued to participate by long-distance in all the major exhibitions until 1777, when he was elected to the Accademia delle Arti del Disegno of Florence. Many of his works were falsely attributed to Claude Lorrain.

After that, he took a painting tour to Germany, in the company of Duke Aubrey Beauclerk and his wife, Lady Catherine. He briefly took up residence in Augsburg, then went to London and exhibited two scenes of the Alps at the Academy.

In 1784, he returned to Dublin, married Elizabeth Warburton (?-1806), with whom he may have had three children, and appears to have retired from public life, although he participated in two minor exhibitions (1802 and 1812). He was also appointed Cork Herald of Munster (a largely ceremonial title) in 1797.
