= Robert Crone (artist) =

Irish landscape painter

Robert Crone (c. 1718 - 1779) was an Irish landscape painter.

== Life ==
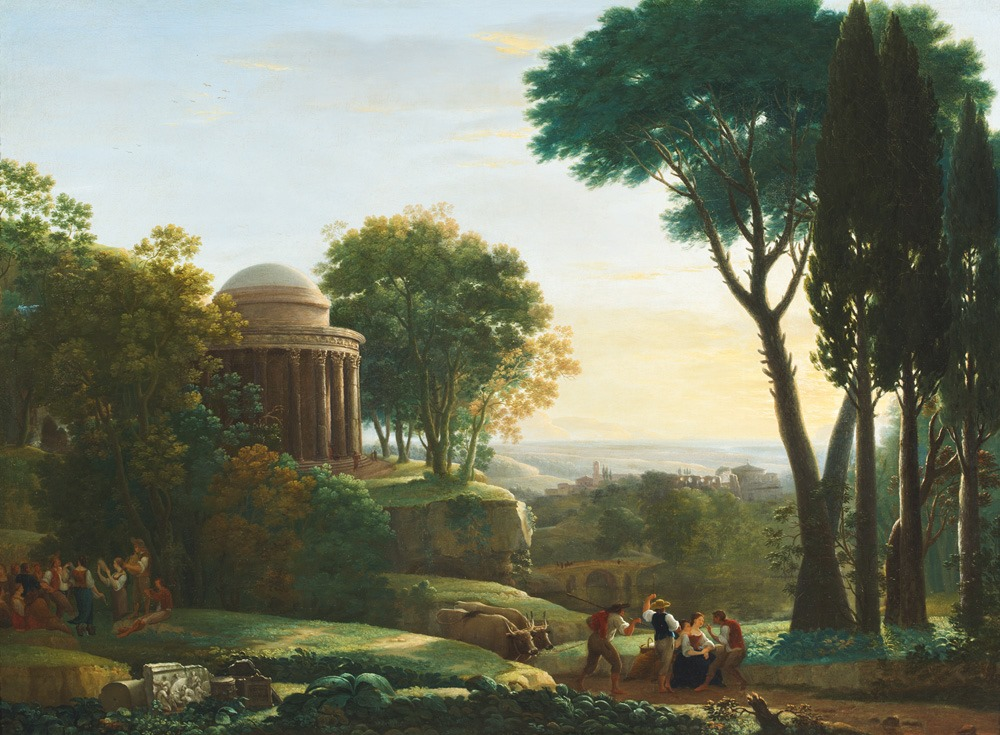
A Landscape and Figures (1770) by Crone

Crone was born in Dublin around 1718. He initially trained at the Dublin Society's drawing school under Robert West on George's Lane, winning prizes in 1748 and 1750. He then went on to become a pupil of the portrait painters, Robert Hunter and Philip Hussey. Crone moved away from portraiture and commenced painting landscapes, in which he achieved considerable success. Hussey was a relative, and he sent Crone to Italy around 1750, where he studied under Richard Wilson in Rome. While there he an associate of the Irish artists James Forrester and Solomon Delane. James Martin noted in his journal that Crone "has chiefly studied Claude Lorrain and I believe is reckoned to have a good Deal of his Manner".

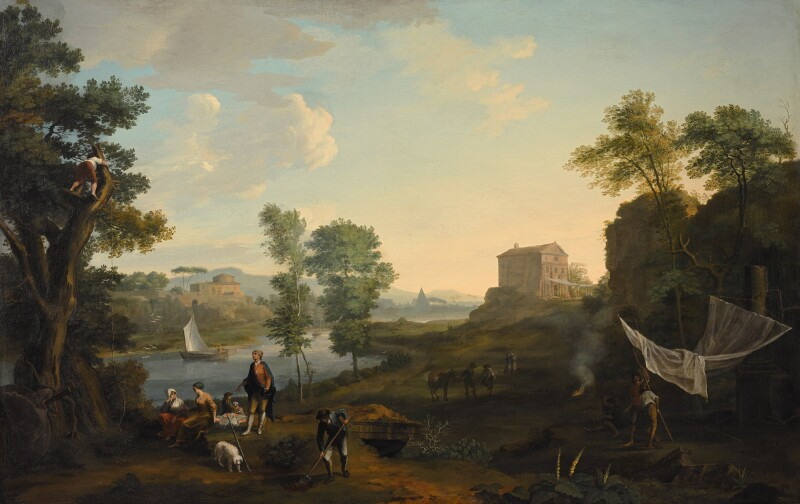
Landscape Crone undated

Crone remained in Rome until 1767. The next year he was in London, where he showed two drawings at the Society of Arts. From 1772 until 1778 he exhibited annually at the Royal Academy. Although much hindered by frequent epileptic fits, and he has also been described as small in stature and "deformed". His first exhibited pictures were two landscapes called Morning and Evening. The only work he exhibited in Dublin was with the Irish Society of Artists in 1770 with Landscape and Figures. He exhibited drawings, some of which were finished after Richard Wilson's style in black and white chalk on a bluish-grey paper. His landscapes are now very scarce and much sought after; a few examples are in the Royal Collection.

He died in London in 1779 after a seizure.
