= Robert Lucius West =

Irish artist

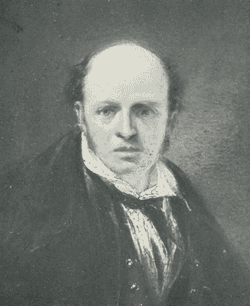
- Self portrait
- Born: circa 1774; Dublin, Ireland
- Died: 24 January 1850 (aged 75–76); Dublin
- Father: Robert West (painter)

Robert Lucius West (circa 1774 - 24 January 1850) was an Irish artist, draughtsman and teacher.

== Life and family ==
Robert Lucius West was born around 1774 in Dublin. His parents were artist Francis Robert and his second wife Ellen West (née Walsh). West's grandfather was Robert West the artist and master of the Dublin Society figure school, a position his father also held. West studied under his father at that school, and was awarded prize medals in 1795 and 1796.

West does not appear to have married. He died on 3 June 1850 and is buried in Mount Jerome cemetery.

== Career ==
West's first exhibited works were two paintings, Portrait of a gentleman and Portrait of a young lady, with the Society of Artists of Ireland in 1800. By this time he was working as an assistant with his father at the drawing school. He exhibited more paintings with the Society in 1801 and 1802. His portrait of John Foster in 1807 won a prize of 50 guineas from the Society, and West used this money to travel to London to study further. He exhibited with the Royal Academy in 1808, and when he returned to Dublin in 1809, he was officially appointed as assistant to his father at the figure school.

When his father died in 1809, West volunteered to run the school until a replacement was found, but West expected to succeed his father and grandfather. The Dublin Society's committee was determined to find a new, more technically proficient master, and decided on the artist George Grattan. The committee were unanimous in the selection of Grattan, but the Dublin Society's membership voted to offer the position to West 67 votes to 29. He was confirmed the new master, and Grattan received 100 guineas.

He continued to exhibit with a number of societies including the Artists of Ireland, the Hibernian Society of Artists, the Irish Society of Artists, and the Cork Society for Promoting the Fine Arts. At this point, West began to specialise in portraits, specifically military portraiture. Examples of his works include Portrait of an officer of the 14th Light Dragoons (1809) and Portrait of Captain Hemmings, 58th Regiment (1811). He was a founding member of the Royal Hibernian Academy (RHA) in 1823, exhibiting a number of paintings at their first exhibition in 1826. At this point, West was also painting religious subjects such as The crucifixion (1826), and The assumption of the Virgin (1828). He was a regular exhibitor with the RHA for the rest of his career.

As early as 1830, the Royal Dublin Society committee of fine arts complained of West's irregular manner of running the figure school, censuring his work as below standard in 1830. He briefly replaced Henry Brocas as master of landscape and ornament in 1838, until Brocas' son, Henry, succeeded his father. By this point, it was widely accepted that West's father was a superior draughtsman, and by 1845, West's success was faltering. He asked to retire in January 1845, and he was secured a pension of £60. Following his retirement he exhibited at the RHA, but his paintings were not well received. In 1846, the Art Union stated that "a timely retirement would be judicious".

== Selected works ==
- Portrait of John Philpot Curran (1827)
- Portrait of a Highland officer (1831)
- The ancient gateway at Glendalough (1846)
- Dunbrody abbey, Wexford (1848)
