= Tivoli Theatre (Dublin) =

Theatre in The Liberties, Dublin, Ireland

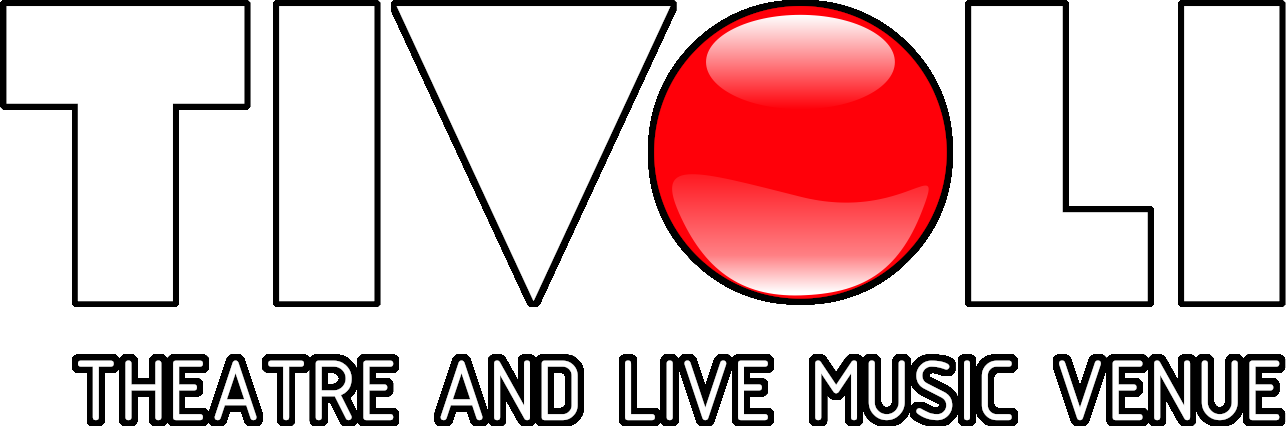
- The final logo of the theatre before its destruction in 2019

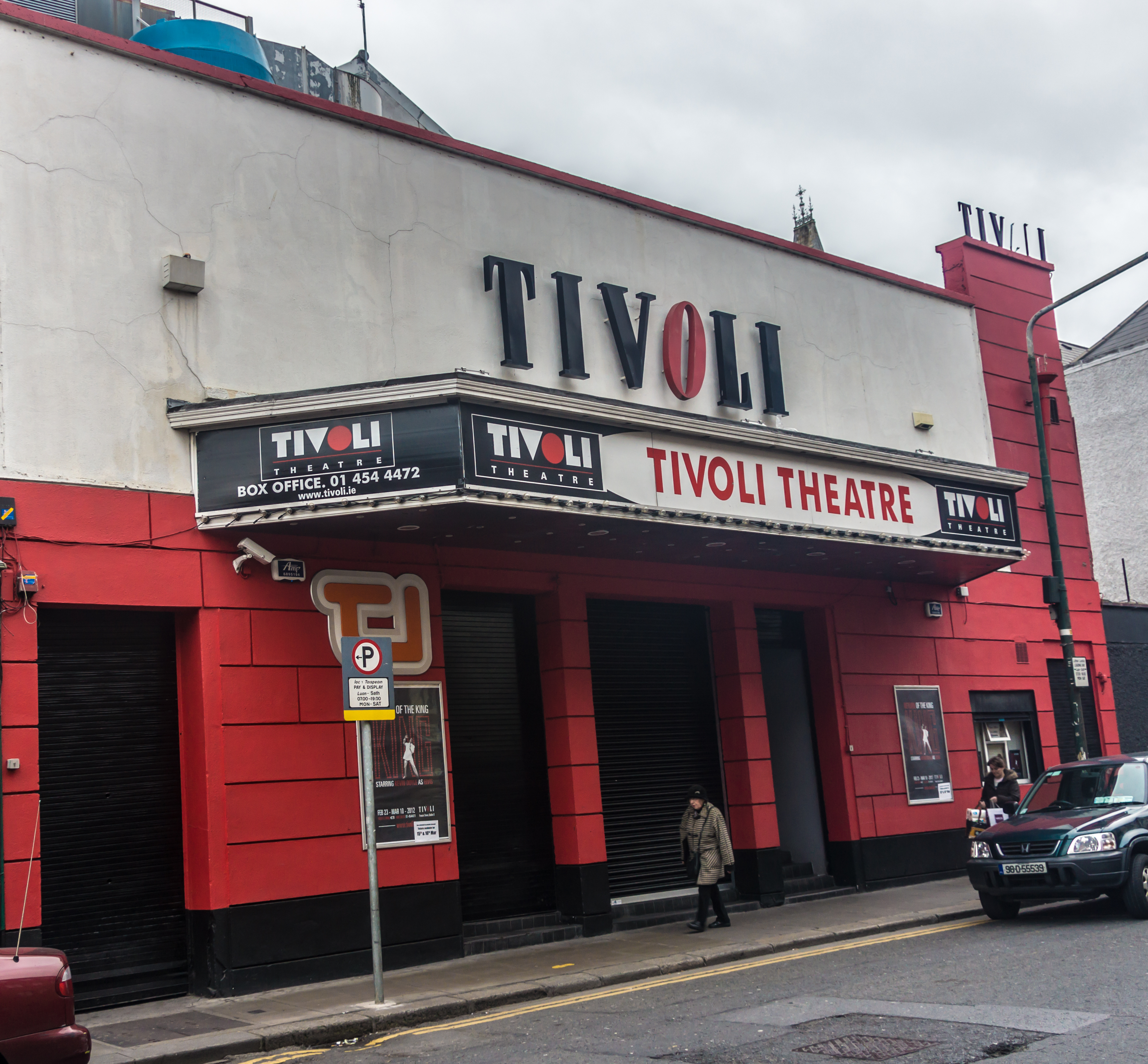
- The Tivoli Theatre in 2012
- Interactive map of Tivoli Theatre
- Former names: Tivoli Cinema
- Address: 135 Francis St, The Liberties, Dublin 8, Dublin; Ireland
- Coordinates: 53°20′32″N 06°16′35″W
- Owner: Anthony "Tony" Byrne
- Capacity: Upstairs: 475 (seated); Downstairs: 1000 (standing)
- Events: Cinéma; Nightclub; Theatre

Construction
- Opened: 21 December 1934
- Renovated: 1987
- Closed: 2019
- Demolished: 2019
- Years active: 1934 to September 1964; 1987 to 2019
- Architect: Vincent Kelly

Website
- https://www.tivoli.ie/ (defunct)

The Tivoli Theatre was a theatre on Francis Street in The Liberties, Dublin which opened in 1934 and operated until 2019 when it was demolished and replaced by "StayCity Aparthotel Tivoli", a 4-star hotel.

== History ==
The theatre opened on 21 December 1934 as a replacement for an earlier Tivoli Theatre located on Burgh Quay, which had closed in May 1928. Built to the designs of architect Vincent Kelly with seating provided for 700. The Tivoli Theatre opened as a cine-variety theatre, but by the late-1930s it had converted to full-time cinema use and was renamed Tivoli Cinema.

The Tivoli Cinema was closed in September 1964 following a fire. It remained derelict for several years until purchased by former footballer Anthony "Tony" Byrne, who converted the cinema into a theatre and music venue at a cost of roughly £250,000. Byrne placed a theatre on the first floor with 560 seats and a music venue on the ground floor with a capacity for 1,000 people (standing). Following this refurnishment, the venue reopened in 1987 and was renamed Tivoli Theatre. At the time of closing, the upper theatre could seat 475, and the lower venue was in operation as a nightclub called "District 8".

The walls of the car park had become a noted street art location and the planning permission to demolish the theatre required the extant art to be photographed and documented before demolition.

The theatre was demolished and replaced by apartments and a hotel in early 2019. One of the conditions for planning permission set by Dublin City Council was that the premise would retain a "performance and exhibition space" where entertainers and artists could continue to perform. However, after the new site's construction, news media in 2023 reported that the area was used for little more than storage space.

== Notable Performances ==
The venue hosted musical performances by The Cranberries, Oasis, Blur, Sinéad O'Connor, Suede, The Beastie Boys, Rage Against the Machine, Deadmau5, Perfume Genius, and $uicideBoy$.

That Petrol Emotion played the Tivoli three times, including their Irish farewell gig in 1994. Recordings from that concert were included on the live album Final Flame (Fire, Detonation And Sublime Chaos).

From October 2014 until October 2018, the Tivoli Theatre was the primary venue of Irish professional wrestling promotion Over the Top Wrestling.
