= Thomas James Mulvany =

Irish painter (1779–1845)

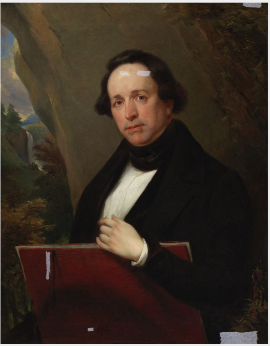
- Portrait of Mulvany by George Francis Mulvany
- Born: 1779; Dublin, Ireland
- Died: 1845 (aged 65–66); Booterstown, Dublin
- Resting place: Mount Jerome Cemetery and Crematorium
- Known for: Painting
- Children: William Thomas Mulvany, John Skipton Mulvany, George Francis Mulvany

Thomas James Mulvany (1779–1845) was an Irish painter and the first keeper of the Royal Hibernian Academy.

== Life ==
Thomas James Mulvany was born in Dublin in 1779. He studied at the Dublin Society Schools under Francis Robert West. He worked as a miniaturist at first, but then established himself as a landscape and portrait painter. Mulvany's grand daughter, Annabella, records that Thomas' father died when he was very young, and that he was raised by a Roman Catholic bishop along with his brother.

Mulvany was an exhibitor with the Dublin Society of Artists, at the rooms of the Dublin Society in Hawkins Street, Dublin, in May 1809. When the Dublin Society disposed of their premises in 1819, the artists were left without a place for exhibition. Mulvany, together with his brother, John George (also a painter), was active in advocating for a charter of incorporation to the artists of Ireland. A charter was obtained in 1823 and the Royal Hibernian Academy founded under the presidency of Francis Johnston. Mulvany and his brother were two of the 14 academics first elected.

Subsequently Mulvany became keeper of the Academy in 1841. He died on 27 February 1845 at his home, Dirker Lodge, Cross Avenue, Booterstown. He is buried at Mount Jerome cemetery.

== Works ==
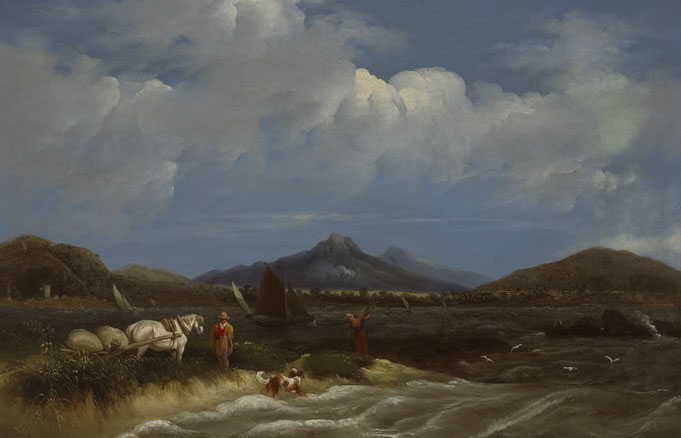
County Wicklow landscape by Thomas James Mulvany

Mulvany wrote for The Citizen on Irish artists. During the last years of his life, Mulvany was employed in editing the Life of James Gandon. The book was published in 1846. It was based on papers of James Gandon the younger, and Maurice James Craig also edited the work.

== Family ==
Mulvany married Mary Field, and they had seven children, the eldest being William Thomas. Their son George Francis (1809–1869), also practised as a painter. He succeeded his father as keeper of the Royal Hibernian Academy, and in 1854 he was elected the first director of the newly founded National Gallery of Ireland. The fourth son John Skipton was known as an architect. Thomas John became an engineer and worked with his brother, William, and Richard Field became a news paper editor. They had two daughters, Eliza and Mary.

== Notes ==
Attribution

This article incorporates text from a publication now in the public domain: Lee, Sidney, ed. (1894). "Mulvany, Thomas James". Dictionary of National Biography. Vol. 39. London: Smith, Elder & Co.
