= Wellington Street, Dublin =

Street in Dublin, Ireland

Wellington Street
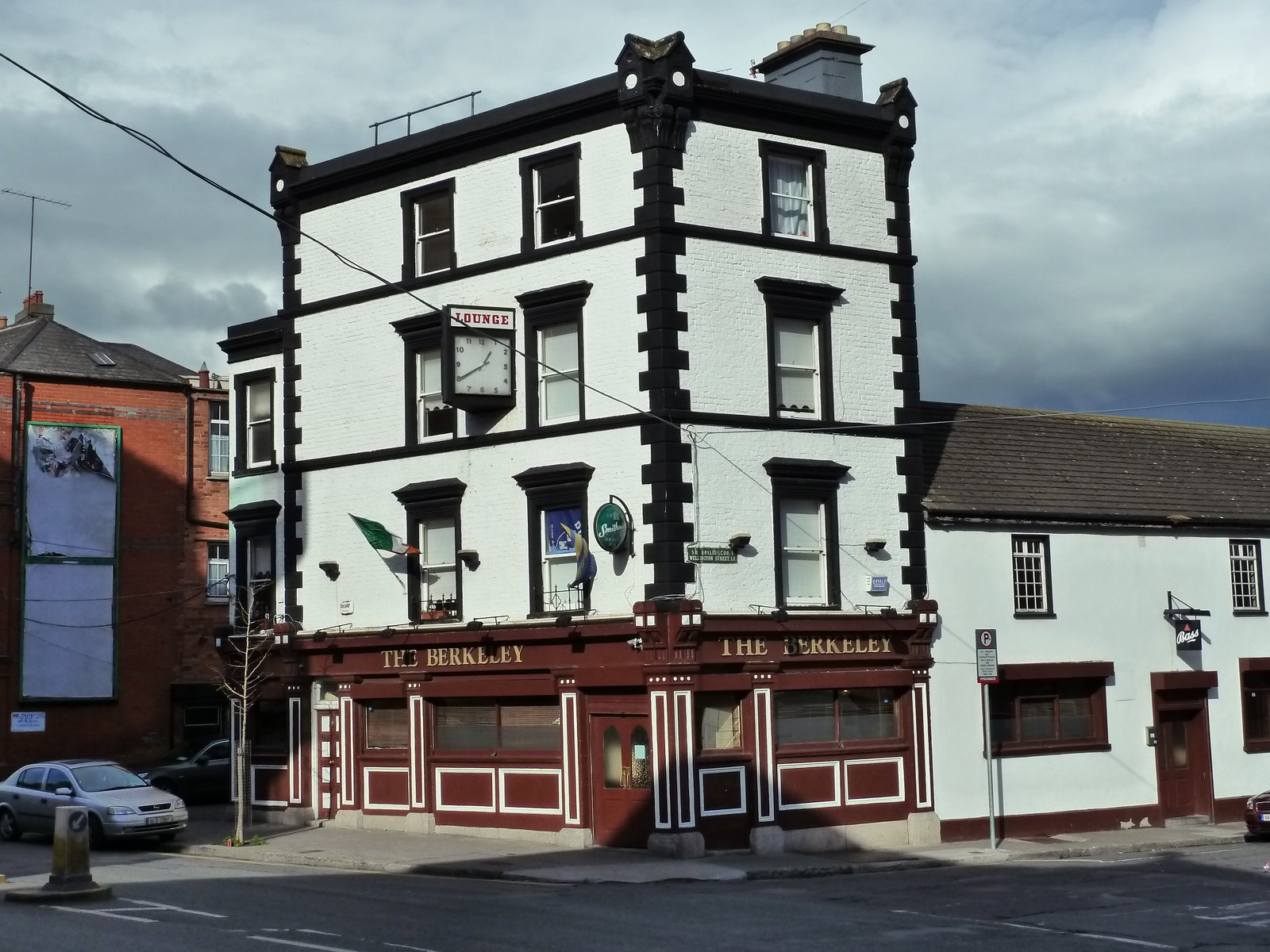
- The Berkeley pub on the corner of Wellington Street and Mountjoy Street
- Interactive map of Wellington Street
- Native name: Sráid Wellington (Irish)
- Former name: Paradise Row
- Location: Dublin, Ireland
- Postal code: D07
- Coordinates: 53°21′22″N 6°16′04″W
- east end: Dorset Street
- Major junctions: Mountjoy Street
- west end: Primrose Street

Wellington Street (Irish: Sráid Wellington) is a street in Dublin divided into Wellington Street Upper and Wellington Street Lower. The street connects Dorset Street to the east and Primrose Street to the west. Mountjoy Street runs through the intersection of the Upper and Lower sections of the street.

Wellington Place North runs parallel one street over.

== History ==
Originally known as Paradise Row, the street first appears on maps in 1769. The street was renamed Wellington Street in 1845, or 1843, for Arthur Wellesley, 1st Duke of Wellington. Another street in the area, Nelson Street, was named for Horatio Nelson, 1st Viscount Nelson around the same time. Paradise Lane nearby retains its name.

The houses on the Upper section of the street were more affluent, with the houses on the Lower section being mostly tenements. The older and Victorian buildings in the area of Wellington Street Lower were largely demolished in the 1970s.

Damer Court is located on Wellington Street, supporting accommodation funded by a charity dating back to the 1700s founded by Joseph Damer.

There is one example of a surviving 18th century Georgian building on the corner of Dorset Street, operating as a pub named Glynn's (The Wellington House). A late Victorian former school now serves as a community centre on the upper section of the street.

=== Notable residents ===
- Solomon Williams, artist, lived on Paradise Row.
- John Henry Campbell, artist, lived on Paradise Row.
- John George Mulvany lived at 4 Paradise Row.
- Maureen O'Carroll, born on Wellington Street in 1913.
