= Thomas Eyre (engineer) =

Irish military engineer

Thomas Eyre was an Irish military engineer.

Thomas Eyre was the second son of Colonel Samuel Eyre of Eyreville, County Galway. In 1738, he joined the regiment of James Oglethorpe, the founder of the Colony of Georgia, and sailed to the colony. He rose from the rank of cadet to be sub-engineer for Georgia and South Carolina by 1743, when he left for England. As a lieutenant, Eyre joined Trelawney's Regiment of Foot, headed by Edward Trelawney, Governor of Jamaica. He served in Jamaica and at Roatán (Rattan), and was promoted to captain in 1748. Eyre retired from active duty in 1752.

On 31 August 1752, Eyre was appointed Surveyor General of Ireland, having purchased the office from Arthur Jones-Nevill. Joseph Jarratt worked as his deputy in this role. He undertook works at the Royal Barracks in Dublin, but the condition of the barracks was criticised by the Commissioners of the Ordnance for Ireland. As Surveyor General, he was also involved in harbour works at Dún Laoghaire, and was responsible for the rebuilding of the State Apartments at Dublin Castle. In 1763, the office of Surveyor General was abolished, and Eyre was transferred to the new post of Chief Engineer of the Ordnance. He also represented Thomastown and Fore in the Irish House of Commons.

Eyre died at Parliament House, Dublin, on 22 February 1772

Government offices
| Preceded by Arthur Jones-Nevill | Surveyor General of Ireland; 1752–1763 | Office abolished |
