= The Ha'Penny Bridge, Dublin =

1818 watercolour by Samuel Brocas

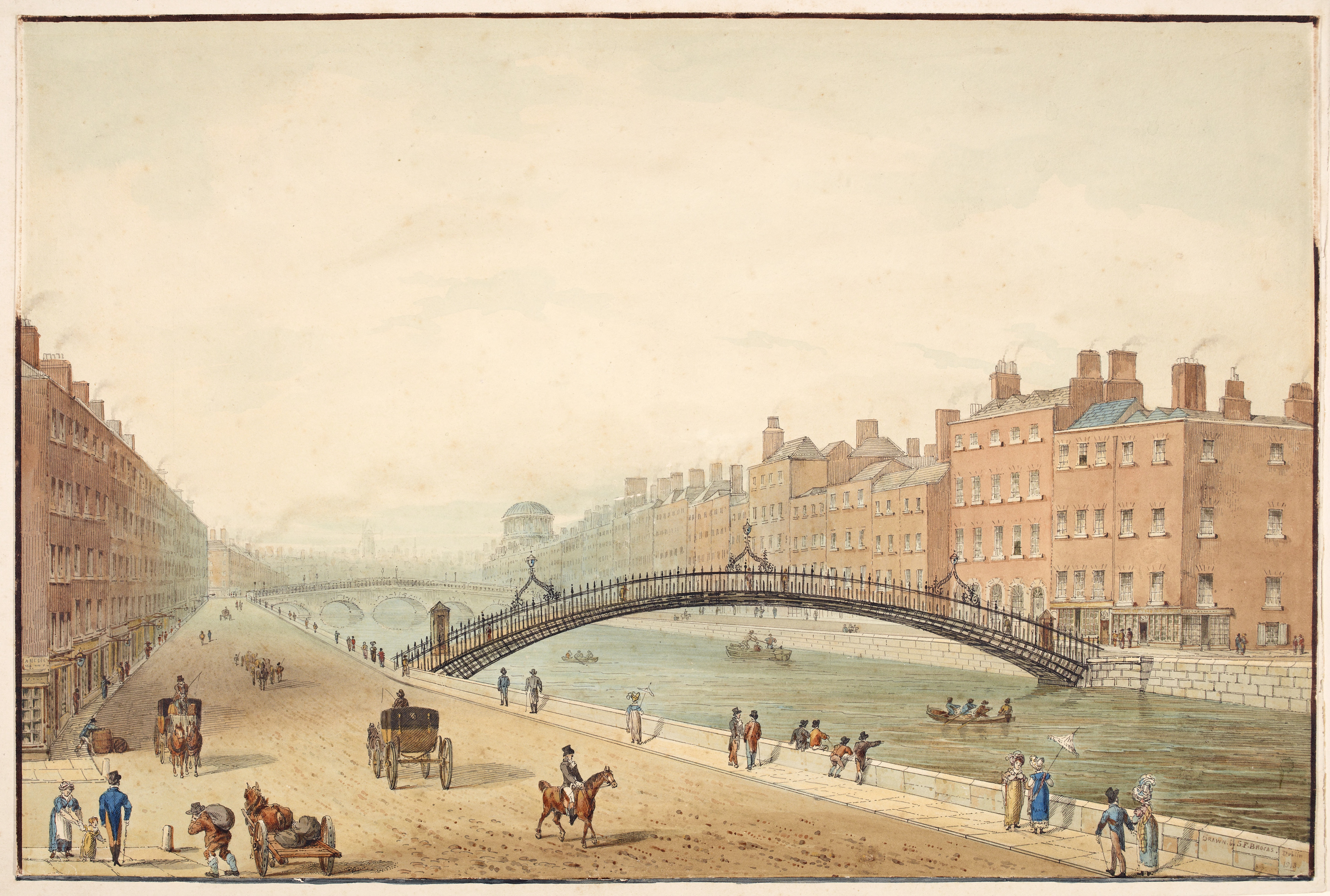
- Artist: Samuel Frederick Brocas
- Year: 1818
- Type: watercolour
- Dimensions: 36.3 cm × 53.5 cm (14.3 in × 21.1 in)

The Ha'Penny Bridge Dublin is a watercolour, of the Ha'Penny Bridge, by Samuel Frederick Brocas, from 1818.

== Description ==
The watercolour is 36.3 x 53.5 centimetres. It is located at the National Library of Ireland.

== Analysis ==
It shows the cast iron footbridge then known as The Liffey Bridge, along Aston Quay, and showing Bachelors' Walk.
