= William Thomas Mulvany =

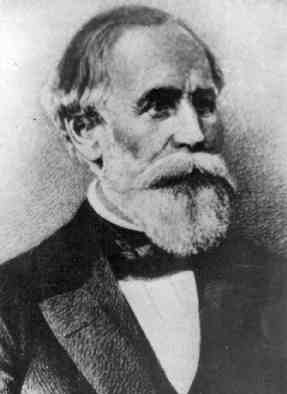
- William Thomas Mulvany
- Born: 11 March 1806; Dublin, Ireland
- Died: 30 October 1885 (aged 79); Düsseldorf, German Empire
- Occupations: Engineer and entrepreneur
- Known for: Becoming an entrepreneur in Germany
- Spouse: Alicia Winslow (m. 1832)
- Children: 5
- Father: Thomas James Mulvany
- Relatives: John Skipton Mulvany (brother), George Francis Mulvany (brother) Hans-Christoph Seebohm (great grandson)

William Thomas Mulvany (11 March 1806 in Dublin, Ireland – 30 October 1885 in Düsseldorf, Germany) was an Irish-born German entrepreneur.

== Early life ==
Mulvany was born in Sandymount, Dublin on 11 March 1806, one of seven children of Catholic parents. His father was the painter Thomas James Mulvany. His father was a founding member of the Royal Hibernian Academy (RHA) along with his brother John George. His mother, Mary (1779-1865) was the daughter of a physician, Dr Cyrus Field. His brothers, John Skipton, became an architect, George Francis was an artist, Richard Field was a newspaper editor, and Thomas John was also an engineer. He had two sisters, Eliza and Mary.

He was schooled at Dr Wall's school, Hume Street, and initially entered Trinity College Dublin to study medicine but left after a year, possibly due to his family's financial difficulties. He was then taken on as a pupil by Francis Johnston in 1824, and then John Semple.

== Career ==
=== In Ireland ===
Mulvany qualified through practical experience as an engineer. He learned technical drawing with an architect and joined the Irish Survey Office at the age of 20 years as a surveyor in 1826, transferred to the newly created boundary survey under Richard Griffith in 1827. In 1836 he became an employee of the Board of Public Works in Ireland. Mulvany was successively responsible for planning of waterways and the modernisation of the fishing industry, but especially for the purpose of drainage of large areas of agricultural exploitation. During the Great Irish Famine in the late 1840s, the projects of the Board of Works were simultaneously job creation schemes for the suffering rural population and in 1852, the work was stopped due to high costs, and Mulvany retired from the civil service.

In 1851 he published a paper introducing the rational method in hydrology. Even today, this is regarded as one of the most important steps forward in hydrological planning of drainage systems.

=== Move to Germany ===
Mulvany moved to Germany in 1855 as a representative and member of a group of Irish investors to participate in the coal mining in Ruhr. To tap the Hibernia Mine mine in Gelsenkirchen and Shamrock mine in Herne he hired British experts and let them introduce new mining methods. Afterwards he wrote:

As a result of a short visit to the Head Mining Office and examination of the geological map, I immediately realised what wonderfully extensive riches were hidden under the earth. I had seen how inadequate in those days were your railways and how insufficiently your canals and transport facilities were used. i said to myself on the spot: these people do not understand what they possess here.

Mulvany's special focus was directing transport, distribution and development of new markets for the coal mined in the Ruhr. That won him the recognition of the public, but did not optimise the yield of the mines. When in 1873 the mining company Hibernia was sold, the new corporation hired Mulvany as CEO. His youngest brother, Thomas John, assisted him in his work with the Hibernia Mining Company.

Already in addition to working for the investors, Mulvany planned surveying new mines for his own account. In 1866 he founded with other entrepreneurs, the Prussian mining and metallurgical corporation (PBHAG). The PBHAG included the mines Zeche Hansa and Zollern and the newly created Erin colliery, as well as ore mines and Vulcan ironworks. Because of costly technical problems during the development of mines and because of a sluggish development of the railway connections caused the PBHAG losses and had to register as insolvent during the Gründerzeit crisis in 1877.

Mulvany was awarded a gold medal by the Prussian King for his services to the public.

== Personal life ==
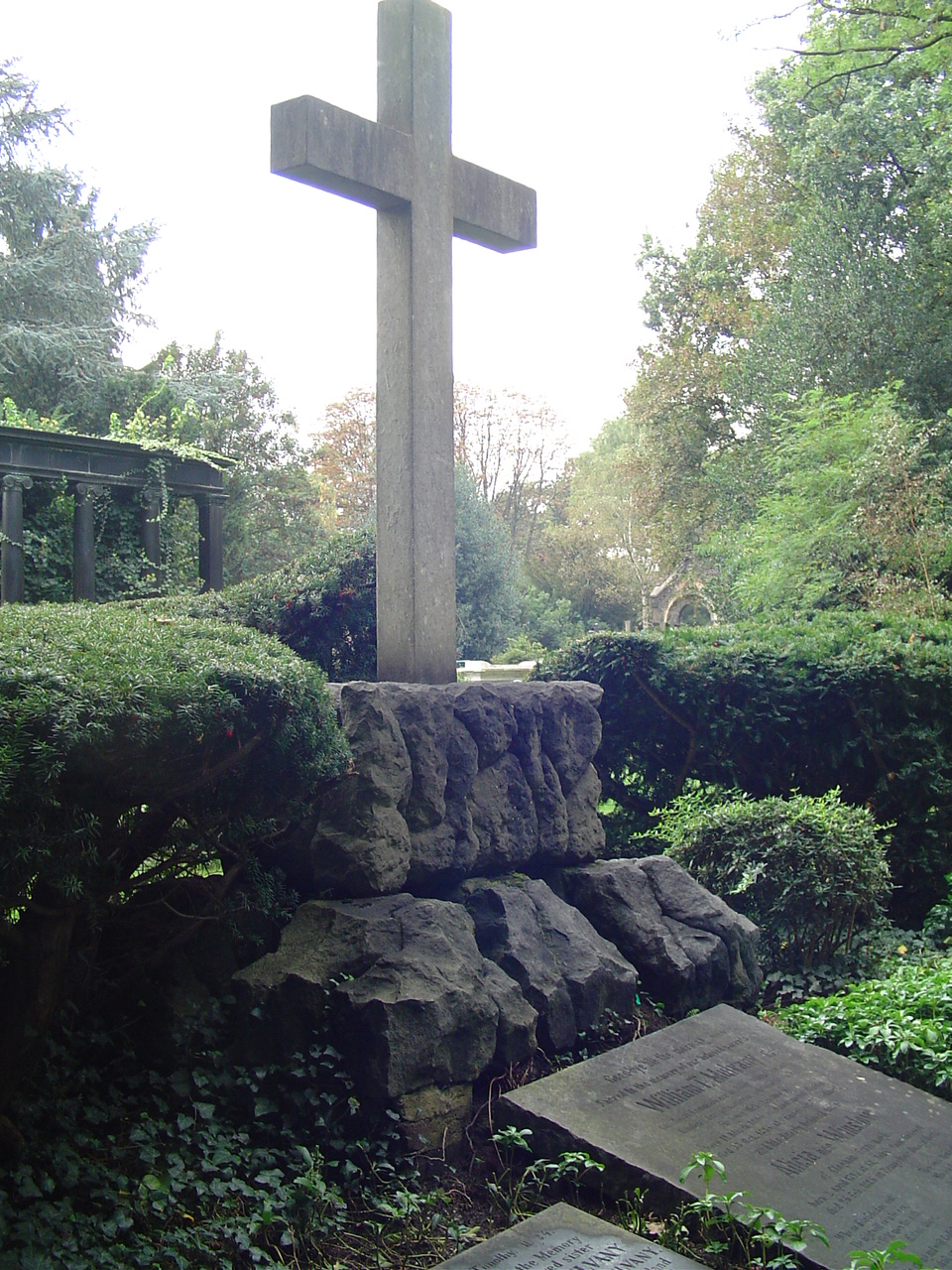
Grave of William Thomas Mulvany on the "hill of the millions" of North Cemetery (Düsseldorf)

In 1832, he married Alicia Winslow, the daughter of a wealthy landowner from Fermanagh. They had five children, Georgina (1834–1839), Alicia (1835–1898), Mary (1836–1875), and Annabella (1838–1917), and Thomas Robert (1839–1907), who went on to serve as the British consul in Rhine-Westphalia. From 1855 until his death, Mulvany lived in Düsseldorf.

In 1875, he built the "Mulvany Villa" in Herne, Germany, but it's not known whether he ever lived there. In 1864, Mulvany was made the first Freeman of the city of Gelsenkirchen. The address of the city fathers read:

About ten years ago you came to Gelsenkirchen to commence the undertaking which you have carried out with so much talent. You found Gelsenkirchen in an undeveloped condition, with bad roads, and one of the most insignificant stations on the Cologne and Minden Railway. With untiring zeal and admirable energy you have devoted yourself to those duties which you had undertaken. You have been an example of industry to us; you showed us what a strong will and clear understanding can accomplish. Gelsenkirchen is now a flourishing place, prosperity reigns in its houses, and it has become one of the most important stations on the line.

He died on 31 October 1885 and was buried in Düsseldorf. In Herne, a street near the former Shamrock coal mine was named after him. Also Castrop-Rauxel, Recklinghausen and Düsseldorf also named streets after the entrepreneur.

His daughter, Annabella, donated his private papers to the Archives for Rhine-Westphalian Industry but these were largely destroyed during World War II. His great grandson was the politician, Hans-Christoph Seebohm.
