= Robert West (painter) =

Irish artist, builder and stuccodore

- Born: Waterford, Ireland
- Died: November 1770; Dublin, Kingdom of Ireland
- Children: Francis Robert West
- Relatives: Robert Lucius West (grandchild)

Robert West (died November 1770) was an Irish artist, draughtsman and teacher.

== Life and family ==
He was born in Waterford, where his father was an alderman and mayor of waterford in 1740. Very little is known of his early life. He studied drawing and painting at the French Academy under François Boucher and Jean-Baptiste van Loo around 1735, and it is claimed he was awarded the first medal of the French Academy. Upton house, Northampton holds an oil painting from this period signed by West entitled Thomas Smith and his family.

West had 2 sons with his wife Mary. West died in November 1770 at Lurgan Street, Dublin.

== Career ==
Upon his return to Ireland, West founded a drawing school in George's Lane, Dublin in the late 1730s. Under the influence of Samuel Maddne, the school was commissioned by the Dublin Society to teach pupils from around 1744. In 1757, the Dublin Society established a drawing school, with West as Master, which would later develop into the National College of Art and Design. In 1747, 2 of West's pupils, George Barret and James Forrester, won awards. The school moved to Shaw's Court off Dame Street in 1750, and officially became part of the Dublin Society. West taught at the figure school and James Mannin, his assistant, taught landscape and ornament.

West specialised in teaching the French rococo style, with expertise in life drawing in crayon and chalk. He is cited as having a large influence on Dublin artists working in pastels. His chalk drawing of his student John O'Keeffe, in the Guido Reni style, was still being used for copying by students in 1811. Matthew William Peters' 1758 drawing shows Peters being drawn by West. There is a surviving example of West's work at 20 Lower Dominick Street of figures of birds decorating a staircase from 1758. In 1761 West was awarded a silver medal for excellence in teaching when 20 of his students received premiums from the Dublin Society. Thomas James Mulvany commented that West's life drawing in chalk "have never been surpassed and perhaps but rarely equalled...They are infallible models for study and have produced more good draughtsmen, and have impressed finer notions of the human form, than have the works of any other artist in the last century."

He was Master of the school from its foundation until 1763, when he suffered from a mental illness, and Jacob Ennis took over as Master. West again became Master of the school on the death of Ennis in 1770, although he too died the same year. He was succeeded as Master by his son Francis Robert West and his grandson Robert Lucius West.
