= James Brocas =

Irish artist

- Born: 1754; Dublin, Ireland
- Died: September 1780 (aged 25–26); Dublin
- Family: Henry Brocas (brother); James Henry Brocas (nephew); Samuel Frederick Brocas (nephew); William Brocas (nephew); Henry Brocas (junior) (nephew)

James Brocas (1754 – September 1780) was an Irish portrait painter.

== Life ==
James Brocas was born in Dublin in 1754. He was the fourth son of Robert and Bridget Brocas (née Taylor). His mother was from Wexford. His younger brother, Henry, was also an artist. Brocas studied at the Dublin Society's Drawing School, winning prizes in 1772 and 1773. He went on to become a portrait and miniature painter from his home, 64 Dame Street, Dublin. An advertisement for his services appeared in the Freeman's Journal on 28 February 1778, announcing his return to Dublin. He married in 1777. He died in September 1780, and was buried in St Andrew's Churchyard, Dublin.

There are no known finished works attributed to him, with all information about his techniques coming from his advertisements. It seems that he used a variety of materials such as a mixture of oil paints and crayons. Given the price he charged for bust-length profiles, a half-a-crown, it is likely these were silhouettes.

His four nephews by his brother Henry all became artists in their own right, James Henry, Samuel Frederick, William, and Henry.
