= William Brocas =

Irish artist

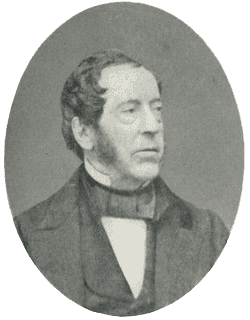
- Born: c. 1794; Dublin, Ireland
- Died: 12 November 1868 (aged 73–74); 120 Baggot Street, Dublin
- Family: Henry Brocas (father); James Brocas (uncle); James Henry Brocas (brother); Samuel Frederick Brocas (brother); Henry Brocas (junior) (brother)

William Brocas (c. 1794 – 12 November 1868) was an Irish artist known for his portraits and figurative drawings.

== Early life ==
William Brocas was born in Dublin around 1794. He was the third of the four sons of painter Henry Brocas.

== Career ==
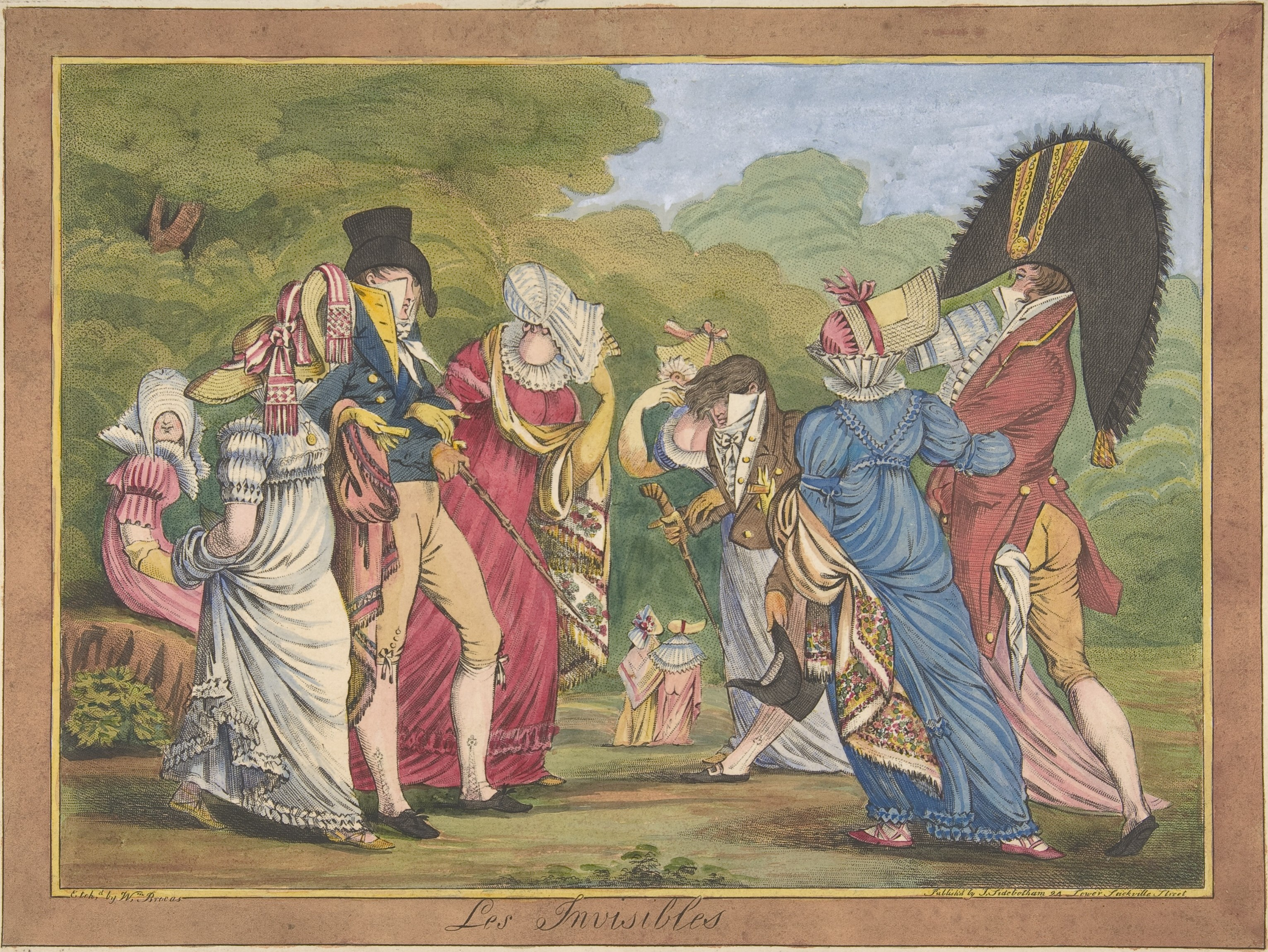
Les Invisibles by Brocas

Brocas was exhibited regularly in Dublin, such as with the Society of Artists in 1809 and 1812, and frequently with the Royal Hibernian Academy (RHA) between 1828 and 1863. He was the president of the Society of Irish Artists. In 1841 the Royal Irish Art Union purchased his oil paintings, View of Bray Head and Roderick O'Conor's Castle, to be awarded as prizes. The Union purchased his Departure of Irish emigrants in 1842, and it was exhibited at the 1865 Dublin Exhibition.

Brocas' most notable patron was Henry Westenra, 3rd Baron Rossmore, with Brocas going on to paint a series of views of the Rossmore estate, and portraits of the family. This includes a small full-length portrait of Anne Douglas Westenra. His portrait of Charles Maturin was later engraved by H. Meyer and published in the New Monthly Magazine in 1819. His etchings after Hogarth were engraved and published in Dublin by J. Le Petit. He was elected an associate of the RHA in 1854, becoming a full member in 1860. Like his father, Brocas also taught and drew political caricatures for publishers including James Sidebottom of Sackville Street, Dublin.

He died at his home, 120 Baggot Street, Dublin, on 12 November 1868. He left all his paintings to his younger brother, Henry. The Westenra family hold 9 of his portraits at Florence Court, County Fermanagh.

== Selected works ==
- Girl with Potheen and Goat's Milk, Killarney (1841)
- An Irish Fair (1842)
- Portrait of George F. Brooke (1845)
- The Infant Daughter of Charles Halpin (1845)
- Sunday morning (1847)
- The Forge (1858)
