= Arthur Jones-Nevill =

Irish politician

Surveyor General of Ireland
- In office 15 June 1743 – 30 August 1752

MP for Wexford
- In office 1761–1771

Personal details
- Born: 1712 County Wexford, Ireland
- Died: 24 September 1771 (aged 58–59)
- Spouse: Elinor Parker
- Children: 3 sons including Richard Nevill (1743–1822)

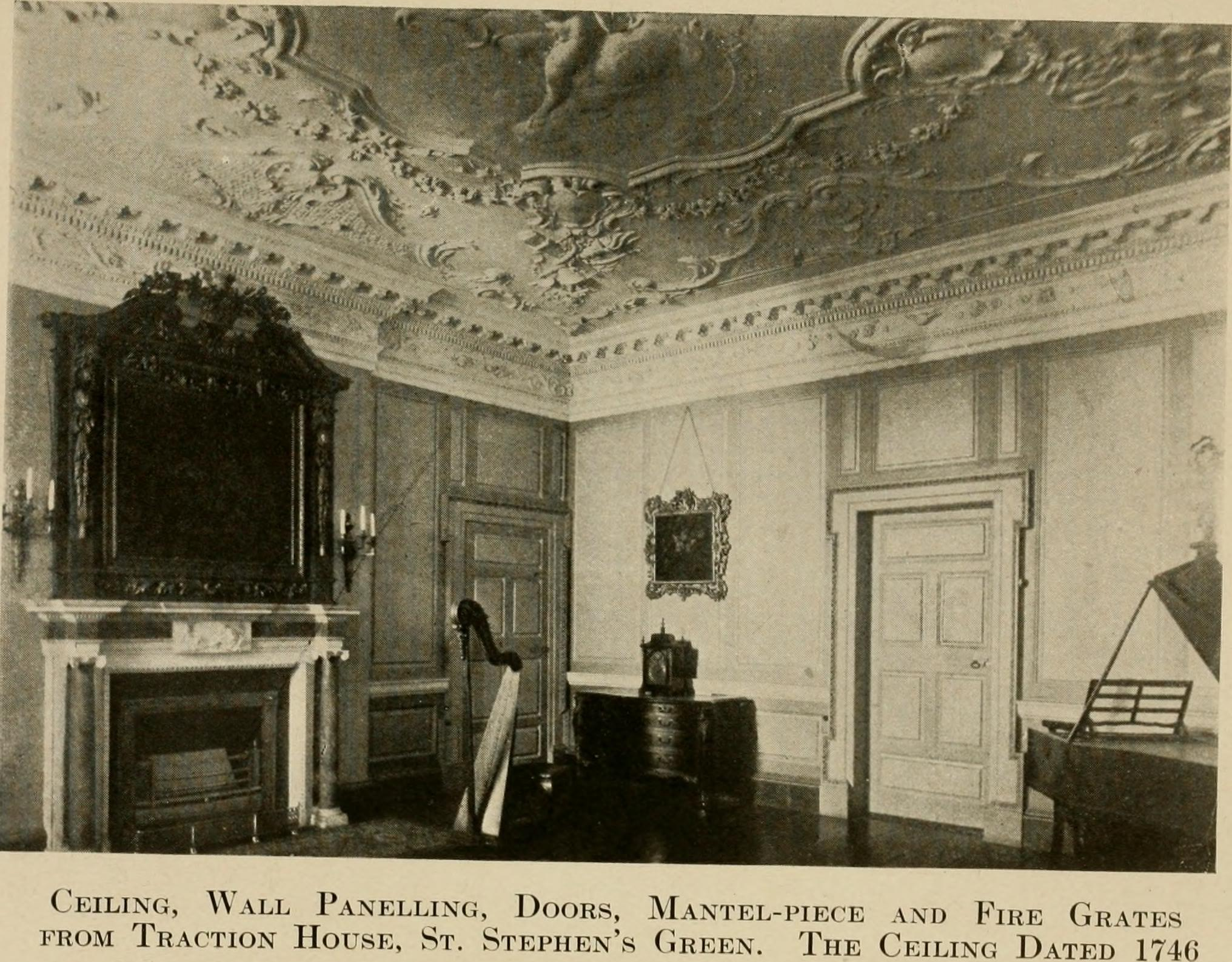
Interiors of Tracton House at 40 St. Stephen's Green, the home of Arthur Jones-Nevill.

Arthur Jones-Nevill (c. 1712 – 24 September 1771) was an Irish politician. He served as Surveyor General of Ireland from 1743, and later as a Member of the Parliament of Ireland, although he lost both positions following allegations of maladministration and peculation. He later returned to Parliament, serving until his death.

Born Arthur Jones, he was the son of Colonel Edward Jones of Wexford and Mary, daughter of Richard Nevill of Furness, County Kildare.

He entered Trinity College Dublin in 1729, graduating with a Bachelor of Arts in 1733.

As Nevill's only grandson, he adopted the surname Nevill before succeeding to that family's property in 1750. In November 1742 he married Elinor, daughter of Rear Admiral Christopher Parker and sister of Admiral Sir Peter Parker. By 1742 he was a member of the Dublin Society for improving Husbandry, Manufactures and other Useful Arts and Sciences.

In 1743 Jones-Nevill purchased the office of Surveyor General of Ireland for £3,300 from the previous Surveyor, Arthur Dobbs. He was appointed by letters patent of 15 June 1743, issued by Lionel Sackville, 1st Duke of Dorset, Lord Lieutenant of Ireland. As surveyor general, Edward McParland suggests that Jones-Nevill was more of a professional architect than his predecessor, Arthur Dobbs.

During his time in office he drew plans for barracks at Charles Fort and for the Bedford Tower range at Dublin Castle. In 1751, Jones-Nevill entered the Irish House of Commons as MP for County Wexford.

He was dismissed from the post of Surveyor General on 30 August 1752, following accusations of maladministration: he had failed to procure contractors for the upkeep of Ireland's barracks, one of his primary responsibilities as Surveyor General. However, he managed to sell the office on to his successor, Thomas Eyre. The "politically motivated" affair continued until the following year, when on 23 November 1753, he was expelled from Parliament. During the 1750s, attempts were made by John Rochfort, MP for Mullingar, to recoup the losses caused, through the introduction of several unsuccessful bills intended "To oblige Arthur Jones Nevill, esquire, late engineer and surveyor-general, at his own expense, and without any further charge to the public, to make good the defects in the several barracks, built, re-built and repaired under his direction, and to complete the same in the most effectual manner, according to the several contracts entered into for that purpose."

Jones-Nevill was a patron of the arts, installing a continental stucco ceiling in his new house at 40 St Stephen's Green, later known as Tracton House. When the house was demolished in 1912 the ceiling stucco work was transferred to the state apartments in Dublin Castle. He subscribed to a number of books on architecture and surveying.

He was also known for having sent the painter Jacob Ennis to Italy in 1753–1757. On his return he decorated he ceilings of Jones-Nevill's property at 14 Rutland Square.

In 1761, he returned to Parliament as MP for Wexford. He introduced a number of bills, including proposals "For the further encouragement of planting timber trees" (1765) and "For the better regulating of buildings in the city of Dublin, the liberties and suburbs thereof" (1769).

He was appointed High Sheriff of Kildare for 1762–63.

His eldest son Richard took over his Wexford parliamentary seat on his death in 1771.

Government offices
Preceded by Arthur Dobbs	Surveyor General of Ireland; 1743–1752	Succeeded by Thomas Eyre
