= Surveyor General of Ireland =

Royal official in the 16th to 18th centuries in Ireland

The office of Surveyor General of Ireland was an appointed officer under the Dublin Castle administration of Ireland in the 17th and 18th centuries. The Surveyor General was typically responsible for the surveying, design and construction of civic works, and was often involved in overseeing the construction of military barracks and public buildings. Though Surveyors General were officially appointed by the Lord Lieutenant of Ireland, it was not unknown for the post to be "sold" by one holder to the next. For example, Arthur Jones-Nevill succeeded Arthur Dobbs in 1743, having paid £3,300 to secure the position. And despite being dismissed for maladministration, Nevill was allowed to sell the post on to Thomas Eyre in 1752. (Note: McParland notes "Such sums were not fees or bribes to officials for the appointments; instead they represented the value of the post when it was viewed as the personal property of the holder of the patent". Thus the statement of May 1743 in TCD Clements MS 1741 that 'Dobbs has disposed his employment to one Mr Jones' (IAA, Edward McParland files, Acc. 2008/44)) Eyre was the last holder of the office, which was abolished in 1763.

== List of Surveyors General of Ireland ==
Name	Date(s) (Note: First or only date is date of appointment)	Term	Deputy Surveyors	Notes, refs.
Walter Cowley	15 November 1548	During pleasure		
Edmund Sutton	19 September 1551	Without tenure		
Michael FitzWilliam	12 May 1552	For life		Grand uncle of Thomas FitzWilliam, 1st Viscount FitzWilliam
Launcelot Alford	16 January 1572	During pleasure		
Sir Geoffrey Fenton	10 August 1591	For life		
Sir William Parsons	26 December 1602	During good behaviour		Survey of the escheated counties of Ulster.
Francis Blundell	18 February 1609	In reversion for life		
Sir William Parsons	14 February 1610			Re-instated.
Sir William Parsons and his brother Laurence Parsons	26 March 1611	For life		
Sir William Parsons, his son Richard Parsons, and Adam Loftus of Rathfarnham	24 December 1624	Upon surrender for life		
Benjamin Worsley	1652	During pleasure		Surveys for Adventurers' Act and Act for the Settlement of Ireland 1652
Vincent Gookin	11 January 1657	During pleasure		
Allen Brodrick	2 August 1658	For life		
Sir William Petty	18 September 1660	For life		Down Survey. Date and term are from Hardinge, who says William's cousin John Pettie was the appointee.
Sir James Shaen	13 February 1667	For life		
William Robinson	1670–1700	For life		Charles Fort, Royal Hospital Kilmainham, St. Michan's, St. Mary's, Marsh's Library.
William Molyneux	31 October 1684–98	For life		Molyneux paid Robinson £250 in return for a half-share of the patent (half of £300 per annum). The revised patent was issued with help from James Butler, 1st Duke of Ormonde. The full patent would revert to one on the other's death.
Thomas de Burgh	1700–30			Royal (Collins) Barracks, Trinity library, St. Werburgh's.
Edward Lovett Pearce	1730–33			Wings at Castletown House, Houses of Parliament, noted town-houses on Henrietta Street.
Arthur Dobbs	1733–43			Finishing Houses of Parliament after Pearce's death, and becoming Governor of North Carolina.
Arthur Jones-Nevill	1743–52		Gabriel Stokes (1748-52)	Maladministration, poor quality of barracks, being dismissed from post.
Thomas Eyre	1752–63		Joseph Jarratt (1752-62)	Lodge (later Papal Nuncio residence) at Ashtown Castle, reconstruction of State Apartments and gardens at Dublin Castle.
