= Henry Brocas =

Irish artist

- Born: 1762/1765; Dublin, Ireland
- Died: 2 November 1837 (aged 74–75); Dublin
- Family: James Brocas (brother); James Henry Brocas (son); Samuel Frederick Brocas (son); William Brocas (son); Henry Brocas (junior) (son)

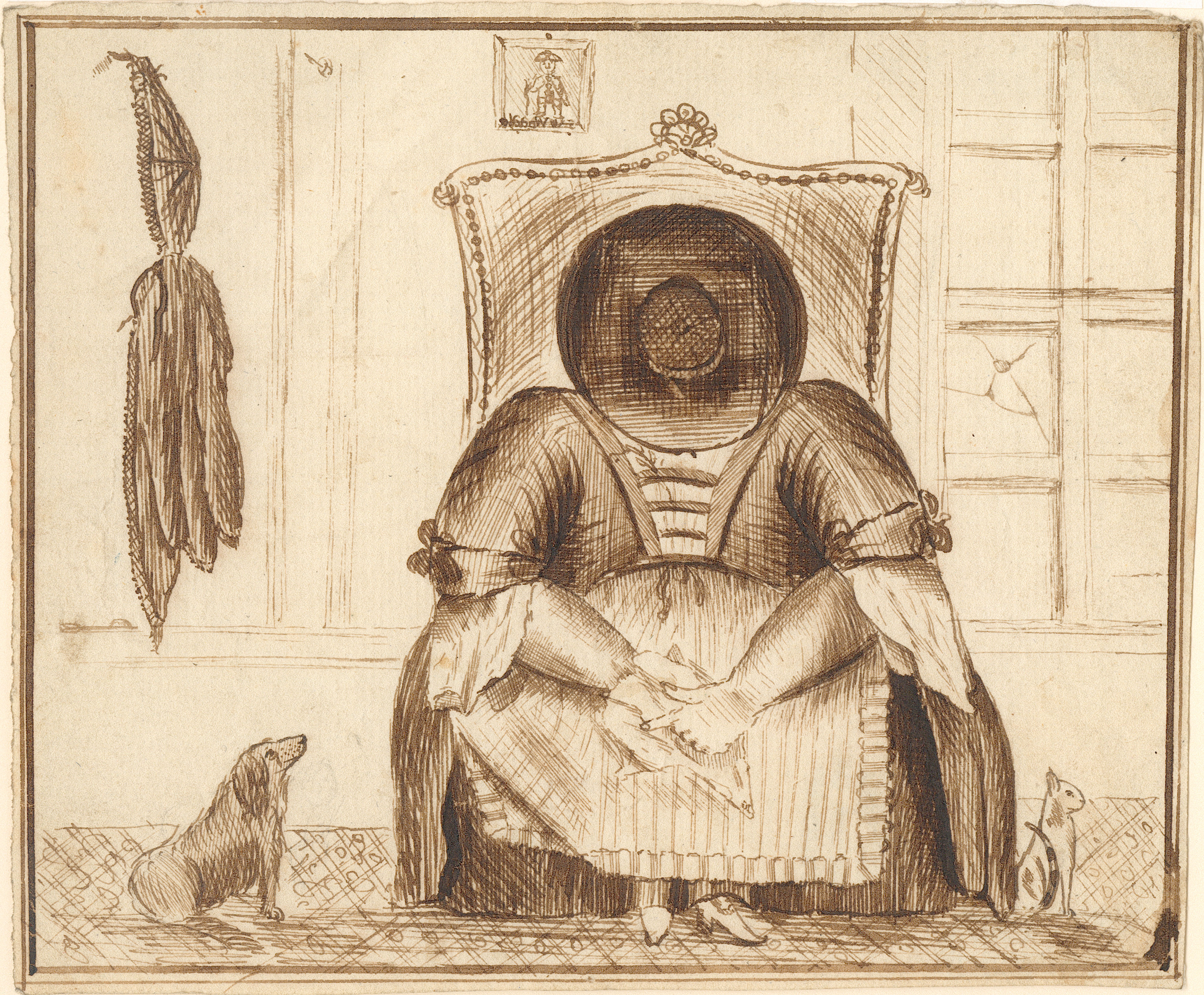
Print by Brocas, done when he was 16.

Henry Brocas (1762/1765 – 2 November 1837) was an Irish artist known for his landscapes.

== Life ==
Henry Brocas was born in Dublin in 1762 or 1765. The Brocas family descended from an Englishman, Robert Brocas, who came to Ireland from Derbyshire during the Cromwellian reign as a cornet of horse. Brocas was the fifth son of Robert and Bridget Brocas (née Taylor). His mother was from Wexford. His older brother, James, was also an artist. Between 1795 and 1799 he lived at 9 Gordon Lane, moving to 34 Grafton Street, and later in 1804 to 19 Chatham Street. He later settled in 15 Henry Street from 1825.

== Artistic career ==
He was a self-taught artist, working in watercolour and oils, and was also a prolific engraver. His engravings featured portraits, caricatures, and topographical views which were published in Dublin periodicals and magazines. One of his early political caricatures appeared in Exshaw's Magazine in 1784 entitled The loves of the fox and the badger. He also produced a number of satirical sketches about the Act of Union in 1800. He produced engraved portraits of the most famous people of his day, including Walter Hussey Burgh, John Foster, and Earl Fitzwilliam. He engraved a portrait of Robert Emmett which was published on the day of his trail, 19 September 1803.

In 1801 he was appointed Master of the Landscape and Ornament School of the Royal Dublin Society, a position he held until his death, despite being considered a poor teacher. He was regularly reprimanded by the School for his poor timekeeping and unpredictable methods, and was suspended for a period in December 1832 for "insubordination and disobedience of orders". He was exhibited at various Dublin exhibitions between 1800 and 1812, and in 1837 exhibited four drawing with the Royal Hibernian Academy.

In the early 19th century he drew political cartoons for Walter Cox's Irish Magazine, depicting British atrocities during the Irish Rebellion of 1798. He died in Dublin on 2 November 1837. Four of his sons, James Henry, Samuel Frederick, William and Henry, were also artists.
