= George Francis Mulvany =

Irish painter and first director of the National Gallery of Ireland

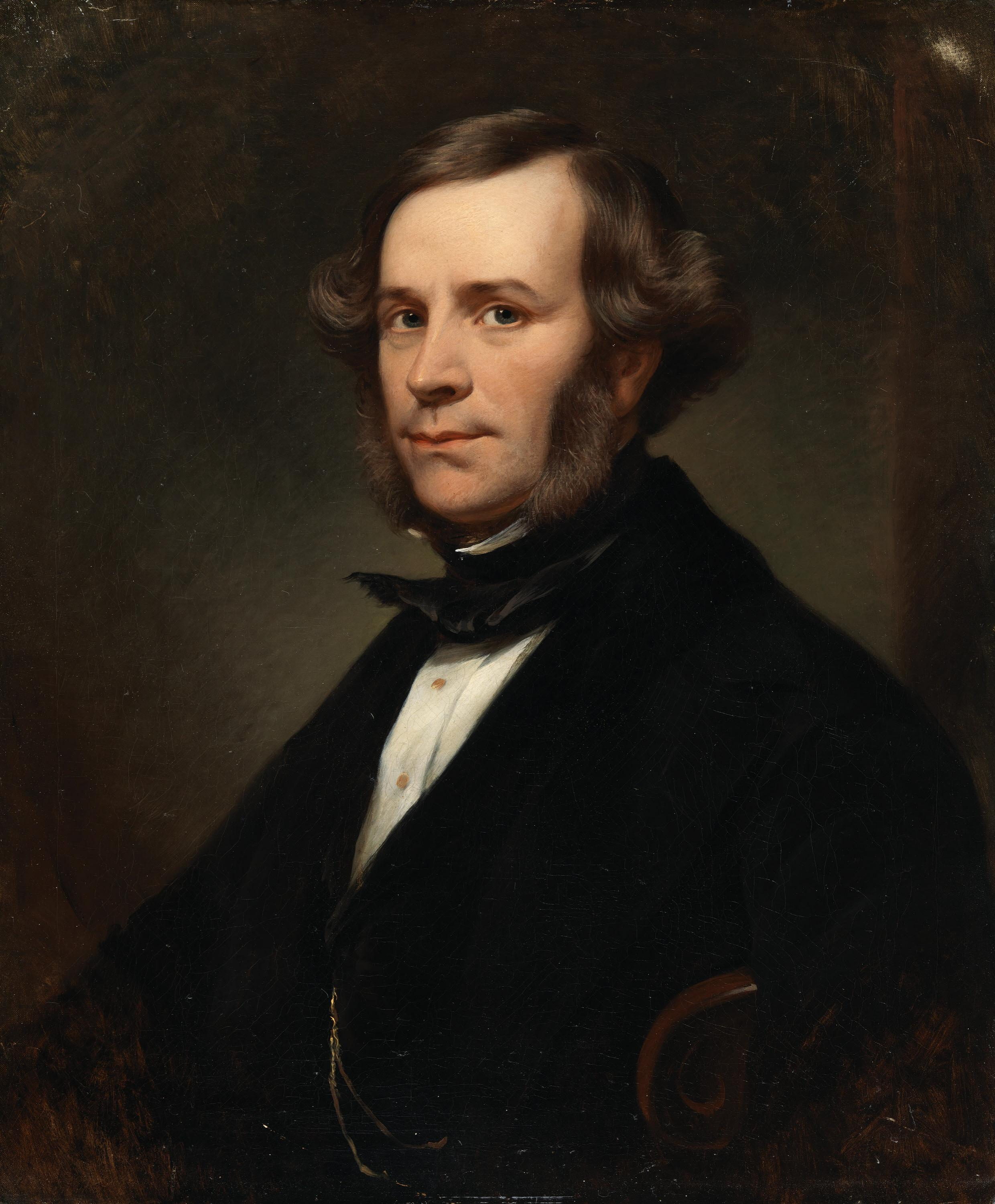
- Self-portrait of Mulvany
- Born: 1809; Dublin, Ireland
- Died: 6 February 1869 (aged 59–60); Dublin
- Resting place: Mount Jerome Cemetery
- Known for: Painting
- Father: Thomas James Mulvany
- Relatives: William Thomas Mulvany (brother), John Skipton Mulvany (brother)

George Francis Mulvany (1809 – 6 February 1869) was an Irish oil painter and the first director of the National Gallery of Ireland.

== Biography ==
George Francis Mulvany was the son of Thomas James, a painter and the Royal Hibernian Academy's (RHA) keeper, and Mary Mulvany (née Field). He was born in Dublin in 1809 and had four brothers, including the architect, John Skipton, and the engineers William Thomas and Thomas John, and the newspaper editor, Richard Field. He had two sisters, Eliza and Mary. Mulvany studied at the RHA school and would first exhibit there in 1827. He also studied in Italy.

In 1830 he became an associate member member of the RHA, and a full member in 1835. He took over as keeper upon his father's death in 1845, remaining in the role until 1864.He exhibited with the Royal Academy, London in 1836 and 1839. Often described as a prolific painter, he painted numerous portraits of the most famous in Irish society at the time including John Banim, Thomas Moore, Daniel O'Connell, and Sir Frederic Burton. Walter G. Strickland characterises his portraiture as "occasionally good, his work was, as a rule, commonplace and feeble in execution and unpleasantly brown in colour." He published the pamphlet Thoughts and facts concerning the fine arts in Ireland and schools of design, in 1847.

He was a supporter of the Royal Irish Art Union from its creation in 1839, and which was central to the foundation of the National Gallery of Ireland (NGI). Mulvany became the first director of the NGI upon its foundation in 1862. He oversaw the purchase of the first 70 paintings for the gallery, and produced designs for the gallery buildings, which were not realised.

Mulvany died at his home, 18 Herbert Place, Dublin on 6 February 1869 and is buried in Mount Jerome Cemetery.
