= Francis Robert West =

Irish artist

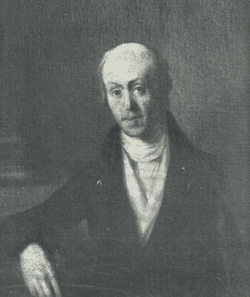
- Portrait of West by Robert Lucius West
- Born: circa 1749; Dublin, Ireland
- Died: 24 January 1809 (aged 59–60); Dublin

Francis Robert West (c. 1749 – 24 January 1809) was an Irish artist, draughtsman and teacher.

== Life and family ==
Francis Robert West was born in Dublin around 1749. He was the eldest son of Robert and Maria West. He received his initial training from his father. West was married twice, first to Angelica Wolverston, with Strickland describing him as a "most unwilling bridegroom". His second marriage was to Ellen Walsh. He had 4 sons, Lucius Francis, William who became a surgeon in the navy, while Micheal and Robert Lucius both became artists. Robert Lucius succeeded his father as master of the Dublin Society School.

Between 1770 and 1771, he lived at "Mrs Duff's, Cope Street", moving to Exchequer Street in 1772, where he lived for the rest of his life. West died on 24 January 1809 at his home at 31 Exchequer Street.

== Career ==
West was an accomplished draughtsman like his father, and spoke fluent French. In 1770, West took over as master of the Dublin Society drawing school his father had founded and held this position until his death. His younger brother, John (died 12 March 1818), was a porter at the school. West paid his brother out his own wages. West's father had tried unsuccessfully to train John as an artist, and John lived with his brother his whole life. A former student of West, James Dowling Herbert, described West as "A worthy good-hearted man, but of peculiar manner ... smart little dapper man, very voluble in speech and rapid in delivery, used much action – even his features underwent many changes – opening his eyes wide – raising his eyebrows considerably and extending his mouth".

West was granted a 2-month leave of absence in July 1774 to study in London. Having returned to Dublin, he resigned from the school, but was quickly reinstated to the position. West received annual wages of £100, more than the £60 the other 2 masters of the school received. Despite this, West demanded a pay rise in 1797, citing his 27 years of service. This was denied, and over time his tardiness at work was noted.

Between 1770 and 1780, West exhibited at the Society of Artists in William Street 5 times, and again in 1800 and 1801. In 1790, he exhibited 2 portraits at the Royal Academy. He generally work in crayons and chalks, focusing on figure drawing, portraits, with some historical and religious works. Crookshank and Glin liken his work to mid-18th century French engravings. Strickland calls his work "mechanical".
