= Corn Exchange, Dublin =

Commercial building in Dublin, Ireland

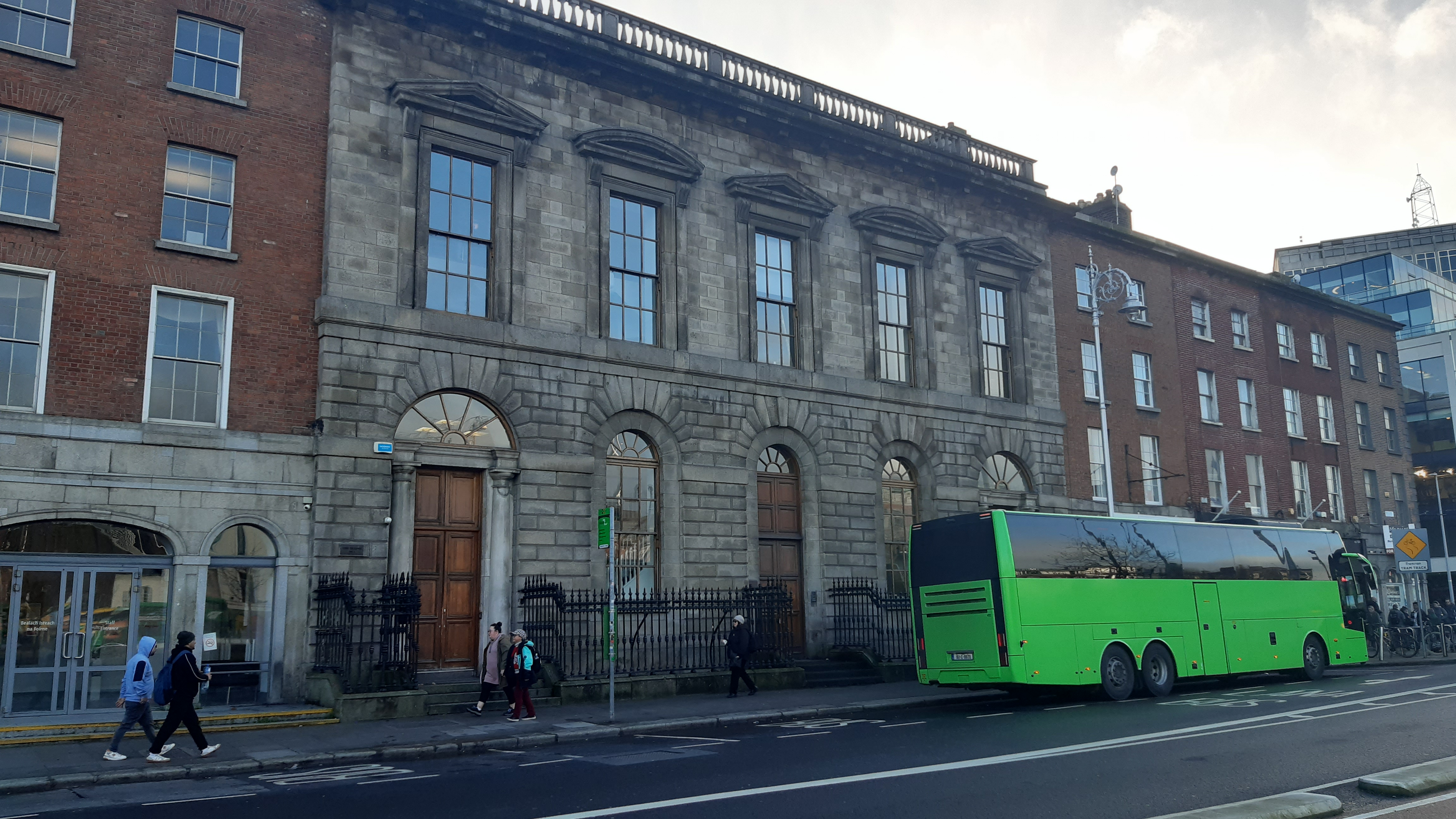
- The façade of the Corn Exchange on Burgh Quay in 2025

- Location within Central Dublin

General information
- Architectural style: Neoclassical, Georgian
- Location: Burgh Quay, Dublin 2, Ireland
- Coordinates: 53.3472°N 6.2566°W
- Groundbreaking: 1815
- Estimated completion: 1819
- Renovated: 1998

Technical details
- Material: limestone
- Floor count: 3

Design and construction
- Architect: George Halpin
- Main contractor: Thomas Baker and Robert McCartney (Stonemasons)

The Corn Exchange is a former commercial building and corn exchange on Burgh Quay, Dublin, Ireland. The 19th-century structure, which was subsequently converted to office space, is included in the Record of Protected Structures maintained by Dublin City Council.

== History ==
=== Earlier corn exchanges ===
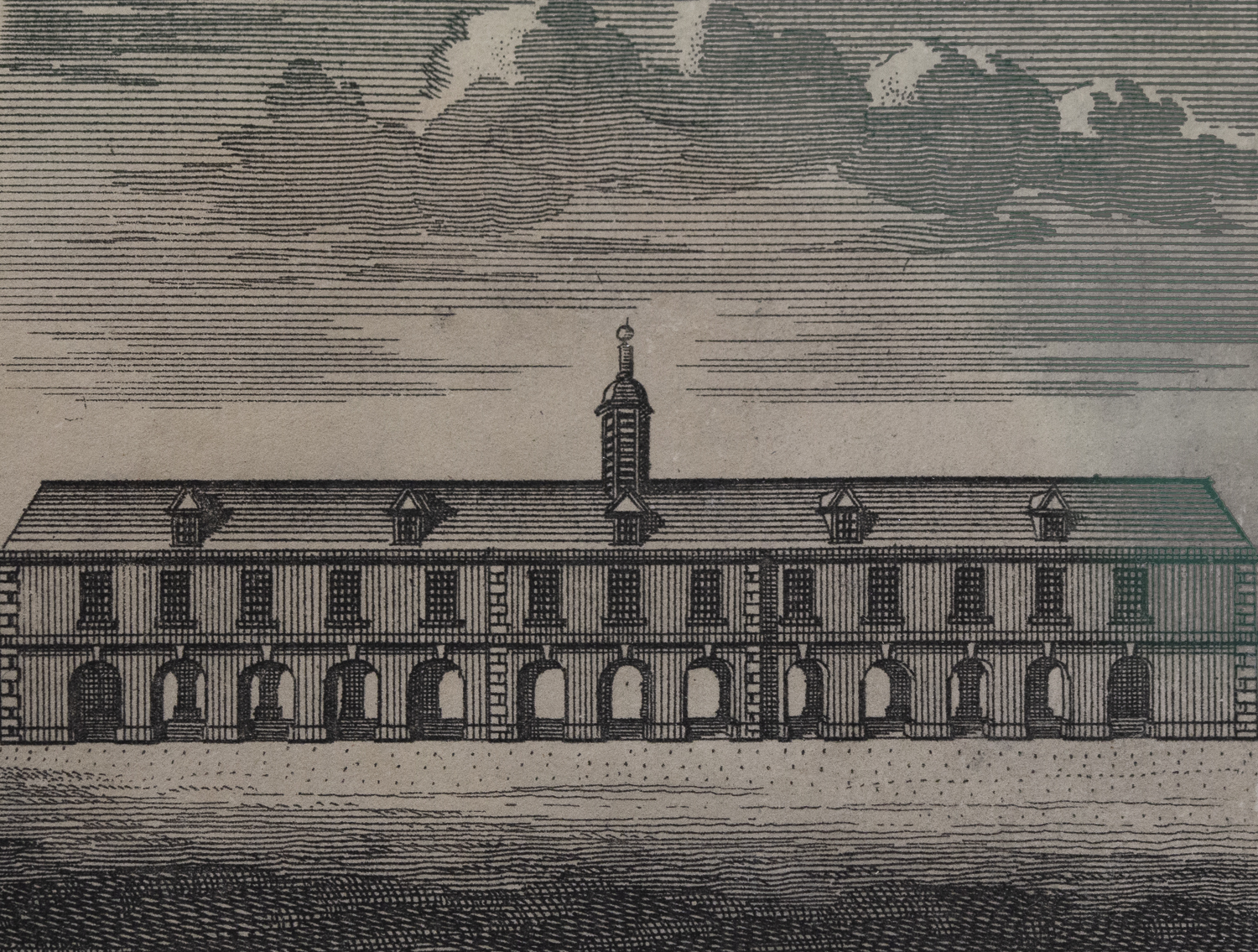
An illustration of Corn Market House in Dublin 8 taken from Charles Brooking's map of Dublin (1728).

One of the first dedicated corn exchanges in the city was near Thomas Street in Dublin 8 which was completed in 1725. It was a long 2-storey arcaded structure with 13 arches and a central cupola located close to Newgate and the Black Dog jail. This area is today often referred to as Cornmarket but was previously referred to as Newhall Market. In 1816, Benjamin Eaton was recorded as undertaking repairs including a reroofing of the building.

However by the first quarter of the 19th century, the location was considered inconvenient both as it was far from the modern port and because the structure was blocking the movement of goods on the street. The Wide Streets Commission decided that trading should be relocated. In response, a group of local businessmen decided to form a company, to be known as "The Corn Exchange Buildings Company", to finance and commission a new corn exchange for the city opposite the Custom House on Burgh Quay.

=== Burgh quay ===
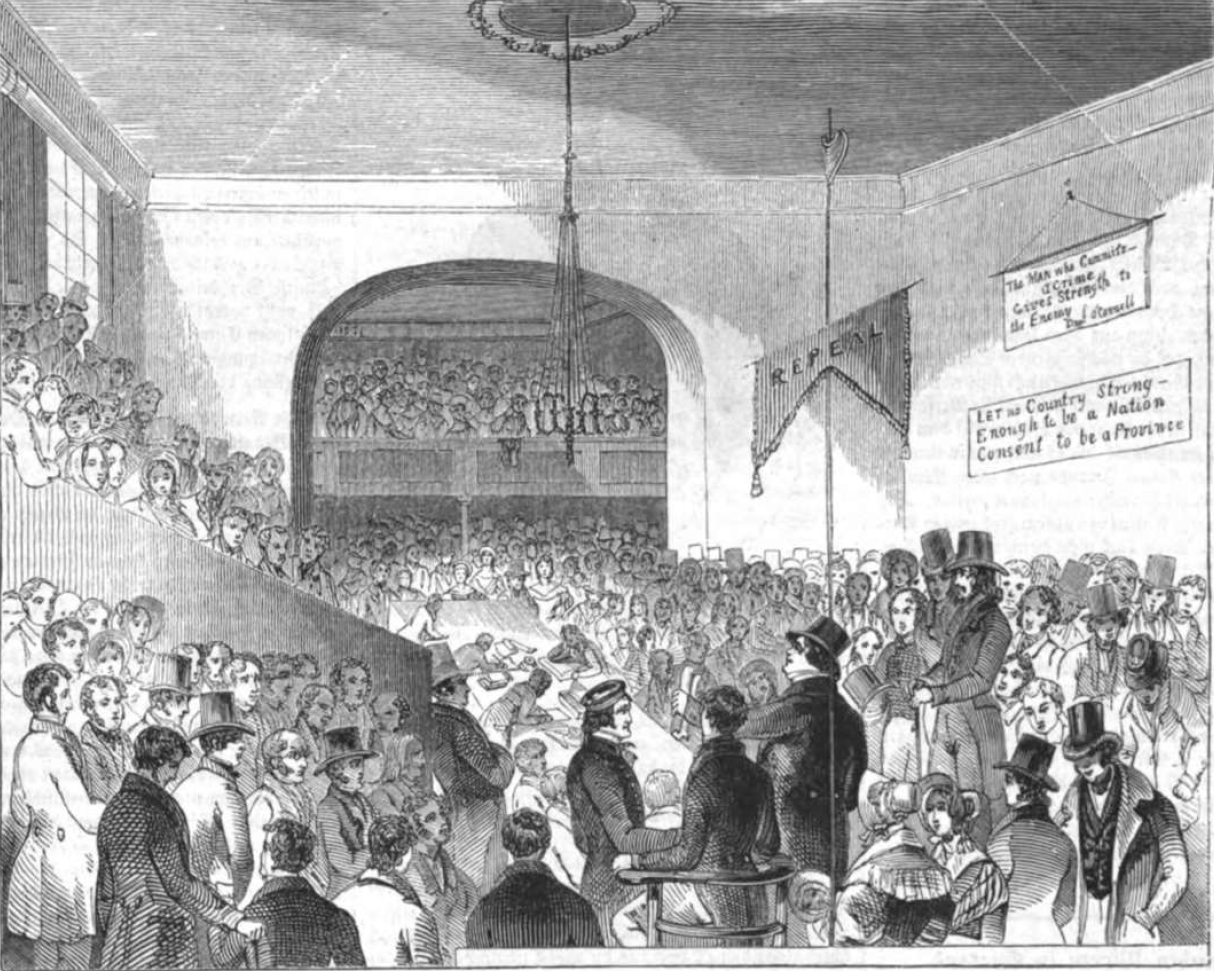
A meeting of the Repeal Association in the Corn Exchange in October 1843

A site was selected, at Burgh Quay on the south bank of the River Liffey, which was the furthest upstream that ships could sail after the construction of Carlisle Bridge (now O'Connell Bridge) between 1791 and 1794.

The new building was designed by George Halpin in the neoclassical style, built in ashlar stone at a cost of £22,000 and was completed in 1817. The building was rusticated on the ground floor and featured five round-headed openings with fanlights, voussoirs and keystones on that floor. The first floor was fenestrated by sash windows with architraves and pediments supported by brackets. The pediments were triangular in the first, third and last bays and segmental in the second and fourth bays. At roof level, there was a modillioned cornice and a balustraded parapet. Internally, the principal room was the main hall, which was 130 feet (40 m) long and stretched right back to Poolbeg Street.

The building was also used as a public events venue. The politician and leader of the Roman Catholic majority in Ireland, Daniel O'Connell, held the first meeting of the new Catholic Association in the corn exchange in July 1825. After more meetings in the corn exchange O'Connell secured Catholic emancipation through Roman Catholic Relief Act 1829. He went on to establish the headquarters of the Repeal Association, which sought the repeal of the Acts of Union 1800, in Conciliation Hall, to the immediate east of the corn exchange, in the 1830s. A major meeting of the Repeal Association took place in the corn exchange in October 1843. The movement had achieved such momentum by that time, that the UK Government was forced to sanction prominent people who attended O'Connell's meetings.

The use of the building as a corn exchange declined significantly in the wake of the Great Depression of British Agriculture in the late 19th century.

The building was converted into offices in the early 20th century. It fell empty in the 1970s and subsequently became dilapidated. It was acquired, in 1998, by a developer who retained the façade and some other notable features of the building but erected a new apartment structure behind it.
