= Robert William Armstrong =

Irish architect

- Born: 1 December 1824; County Longford, Ireland
- Died: 27 January 1884 (aged 59); Belleek, County Fermanagh
- Occupations: Architect and civil engineer
- Known for: co-founder of Belleek Pottery, and design of the pottery's factory buidling

Robert William Armstrong (1 December 1824 – 27 January 1884) was an Irish architect, civil engineer, and co-founder of Belleek Pottery.

== Life and family ==
Robert William Armstrong was born in County Longford on 1 December 1824, with one source giving the date of birth as 1 January 1824. His father was the architect and builder, Francis Armstrong. Armstrong expressed an early interest in pottery, but instead trained as a civil engineer and architect. In 1837, he may have enrolled with the Dublin Society School of Drawing in Architecture.

In 1848, Armstrong married the artist Anna Langley Nairn, the daughter of artists Cecilia Margaret and George Nairn. The couple had 5 children, Katherine Cecilia (born 1850), Robert William (1852–1890), Annie Langley Nairn (1864–1888), David (born 1867), and Samuel (born 1870). The lived at Rose Isle, Belleek. Some of their children later emigrated to Australia, resulting in 8 volumes of Armstrong's Memorandums being deposited with the Museum of Applied Arts and Sciences, Sydney. Copies of 7 of the volumes are held in the National Museum of Ireland.

== Career ==
Belleek Pottery factory, County Fermanagh designed by Armstrong

He exhibited with the Royal Hibernian Academy in 1848 and 1849, and with the Royal Academy, London between 1848 and 1857. His architectural commissions in Ireland include St Anne's church, Killygordon, County Donegal from 1858 and remodelling the manor house of Killadeas, County Fermanagh between 1861 and 1868. Armstrong went on to work with both the Minton pottery, Stoke-on-Trent, and the Royal Porcelain Works, Worcester, learning more about ceramics. He was employed by W. H. Kerr (fl. 1851–72), a Dublin who befriended him, as well as becoming his advisor and his Dublin agent.

In 1857, Armstrong co-founded the company that would become Belleek Pottery. Founded with the Dublin businessman David McBirney (1804–82) on the estate of John Caldwell Bloomfield in Belleek, County Fermanagh, originally called D. McBirney & Co. Armstrong designed the factory to look like a large country house, as well as specifying the machinery installed within. Initially, the pottery produced superior quality but utilitarian earthenware such as domestic and sanitary ware, fine stoneware, and telephone insulators all mass-produced using a process under Armstrong's patent. The aim was to eventually move to producing porcelain.

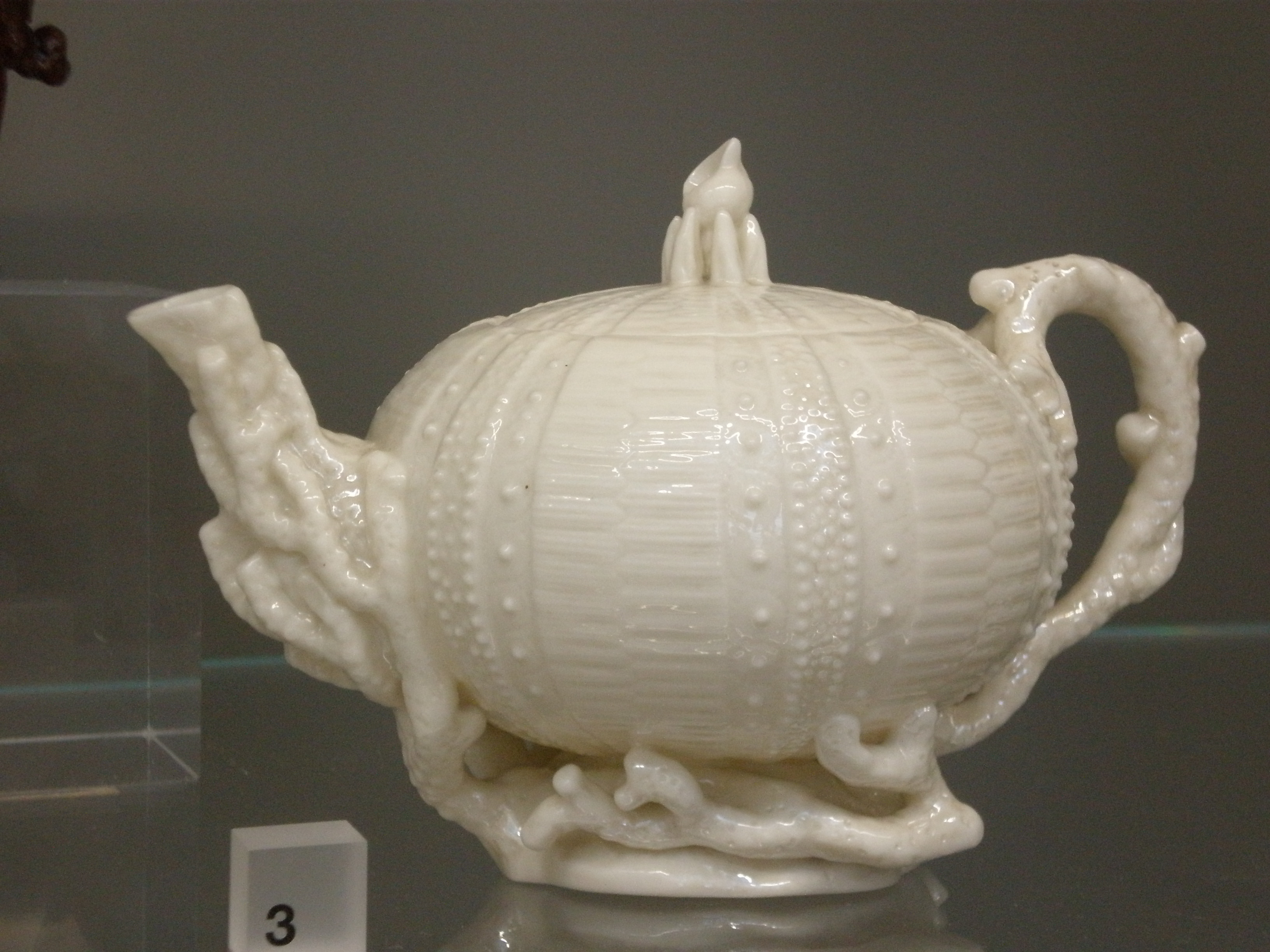
Echinus range teapot, designed by Armstrong

Armstrong acted as art director and manager, overseeing experimentation and development of new ceramics, designs and glazes that are unique to Belleek, leading him to write Memorandums of various matters connected with pottery bodies and glazes collected or invented by Robert W. Armstrong commenced at Belleek Enniskillen 1860. The pottery's "echinus" pattern services and the "spider's plate" designs are attributed to him. His wife, Anna, is credited with introducing the early popular marine and botanical motifs, and worked with William Wood Gallimore, an English potter, creating over 500 designs today. Armstrong's daughter, Katie, is credited with designing the "Neptune" tea set. Around 1863, the pottery recruited skilled English potters, allowing for the production of Belleek parian porcelain. They produced tableware, ornaments, busts, and statuettes.

Armstrong was highly successful at marketing the Belleek products as works of art, and garnered the patronage of nobles as well as Queen Victoria and the prince of Wales. in 1872, the pottery won gold medals at the Dublin Exposition and at the 1880 Melbourne International Exhibition. The pottery had 170 employees in 170 and at the height of its commercial success in 1882, when McBirney died. His son, Robert, wanted to sell the pottery and refused to acknowledge Armstrong's partnership claim, citing the lack of a written contract. By this time, Armstrong had invested all his money in the company, and a sale would ruin him, so he began legal proceedings to have the sale blocked and his partnership recognised.

Armstrong died suddenly at his home on the factory grounds, Rose Isle, on 27 January 1884. The pottery was closed and later sold to a group of local businessmen. A small sum was paid to his widow for his patents. Armstrong is buried at the Church of Ireland churchyard in Belleek.
