= International Exhibition of Arts and Manufactures =

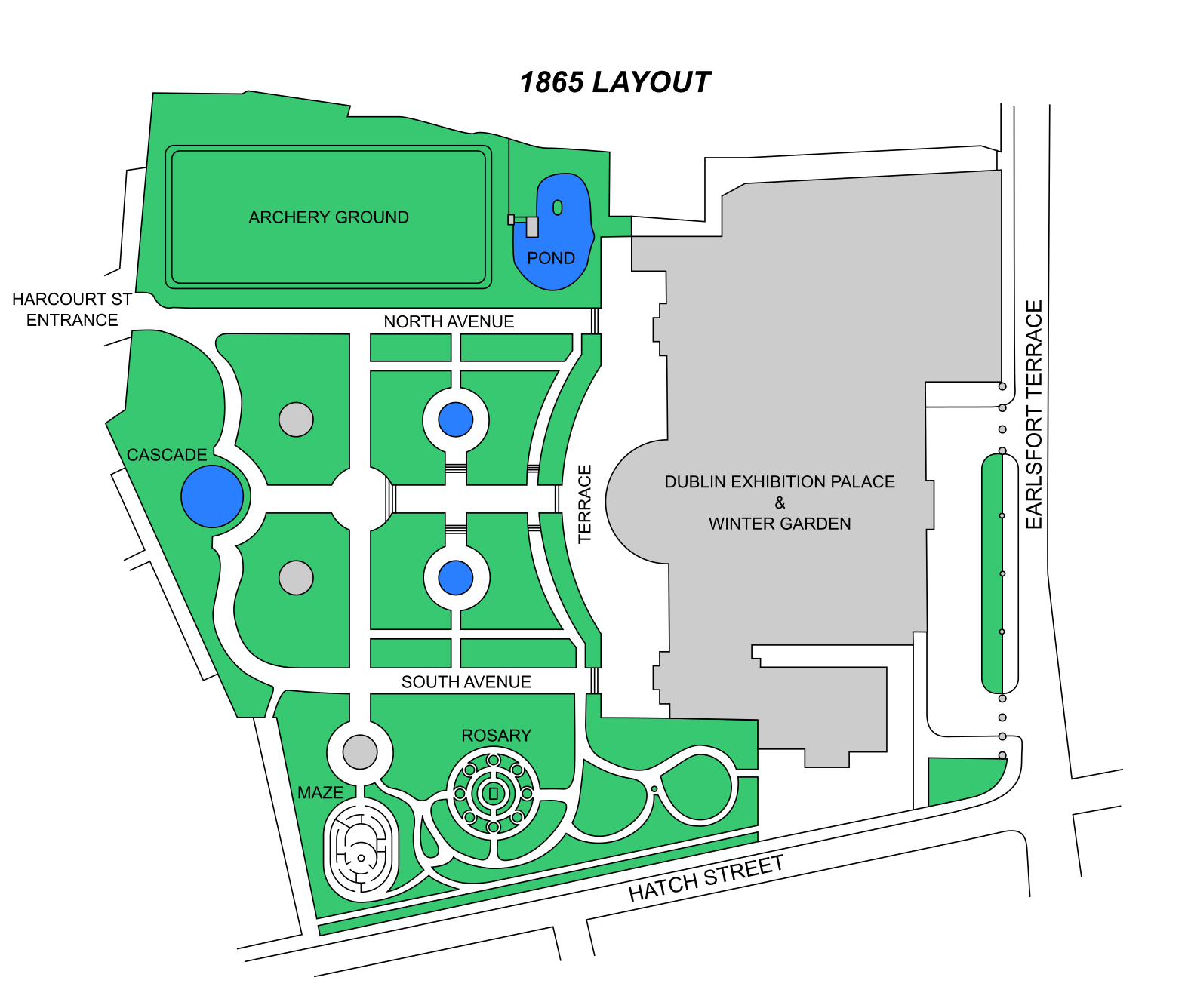
- Plan of the Dublin Exhibition Palace and Winter Garden

Overview
- BIE-class: Unrecognized exposition
- Name: International Exhibition of Arts and Manufactures
- Building(s): National Concert Hall
- Area: 17 acres (6.9 hectares)
- Visitors: 956000

Participant(s)
- Countries: 48 (countries, cities and British colonies)

Location
- Country: United Kingdom of Great Britain and Ireland
- City: Dublin
- Venue: Dublin Exhibition Palace and Winter Garden
- Coordinates: 53.336°N 6.262°W

Timeline
- Opening: May 9, 1865
- Closure: November 10, 1865

Unrecognized expositions
- Previous: Exposition Universelle in Metz
- Next: Sydney Intercolonial Exhibition (1870) in Sydney

Simultaneous
- Other: 1865 International Exhibition in Porto

The International Exhibition of Arts and Manufactures was a world's fair held in Dublin, Ireland in 1865 attended by almost 1 million visitors.

== Site and buildings ==
=== Main site ===
In 1862, the Duke of Leinster, Lord Talbot de Malahide and Benjamin Guinness created the Dublin Exhibition Palace and Winter Garden Company to establish a Dublin exposition, the first in Dublin since the Great Industrial Exhibition of 1853. Guinness supplied the Coburg Gardens, a 15-acre site to the company, which lay between Hatch Street, Harcourt Street and Earlsfort Terrace; and they additionally leased 2 more acres for exhibition grounds.

In 1862, the company called for designs at a cost of £35,000 or less. None of the submitted plans came within this cost constraint, but plans from Alfred G. Jones were accepted with the proviso that they were revised. In the final design there were three buildings: a brick and stone building, a stone building with iron roof and an iron and glass building, the latter influenced by the Crystal Palace in London.

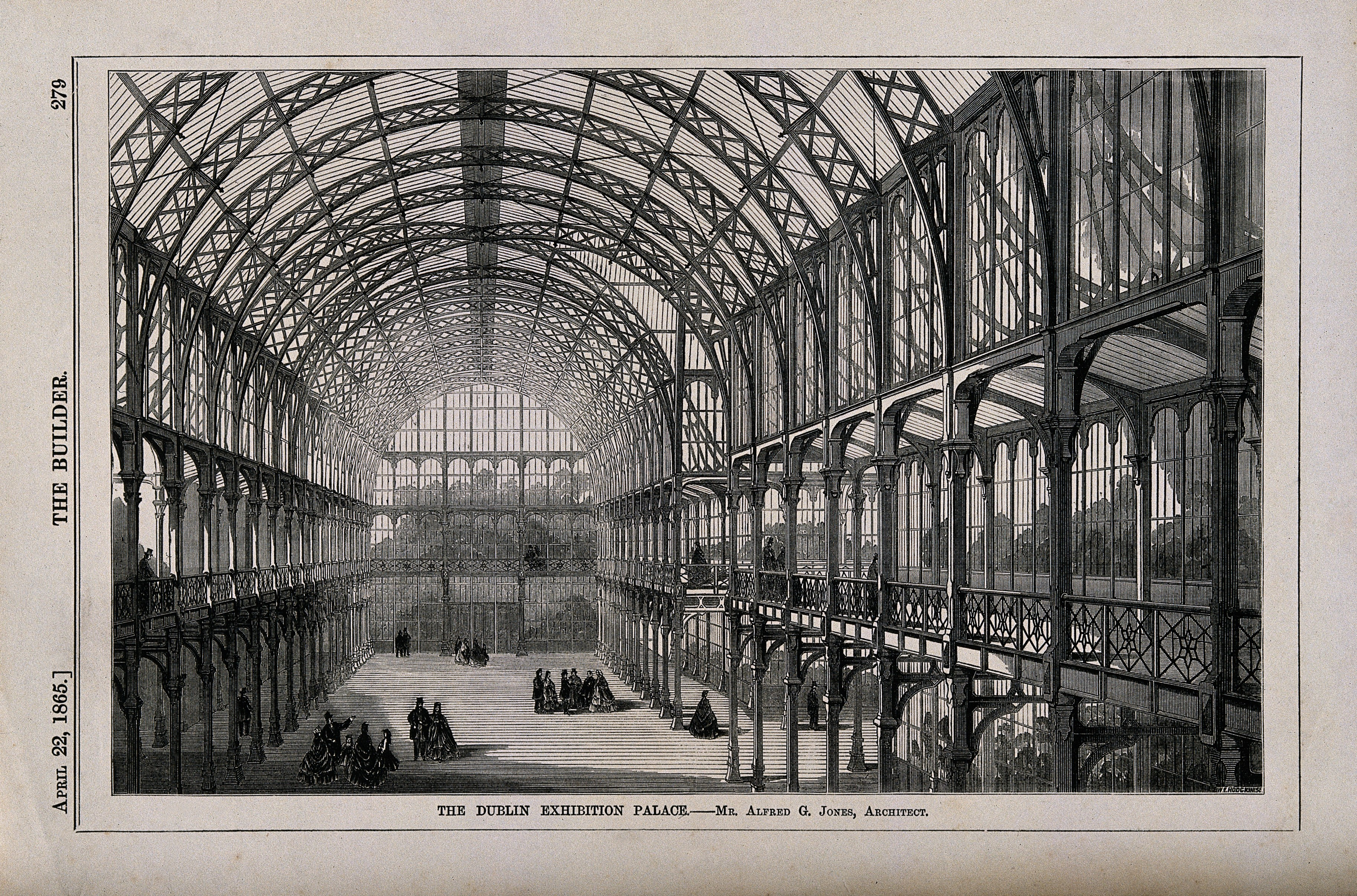
1860s engraving labelled of interior of the Dublin Exhibition Palace"

The foundations were started in 1863.

=== Auxiliary site ===
In addition to the main site and gardens; vegetable, seeds, and farm implements were displayed at the Royal Dublin Society buildings (now Archaeology and Natural History Museum buildings) in Kildare Street.

== The fair ==
The iron and glass building was stress tested by 600 soldiers marching along the galleries on 31 March 1865 and the exhibition opened by the Prince of Wales on either 9 May or 8 May, 1865.

The fair attracted 956,000 visitors with averages of 5,000 day visitors, and 3,000 evening visitors

Displays of fine arts, textiles, manufactured goods and raw materials occupied 4,781 display cases (2,413 British Isles, 2,368 foreign countries, cities and colonies).

Belleek Pottery from the town of Belleek in County Fermanagh used the event as an opportunity to enhance the newly-established factory's reputation, displaying mainly "stoneware, including tableware and mortars and pestles for compounding, but also some Parian figures and statuary and some earthenware." The Art Journal of December 1865 noted that the factory had received an award for productions that give "good promise of future excellence".

== Aftermath ==
After 1911, the building that lay along Earlsfort Terrace and the winter gardens became part of one of the city's university and later the building became the National Concert Hall with the winter gardens forming the Iveagh Gardens. A rustic grotto and some statues remain in Iveagh Gardens.
