= Anna Langley Armstrong =

Irish artist

- Born: Anna Langley Nairn; 1828; Dublin, Ireland
- Died: 28 March 1888 (aged 59–60); Belleek, County Fermanagh
- Known for: painter
- Spouse: Robert William Armstrong

Anna Langley Armstrong née Anna Langley Nairn (1828 – 28 March 1888) was an Irish painter and pottery designer involved with Belleek Pottery.

== Life ==
Anna, also known as Annie, Langley Armstrong was born Anna Langley Nairn, in Dublin in 1828. Her parents were Cecilia Margaret Nairn, a wax modeller and painter, and George Nairn, an animal painter. Her maternal grandfather was also a painter, John Henry Campbell. Her brother, John Campbell Nairn, was also an artist and later became a restorer in England.

From 1844 to 1847, she exhibited landscapes with the Royal Hibernian Academy, working in watercolours and oils. These were paintings of famous views in Counties Kerry and Wicklow. No known examples of her paintings survive.

She married the Dublin based architect, Robert William Armstrong, in 1848. The couple had 5 children, Katherine Cecilia (born 1850), Robert William (1852-1890), Annie Langley Nairn (1864-1888), David (born 1867), and Samuel (born 1870). The lived at Rose Isle, Belleek.

Along with her husband, Armstrong became involved with the Belleek Pottery, County Fermanagh after her husband founded the pottery in 1857 with David McBirney. Together, they are credited with the success of the factory, with her working with her husband on the artistic direction. Armstrong introduced the early popular marine and botanical motifs. She worked with the English designer, William Wood Gallimore, who joined the pottery in 1863, with the pair producing over 500 designs.

When David McBirney died in 1882, his son Robert, tried to sell the pottery and did not acknowledge Robert William Armstrong's claims as a partner in the business and a legal battle ensued. Armstrong was widowed suddenly in 1884 during the legal proceedings, and ultimately a small sum to Armstrong for her husband's patents. She died in 1888.
