= Battam =

Battam is a surname. Notable people with the surname include:

- Larry Battam (1876–1938), American baseball player
- Thomas Battam (1810–1864), English painter
