= Earlsfort Terrace =

Street in Dublin, Ireland

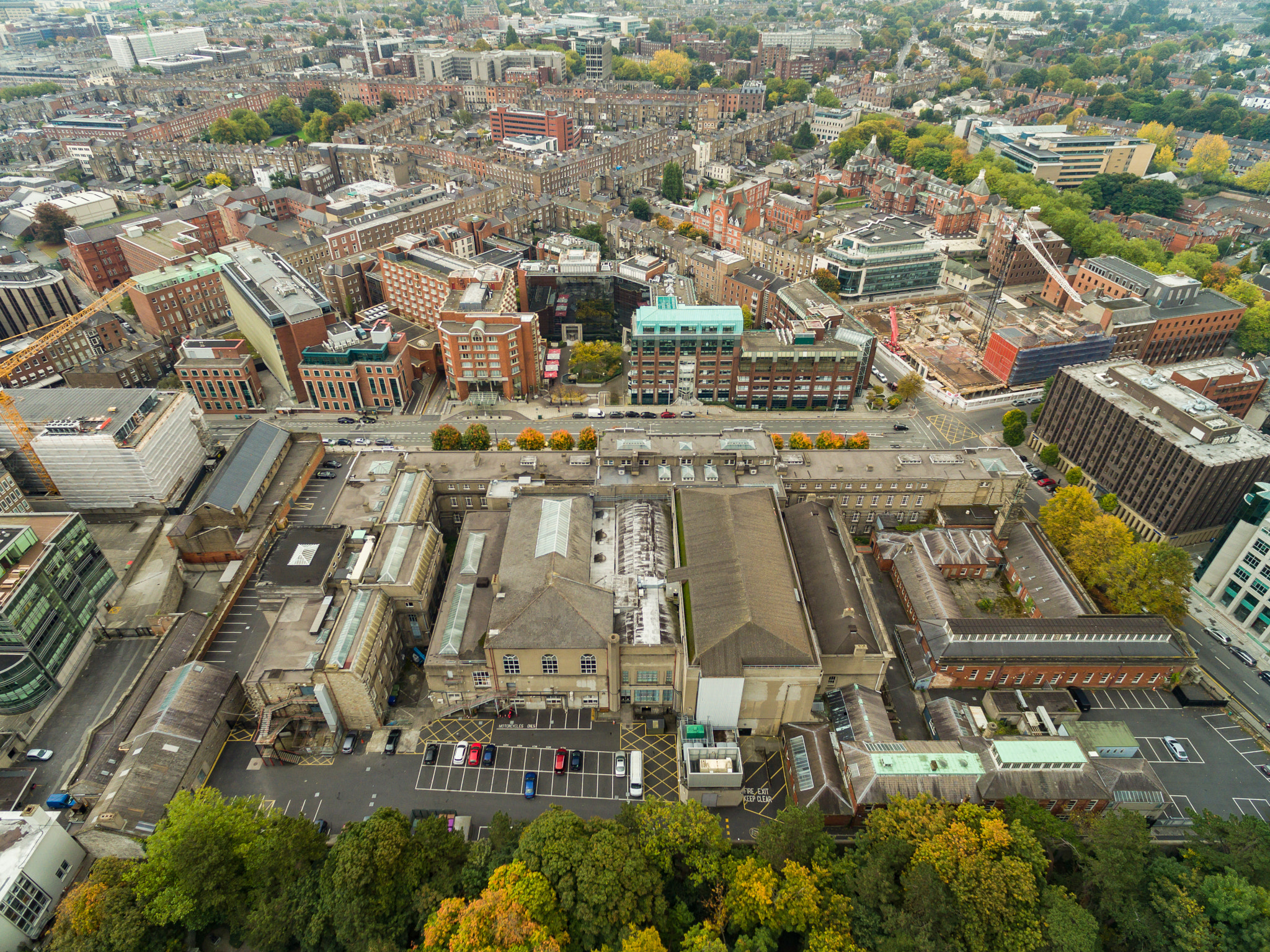
- Aerial view of Earlsfort Terrace over the National Concert Hall

- Location within Central Dublin
- Namesake: John Scott, 1st Earl of Clonmell
- Location: Dublin, Ireland
- Postal code: D02
- Coordinates: 53.3327941°N 6.2592947°W
- North end: St Stephen's Green
- South end: Adelaide Road

Earlsfort Terrace (Irish: Ardán Phort an Iarla) is a street in Dublin, Ireland which was laid out in the 1830s.

== History ==
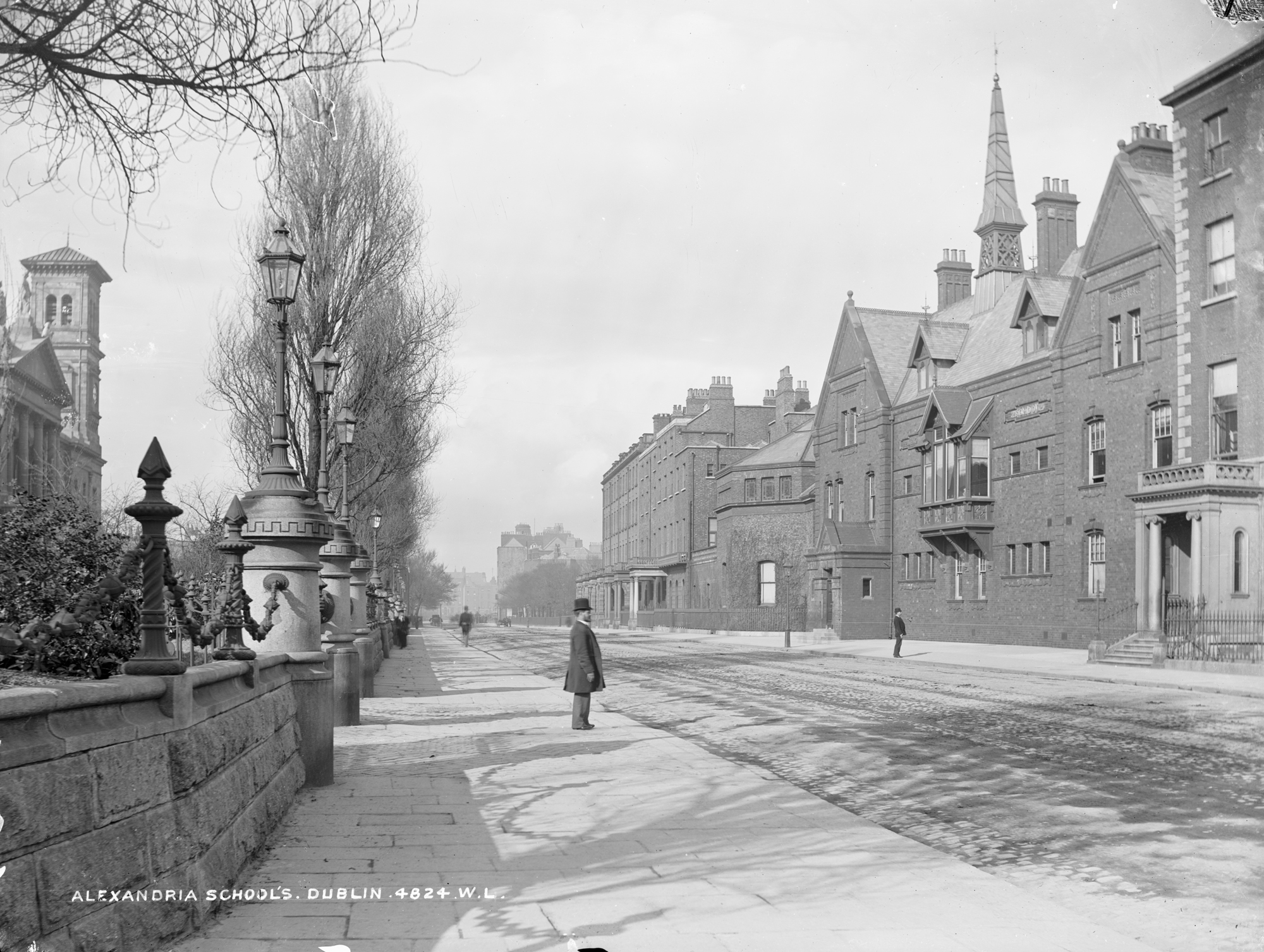
Alexandra College, circa 1890

In 1839 a row of houses on Leeson Street was demolished, which opened up a thoroughfare from St Stephen's Green to create Earlsfort Terrace. From 1843, building sites were leased by Lord Clonmell, also known as Baron Earlsfort, for whom the street is named. The entire site, which had previously been occupied by Clonmell House, was purchased by Benjamin Lee Guinness. In 1863, Guinness then sold the site to the Dublin Exhibition and Winter Garden Company to be used for the International Exhibition of Arts and Manufactures. Remnants of the exhibition building can still be seen in the National Concert Hall (NCH), which now occupies the site. The NCH building, dating from 1914, had been part of the University College Dublin campus, which was located on Earlsfort Terrace until the 1970s.

The Georgian houses on the corner of St Stephen's Green and Earlsfort Terrace were demolished between 1964 and 1971 and were replaced with a collection of modern office blocks including Canada House designed by architect Brian Hogan.

The houses opposite, on the West side of the street were replaced with Saint Stephens Green House, built as the headquarters of the Irish Sugar Company. The scheme also involved the demolition of numerous properties on Leeson Street including the Magdalen Asylum Chapel.

The Conrad Hotel and numerous office blocks were built during the 1980s, partially on the former site of Alexandra College, which occupied buildings on part of the West side of the street.

== See also ==
- List of streets and squares in Dublin
