= Thomas Scott, 2nd Earl of Clonmell =

Irish peer and politician

Thomas Scott, 2nd Earl of Clonmell (15 August 1783 – 18 January 1838), styled Lord Earlsfort between 1793 and 1798, was an Irish peer and politician.

Scott was the only son of John Scott, 1st Earl of Clonmell, Lord Chief Justice of the King's Bench for Ireland, by his second wife, Margaret, daughter of Patrick Lawless, a Dublin banker. He became known by the courtesy title Lord Earlsfort when his father was elevated to an earldom in 1793.

Scott succeeded his father in the earldom in 1798, aged 14. As this was an Irish peerage, he was still eligible for election to the British House of Commons. In 1807 he was returned to parliament for New Romney, a seat he held until 1812.

Lord Clonmell married Lady Henrietta Louisa, daughter of George Greville, 2nd Earl of Warwick, on 9 February 1805. They had two sons and seven daughters. Lady Louisa Augusta Scott, Lady Caroline Sophia Scott, Lady Frances Mary Scott, Lady Harriet Margaret Scott, Lady Sophia Louisa Scott, John Henry Scott 3rd Earl of Clonmell, Colonel Hon.Charles Grantham Scott and Lady Augusta Anne Scott. He died at North Aston, Oxfordshire, in January 1838, aged 54, and was succeeded by his eldest son, John.

Parliament of the United Kingdom
Preceded by William Windham; John Perring	Member of Parliament for New Romney; 1807–1812; With: Hon. George Ashburnham	Succeeded by Sir John Duckworth; William Mitford
Peerage of Ireland
Preceded by John Henry Scott	Earl of Clonmell; 1798–1838	Succeeded by John Henry Scott
