= George Nairn =

Irish artist

- Self portrait dated 1834
- Born: 1799
- Died: 25 January 1850 (aged 50–51)
- Known for: animal painter

George Nairn (1799 – 25 January 1850) was an Irish animal painter.

== Life and family ==
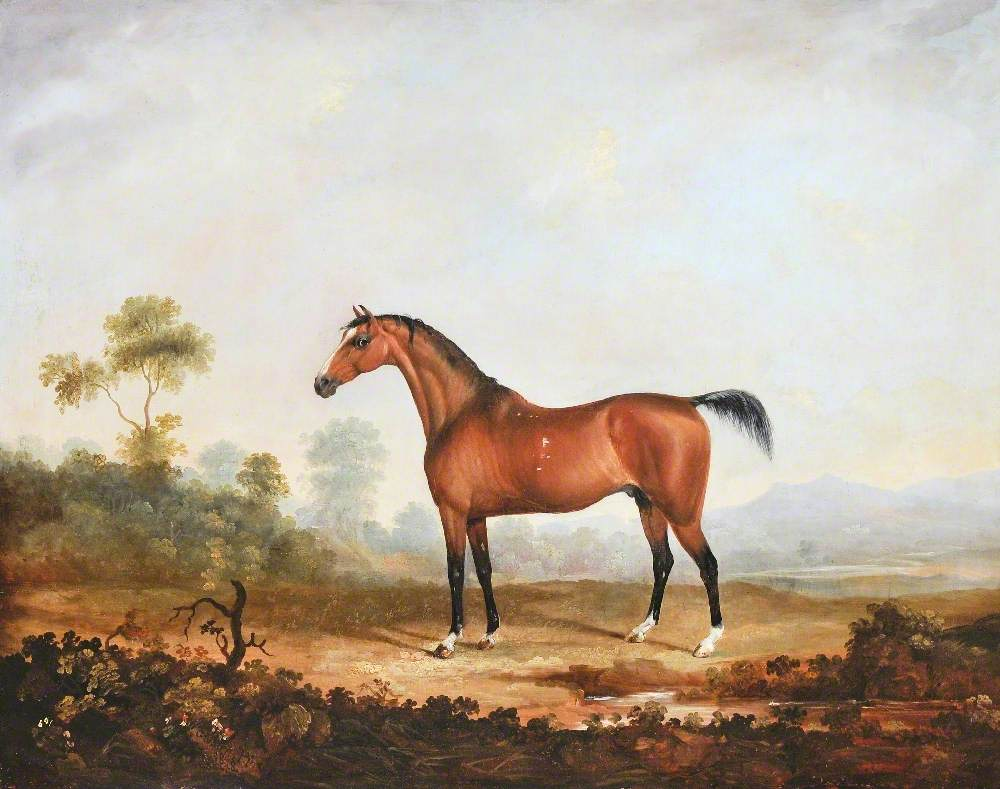
Lord Anglesey's Horse 'Cossack' held by the National Trust

George Nairn was born in Dublin in 1799. He entered the Dublin Society Schools in July 1813.

Nairn married, Cecilia Margaret Campbell, a painter and modeller. His father-in-law was the painter, John Henry Campbell. Both their daughter, Anna Langley Nairn (later Armstrong), and their son, John Campbell Nairn (born 1831), became artists.

Nairn died on 25 January 1850, following a long painful illness. His son donated a painting by Nairn of a dog to the National Gallery of Ireland in 1899.

== Career ==
He established himself as a landscape, portrait and animal painter in Dublin, gaining the most success from his animal painting. He was particularly sought after for his horse and dog paintings. There were not many horse painters in Ireland, with Daniel Quigley being one that predates Nairn. Other animal painters of the period included Thomas Robinson (1770-1810), Michael Angelo Hayes, and William Osborne. Osborne is considered the "natural successor" to Nairn.

In 1826, Nairn was featured in the first exhibition of the Royal Hibernian Academy with Group of favourite Dogs belonging to Francis Johnston. He exhibited regularly until a year before his death in 1849. He was elected an associate in 1828, but never a full member. Strickland likens his work to that to George Stubbs, and others argue his work shows the influence of John Ferneley.

Considering the number of paintings he exhibited, the number of surviving, identified Nairn paintings is low. He did not routinely sign his work, and it has been suggested that many of his works could have been attributed to other animal painters of the time. In the early 2000s, a new work was attributed to him, The interior of the Stables at Carton, County Kildare; a liveried groom, Lord Charles William FitzGerald (1819-1887) and his sister Lady Jane Seymour FitzGerald dated circa 1825.
