= John Scott, 1st Earl of Clonmell =

Irish barrister and judge

John Scott
- Earl of Clonmell
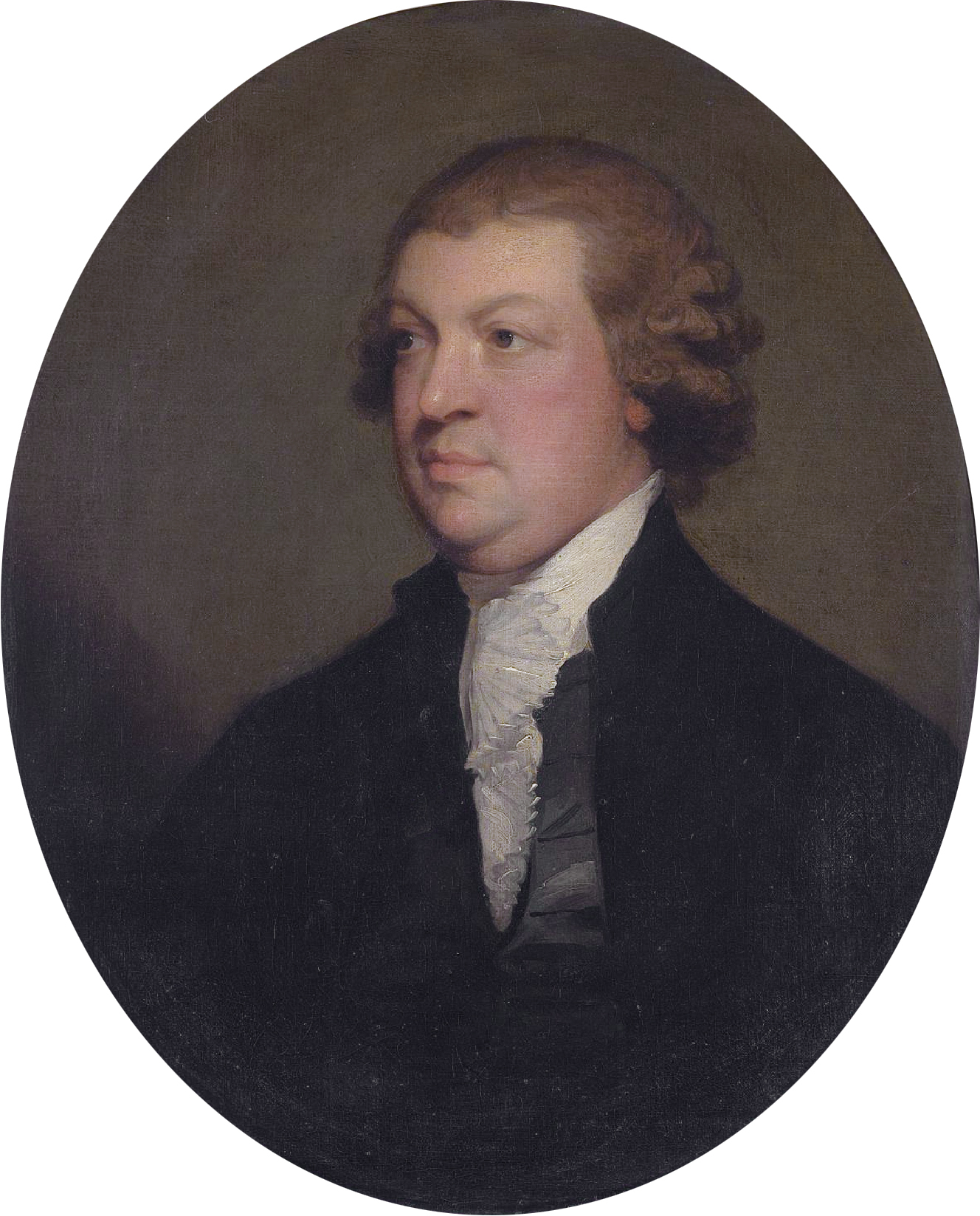
- John Scott, 1st Earl of Clonmel by Gilbert Stuart
- Born: 8 June 1739
- Died: 23 May 1798 (aged 58)

John Scott, 1st Earl of Clonmell PC (Ire) KC SL (8 June 1739 – 23 May 1798), known as The Lord Earlsfort between 1784 and 1789 and as The Viscount Clonmell between 1789 and 1793, was an Irish barrister and judge. Sometimes known as "Copperfaced Jack", he was Lord Chief Justice of the King's Bench for Ireland from 1784 to 1798.

== Early life ==
Scott was the third son of Thomas Scott (died 1763) of Scottsborough (made up of the townlands of Mohubber, Modeshill and Urlings), County Tipperary, by his wife, Rachel (died 1784), daughter of Mark Prim (died 1745) of Johnswell, County Kilkenny. His parents were cousins, being two of the grandchildren of Nicholas Purcell, 13th Baron of Loughmoe.. His elder brother was the uncle of Bernard Phelan, who established Château Phélan Ségur, and Dean John Scott, who first planted the gardens open to the public at Ballyin, County Waterford and was married to a niece of Clonmell's political ally, Henry Grattan.

While at Kilkenny College, John Scott stood up to the tormentor of a boy named Hugh Carleton, who grew up to be Viscount Carleton of Clare, Scott's fellow Chief Justice. They became firm friends, and Carleton's father, who was known as the 'King of Cork', due to his wealth and influence, invited him to their home and became Scott's patron. In 1756, Mr Carleton sent both the young men off, with equal allowances, to study at Trinity College Dublin and then the Middle Temple in London. On being called to the Irish Bar in 1765, Scott's eloquence secured him a position that enabled him to pay £300 a year to his patron, Francis Carleton, who through a series of disappointments had at the same time as Scott's success been declared bankrupt. He continued to gratefully support his patron until Hugh Carleton was financially able to insist that he take up the payments to his father. Scott in later life turned against Hugh, describing him in his diary as a "worthless wretch".

== Career ==
Admitted to King's Inns in 1765, he was entitled to practice as a barrister. In 1769 he was elected as the Member of Parliament for Mullingar, a seat he held until 1783. The following year he was made a K.C. In 1772 he was Counsel to the Board of Revenue, an extremely lucrative office: in return, he was expected to defend the Government's policy, which he did with great energy. In 1774 he was appointed Solicitor-General (1774–1777) for Ireland. Three years later, he was elected a Privy Councillor and Attorney-General for Ireland (1774–1782). He was dismissed from the latter position in 1782 for refusing to acknowledge the right of England to legislate for Ireland. In 1775, he was awarded the honorary degree of Doctor of Law (LL.D.) by Trinity College, Dublin. He held the office of Prime Serjeant-at-Law of Ireland between 1783 and 1784. He was Clerk of the Pleas of the Court of Exchequer (Ireland) in 1783 and was elected Member of Parliament for Portarlington between 1783 and 1784.

In 1784, Scott was created 1st Baron Earlsfort of Lisson-Earl, County Tipperary, following his appointment to Lord Chief Justice of the King's Bench. In 1789, he was created 1st Viscount Clonmell, of Clonmel, County Tipperary and in 1793 he was created 1st Earl of Clonmell. By the 1790s he had an annual income of £20,000. Due to heavy drinking and overeating, he became grossly overweight, and this no doubt contributed to his early death, although his diary shows that he made frequent good resolutions about living a more temperate life. He wrote that too many of his colleagues, including Philip Tisdall, his predecessor as Attorney General, had died through failing to moderate their drinking as they grew older, but it seems that he could not take his own good advice. His heavy drinking is also thought to have been responsible for the red face which earned him the nickname "Copper-faced Jack" (which is commemorated in a famous Dublin nightclub, Copper Face Jacks).

According to fencing author Captain Anthony Gordon, the idea for the invention of bayonet fencing in Ireland (and in all the British Isles) came from Scott, and was only later developed and propagated by Gordon. The Irish fencing treatise "A Few Mathematical and Critical Remarks on the Sword" (Dublin: 1781), is dedicated to Scott. In its opening pages, the author writes to him: "if I knew but one man in the kingdom, to have a sounder judgment and a finer imagination, a more humane and expanded heart, and a more spirited and judicious arm, I should have been still more presumptuous than I am, in prefixing YOUR NAME to so trifling a production". During his time as Attorney General, Scott publicly defended the custom of duelling, and encouraged legal tolerance towards duelists who had acted honourably and fought for a good cause. However, Scott acted unfavourably towards the notorious duelist George Robert "Fighting" Fitzgerald, who published a poem while in prison lampooning and attacking Scott.

He regarded most of his judicial colleagues with suspicion and dislike, which extended even to former friends like Hugh Carleton. Of his junior colleagues in the Court of King's Bench (Ireland), he admired Samuel Bradstreet, but dismissed William Henn (with some justification) as a fool, while John Bennett, a man noted for independence of mind, he marked down as an enemy. After 1792, following the death of Bennett and the retirement of Henn, Scott finally became complete master in his own court. His rival William Downes, 1st Baron Downes, who became Lord Chief Justice in 1803, he described as "cunning and vain, and one who wishes me ill".

In Court his manner was arrogant, and he often treated barristers with a complete lack of courtesy. His rudeness to one barrister called Hackett led to the Bar passing a resolution that no barrister would appear in his Court until he apologised. Clonmell had no choice but to submit.

In 1797, in the last conversation he would have with his wife's cousin, Valentine Lawless, 2nd Baron Cloncurry, he exclaimed: 'My dear Val, I have been a fortunate man in life. I am a Chief Justice and an Earl; but, believe me, I would rather be beginning the world as a young (chimney) sweep'. He died the following year on 23 May 1798.

== Legacy ==
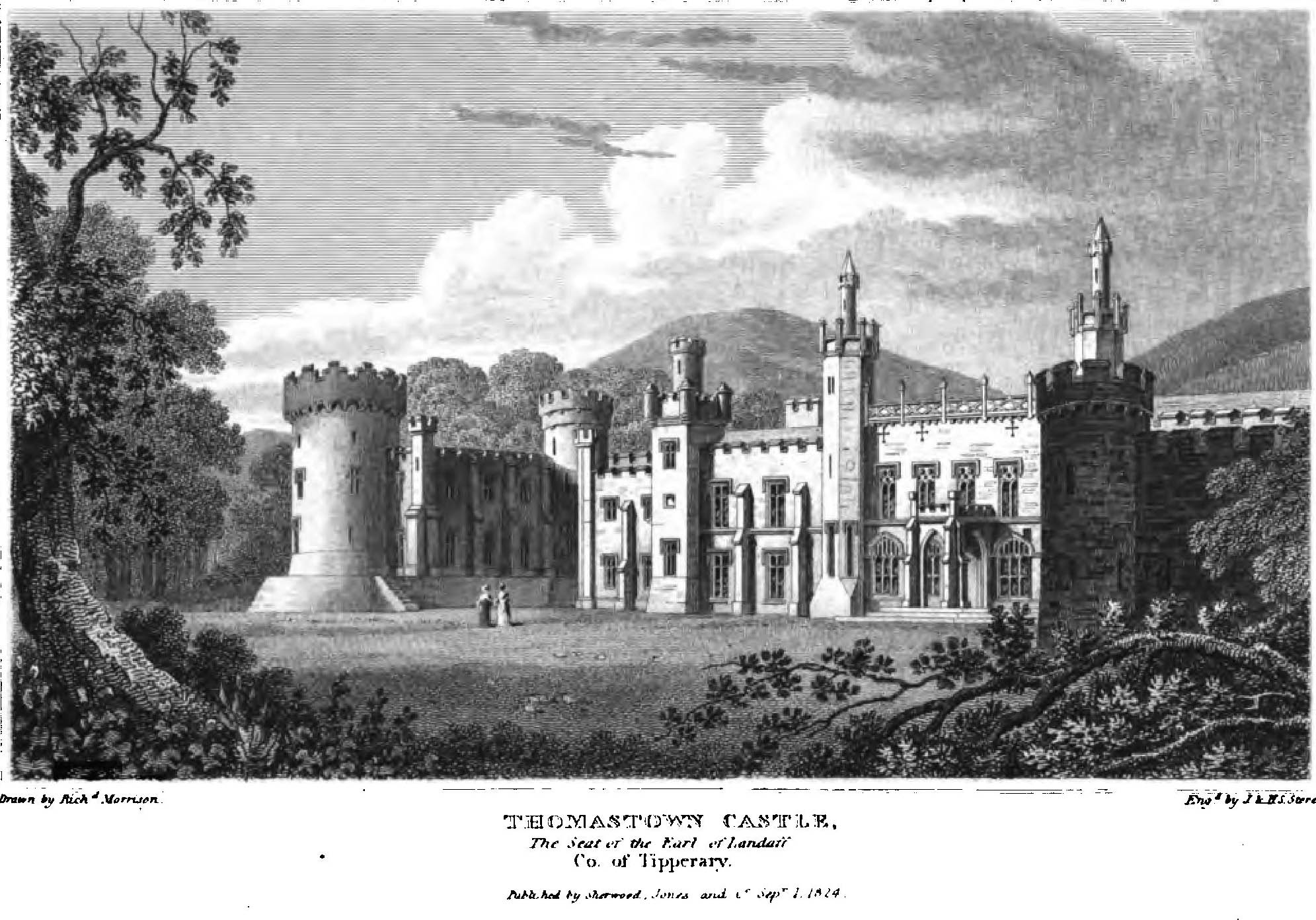
Thomastown Castle

Scott lived at Clonmell House, 17 Harcourt Street, Dublin. He also kept a country residence, Temple Hill House, in Blackrock. County Dublin which later became an orphanage and is now a private residence known as Neptune house. Clonmell Street in Dublin is named in his honour, as is Earlsfort Terrace, also in Dublin. He had also gained a reputation for being an experienced duellist.

In 1768, he married the widowed Mrs Catherine Anna Maria Roe (died 1771), daughter of Thomas Mathew, of Thomastown Castle, County Tipperary and sister of Francis Mathew, 1st Earl Landaff. In 1779, he remarried Margaret Lawless (1763–1829), daughter and eventual heiress of Patrick Lawless, of Dublin, a banker. He left a son and heir, Thomas, and a daughter, Charlotte, by his second marriage. Charlotte married John Lygon, 3rd Earl Beauchamp in 1814 but had no children.

=== Character ===
Many of Scott's contemporaries viewed him harshly: one verdict was that "it is hard to believe that the office of Lord Chief Justice could be attained by a man most superficially read in the law... (whose character was) wholly at variance with truth and justice". F. Elrington Ball described him as "an extraordinarily able man and an equally ambitious one. As he has revealed to us in his diary he had from the first no misgiving as to the object of his life being personal success, and although he wore out his mind and body in reaching his goal he made it against desperate odds."

M. J. Craig said of Scott's diary – 'Parts of the diary are extremely funny, but too long to quote here; and other reasons forbid.' Its publication did considerable damage to his reputation: the public were shocked by the savage attacks on his judicial colleagues, including some, like Hugh Carleton, who had always regarded him as a friend.

Scott was a prominent figure in Jonah Barrington's Memoirs, and the butt of many of John Philpot Currans jokes. He was also the subject of a play by John (Purcell) O'Donovan, Copperfaced Jack (1963). Copper Face Jacks, founded in 1996, is a popular Dublin nightclub on Harcourt Street (part of the Jackson Court Hotel).

Parliament of Ireland
Preceded by Sir Richard Steele	Member of Parliament for Mullingar; 1769–1783; With: Sir Richard Steele 1769–1776; Richard Underwood 1776–1779; Sir Skeffington Smyth 1779–1783	Succeeded by Francis Hardy; John Doyle
Preceded by Sir Roger Palmer; Joseph Dawson	Member of Parliament for Portarlington; 1783–1784; With: Thomas Kelly	Succeeded by Sir Boyle Roche; Robert Hobart
Legal offices
Preceded by Godfrey Lill	Solicitor-General for Ireland; 1774–1777	Succeeded by Robert Hellen
Preceded by Philip Tisdall	Attorney-General for Ireland; 1777–1782	Succeeded by Barry Yelverton
Preceded by The Lord Annaly	Lord Chief Justice of the King's Bench for Ireland; 1784–1798	Succeeded by The Lord Kilwarden
Peerage of Ireland
New creation	Earl of Clonmell; 1793–1798	Succeeded by Thomas Scott
New creation	Viscount Clonmell; 1789–1798	Succeeded by Thomas Scott
New creation	Baron Earlsfort; 1784–1798	Succeeded by Thomas Scott
