= Dublin Streets: a Vendor of Books =

Oil on canvas painting by Walter Osborne

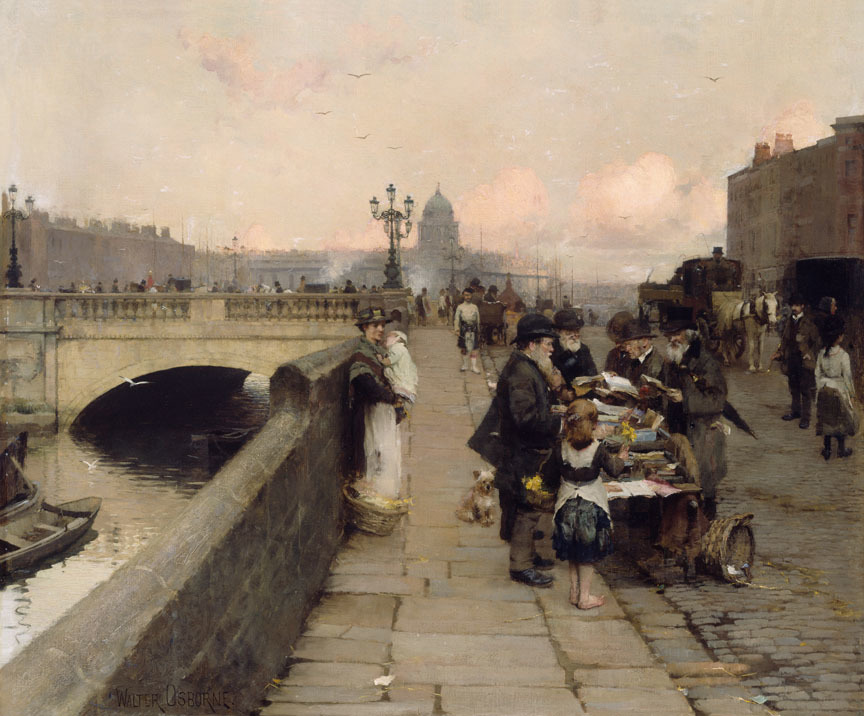
Dublin Streets: a Vendor of Book, Walter Osborne, Oil on canvas, 80 x 90 cm, 1889. National Gallery of Ireland

Dublin Streets: a Vendor of Books is an 80 x 90 cm oil on canvas painting by the Irish artist Walter Osborne, completed in 1889 and housed in the National Gallery of Ireland. It is one of a series of paintings Osborne made at the time emphasising the plight and hardships of Dublin's poor.

== Description ==
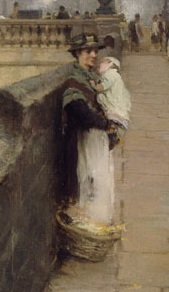
Detail

The painting shows a bookseller's stall, set up on Aston Quay, looking eastwards towards O'Connell Bridge with a hazy impressionistic view of James Gandon’s Custom house. A mother leaning against the wall holds a child in her arms. She looks tired and anxious, and appears to be connected with the young barefoot girl who approaches the bookseller's customers, offering daffodils for sale. That they have been unsuccessful attracting buyers is indicated by the basket full of flowers on the ground by the woman.

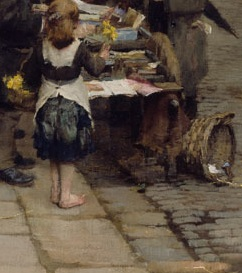
Detail

Other details in the bustling scene include traffic (horses, carts and pedestrians) passing over O'Connell Bridge, and a barge and skiff just coming into view as they travel up the River Liffey. To the right of the main figures are a number of horse-drawn carts awaiting fares. A number of men wearing kilts gather at a corner.

== Series ==
The painting is one of a series of paintings of Dublin street scenes the artist completed around the time, during visits home from his residence in England. They were later exhibited as a group at the Royal Academy. The series was completed in oils in his studio, using detailed pencil sketches, and also on photographs, a modern approach for a painter at the time. Like the other works in the series, Dublin Streets is documentary in subject matter, influenced in part by the French Naturalist and Realist painters.

== Reception ==
Although highly regarded today, these documentary, street paintings depicting everyday life were not commercially successful, and Osborne supplemented his income through portrait paintings, which were not as artistically satisfying. However, it remains an invaluable faithful record the quay in 1889; O'Connell bridge had just been rebuilt, while the view of Custom's house was overshadowed in 1891 by the Loopline Viaduct.

== Sources ==
- Bhreathnach-Lynch, Sighle. 50 Works of Irish Art You Need to Know. Dublin: Gill & MacMillan, 2016. ISBN 978-0-7171-6655-8
- Potterton, Homan. "Masterpieces from National Gallery of Ireland. A Loan Exhibition at The National Gallery, London 27 March - 27 May 1985". Dublin: National Gallery of Ireland, 1985. ISBN 0-9031-6218-0
