= William Osborne (artist) =

Irish artist

- Born: February 1823; Dublin, Ireland
- Died: 13 April 1901 (aged 78)
- Known for: portrait and animal painter

William Osborne (February 1823 – 13 April 1901) was an Irish portrait and animal painter.

== Life and family ==
William Osborne was born in 29 Pleasants Street, Dublin in February 1823. His father, Richard William Osborne, was a clerk in the wholesale haberdashers, Messrs Ferrier, Pollock & Co. of Fishamble Street. His mother was Hannah Charlotte Keane. He was distantly related to the watercolourist, Frederic William Burton. He had at least one brother, Edward.

They were orphaned at a young age, with Osborne being raised by an uncle, Mr Parker, a member of the Moravian Church. He was sent to a Moravian school in Leeds. Osborne began work as a clerk in the same company in his father but his artistic talent was recognised and he entered the Royal Hibernian Academy (RHA), Abbey Street as a student in 1845.

Osborne lived and worked at 29 Pleasants Street until 1852 when he moved to Heytesbury Street, and then to 47 Dawson Street in 1854. He lastly moved to 5 Cornish Terrace, Castlewood Avenue, Rathmines in 1861, living and working from this address until his death on 13 April 1901. He is buried in Mount Jerome.

In 1855, Osborne married Ann Jane Woods (died 1910), whose family originally came from County Limerick. They had three children, two sons, Charles (1856–1936) and Walter Frederick, and a daughter, Violet (1866–1893). Walter Frederick also became an artist. His son exhibited a portrait of Osborne at the RHA in 1898. After the death of their daughter during childbirth, Osborne and his wife raised their grand daughter, Violet Stockley, from age 4 months.

== Career ==
Portrait of a dog named "Garryowen" (1880)

Osborne held his first exhibition at the RHA in 1851, exhibiting 3 paintings: A boy, A girl, and A dog. Early in his career he painted portraits, but soon specialised as an animal painter, specifically of dogs and horses. He would study his subjects for hours, with Walter G. Strickland commenting that his paintings of dogs were "full of life and vitality, well-drawn and in good colouring, often with touches of humour". In 1854, he was elected an associate of the RHA. He exhibited with the academy regularly until his death, and was elected a full member in July 1868.

He gained a reputation for his animal painting, as has been described as the "natural successor to the animal painter George Nairn". He had a constant stream of commissions from horse owners, hunt masters and trainers. He was also commissioned by officers in cavalry regiments within Ireland. The land war of the 1880s impacted his equestrian painting commissions, which is when he began painting more dogs. The creation of new breeds of dogs at this time resulted in a demand for dog painting from breeders. He also frequently visited the Royal Zoological Gardens, Dublin, sketching and painting many of the animals. He also taught at the RHA schools, with W. B. Yeats among his pupils.

== Selected works ==
- The Italian greyhounds of the Hon. Mrs Plunkett (1863)
- Favourite horses of the earl of Charlemont (1863)
- Study of a tiger's head in the Royal Zoological Gardens, Phoenix Park (1873)
- "Bob": charger of the 14th Hussars (1874), hanging in the King's Royal Hussars, Peninsula Barracks, Winchester, England
- "The Moor": a charger of the Scots Greys (1874)
- The Curraghmore Hunt commissioned by William Lygon Pakenham, 4th earl of Longford
- The Ward Hunt (1880), now held in the National Gallery of Ireland (NGI)
- An old huntsman: the late Charles Brindley, Ward Union Hunt (1880)
- Portrait of a dog named "Garryowen", now held in the NGI
