= Walter Osborne =

Irish painter

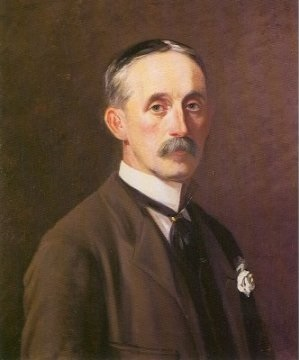
- Born: 17 June 1859; Rathmines, Dublin
- Died: 24 April 1903 (aged 43)
- Known for: Oil landscape
- Awards: Taylor Prize; Royal Hibernian Academy

Walter Frederick Osborne (17 June 1859 – 24 April 1903) was an Irish impressionist and Post-Impressionism landscape and portrait painter, best known for his documentary depictions of late 19th century working class life. Most of his paintings are figurative and focus on women, children, the elderly, the poor, and the day-to-day life of ordinary people on Dublin streets, as well as series of rural scenes. He also produced city-scapes, which he painted from both sketches and photographs. A prolific artist, he produced oils, watercolours, and numerous pencil sketches.

Osborne's talent was evident as a young man and he travelled widely in his youth; studying at the Academie Royale des Beaux Arts in Antwerp. He became a member of the Royal Hibernian Academy after an early showing. Later, he spent time in rural England and Brittany, where he became acquainted with the style of the impressionists. Osborne produced works in oil, water-colour, pastel and pencil. His main source of income was portraiture, landscapes and depictions of animals, but he is today better known for his documentary depictions of Ireland's working class poor.

Osborne had an engaging, charismatic personality and was well thought of in a variety of social circles. He died from pneumonia at 43 years, before achieving his full potential. Today he is regarded as a major Irish artist.

== Life ==
=== Early life ===
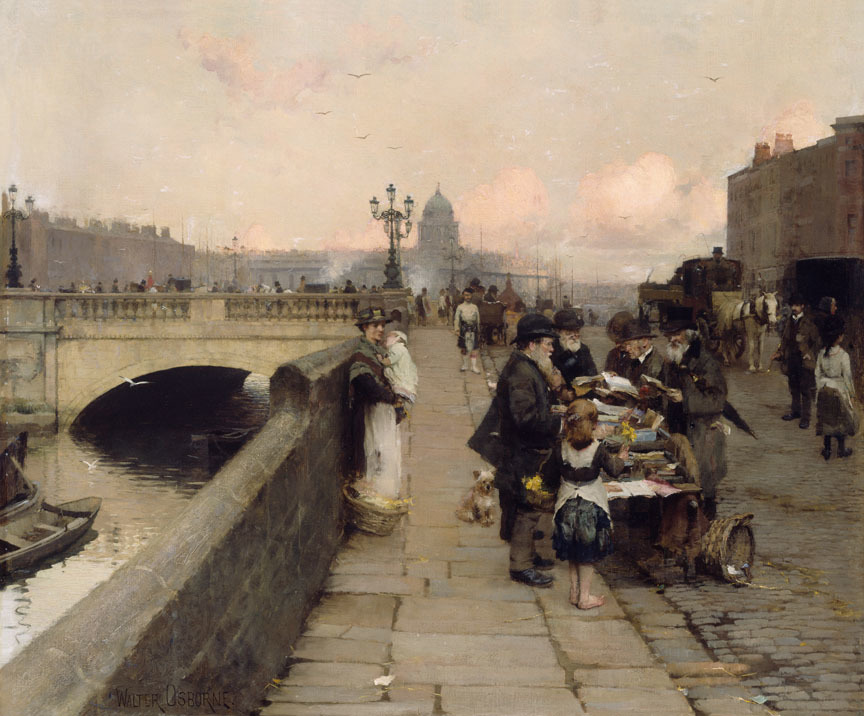
Dublin Streets: a Vendor of Books, 1889. From a series of studies of Dublin working-class people, which emphasised the plight and hardships of the city's poor

Walter Osborne was born in Rathmines, Dublin, the second of three sons of William Osborne, a successful animal painter who specialised in portraying horses and dogs for the then prosperous Irish landlords. By the 1880s, many landlords had hit economic difficulties, and William had to focus on painting mostly dogs.

Walter learned from his father that there was money to be earned from painting animals, and he produced quite a few; including of children with their pets, notably his 1885 A New Arrival, and a series of impressionistic works on cows. Yet, according to art historian Campbell, in these paintings, "Osborne eschews the overly sentimental or literary quality of much Victorian genre painting, and displays a more down-to-earth, realistic approach, and a mood of gentleness."

He was educated at Rathmines School and at the Royal Hibernian Academy school.

=== Success ===
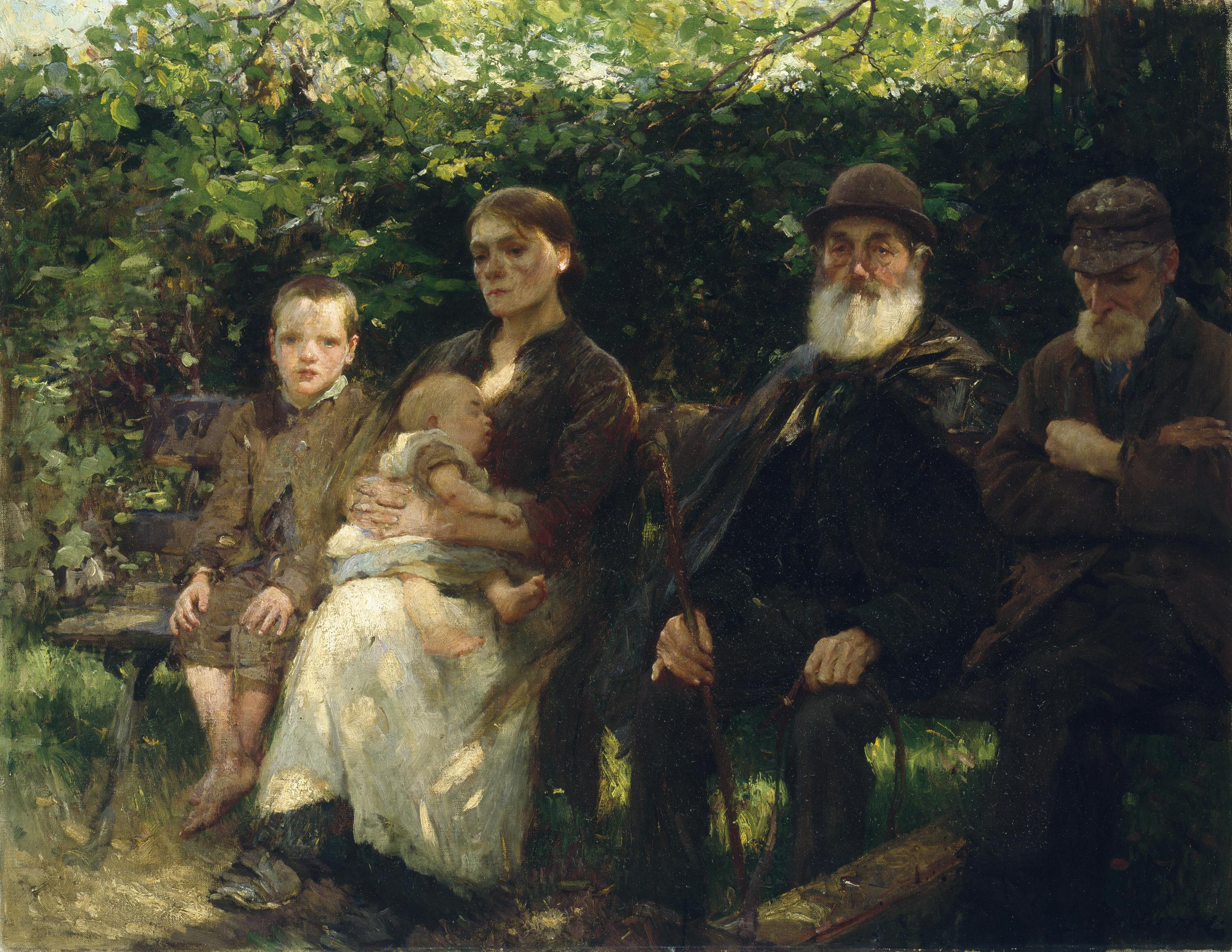
In a Dublin Park, Light and Shade, 1895

He won the Taylor Prize in 1881 and 1882, the highest student honour in Ireland of the time, while studying at the Koninklijke Academie voor Schone Kunsten in Antwerp. He was influenced by the Flemish painter Rubens, and the French realist, plein-air painter, Jules Bastien-Lepage, as well as Berthe Morisot. In 1883, Osborne moved from Antwerp to Brittany where he painted his famous Apple Gathering, Quimperlé, now in the National Gallery of Ireland. Soon after, he moved to England where he worked alongside Nathaniel Hill and Augustus Burke at Walberswick. During his period he often returned to Dublin to make preparatory sketches for what became his most renowned series, of the everyday lives of the city's poor. Although highly regarded today, these documentary, street paintings were not commercially successful, and Osborne supplemented his income through portrait paintings of the middle class, which were not as artistically satisfying.

In 1886, he was elected to the Royal Hibernian Academy and received many commissions for portraits. This was an important source of income, as he had no private means of his own. After his sister died he was involved in looking after her daughter, and his own parents became increasingly financially dependent on him.

In 1892, he returned to Ireland to live in the family residence, and he also kept a studio at No. 7 St. Stephen's Green. He spent a considerable amount of time painting outdoors, in Dublin around St. Patrick's Cathedral or in the country. He was well liked in social circles and counted the surgeon Sir Thornely Stoker, brother of Bram Stoker, among his best friends.

=== Death ===
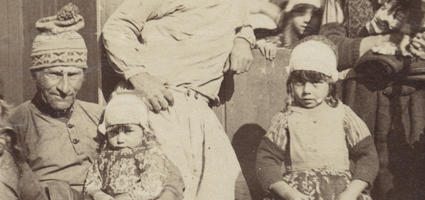
Photograph of Walter Osborne

His mother became ill in the early 1900s, and Walter spend significant periods caring for her. In 1903, while gardening, he overheated himself and caught a chill, which he neglected, and which developed into pneumonia. He died prematurely from the illness on April 24, 1903 at the age of 43. He is buried in Mount Jerome Cemetery.

Some critics have suggested that at the time of his death he was on the brink of his artistic maturity. His final work Tea in the Garden, a fusion of naturalism and impressionism, remained unfinished at his death and is now in the collection of the Hugh Lane Municipal Gallery in Dublin. Today his work is highly sought after by collectors.

Writing in 1943, and lamenting Osborne's early death, Stephen Gwynn wrote that he "never knew a man who seemed more likely than Walter Osborne to live to a happy and vigorous old age". His final work was "Tea in the Garden, described as "a beautiful combination of naturalism and impressionism remained unfinished at his death".

== Gallery ==
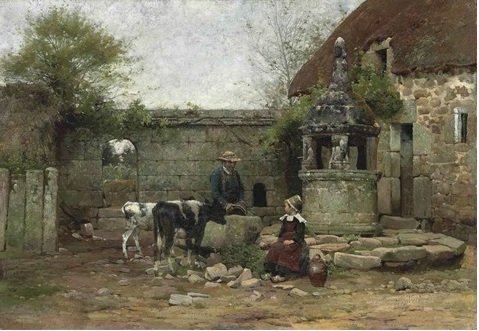
A Grey Morning in a Breton Farmyard, before 1884

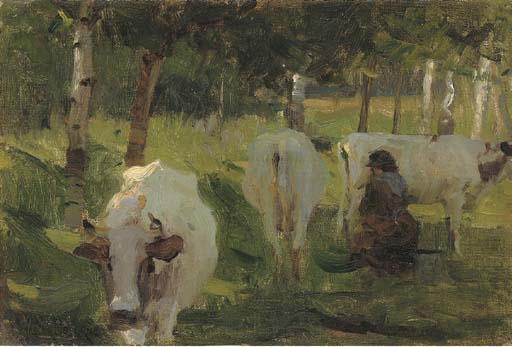
Milking Time

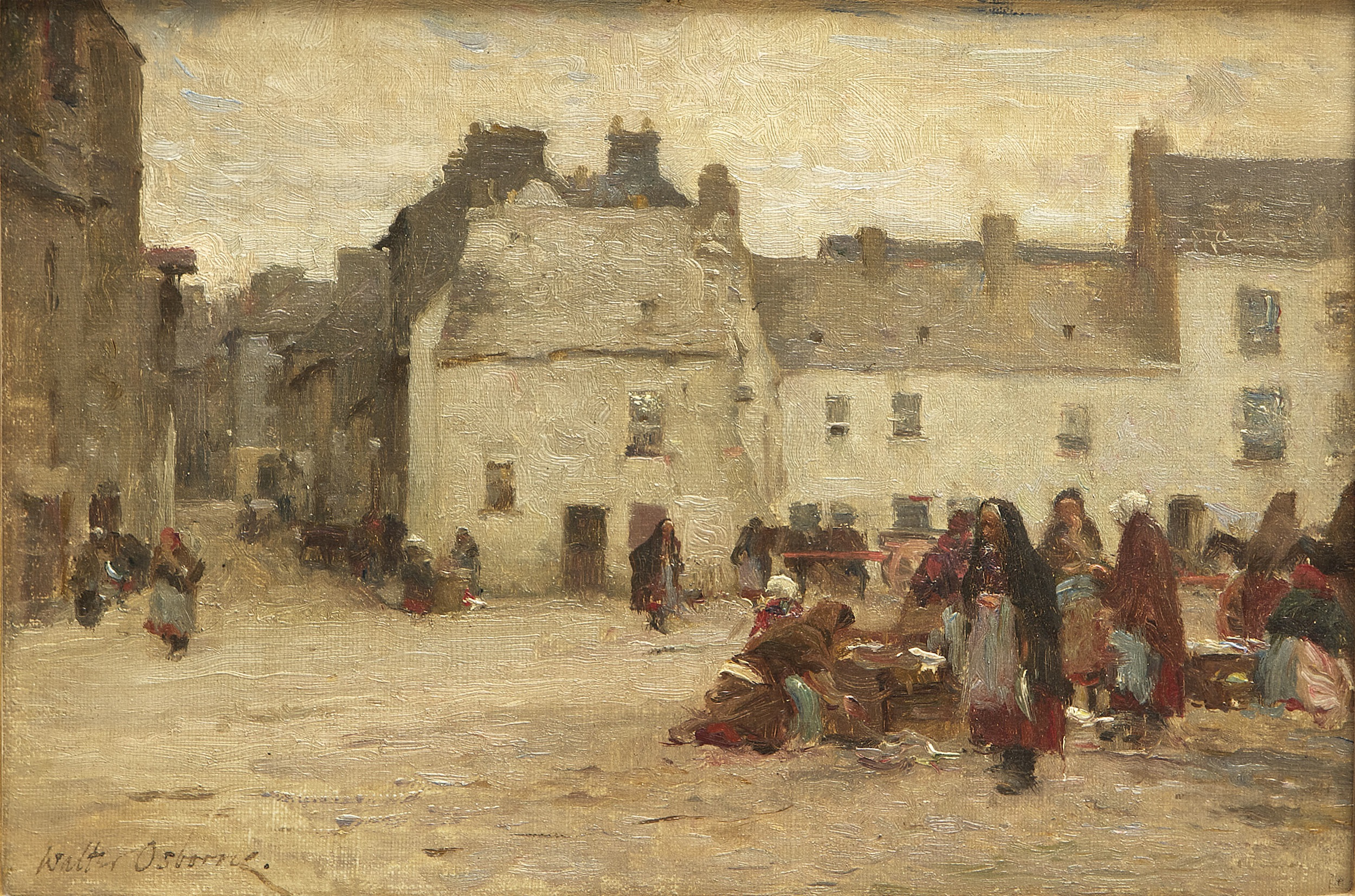
Galway Market Scene

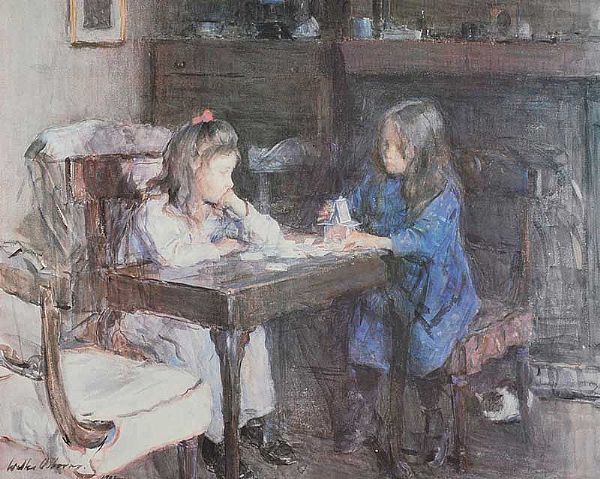
The Card Builders

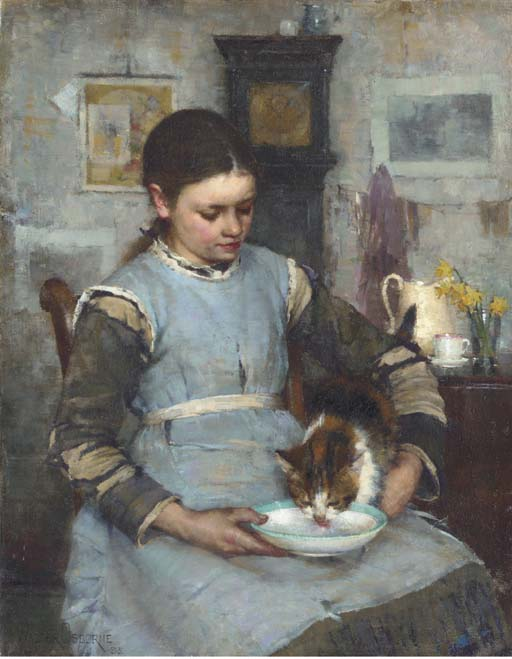
A New Arrival, 1885

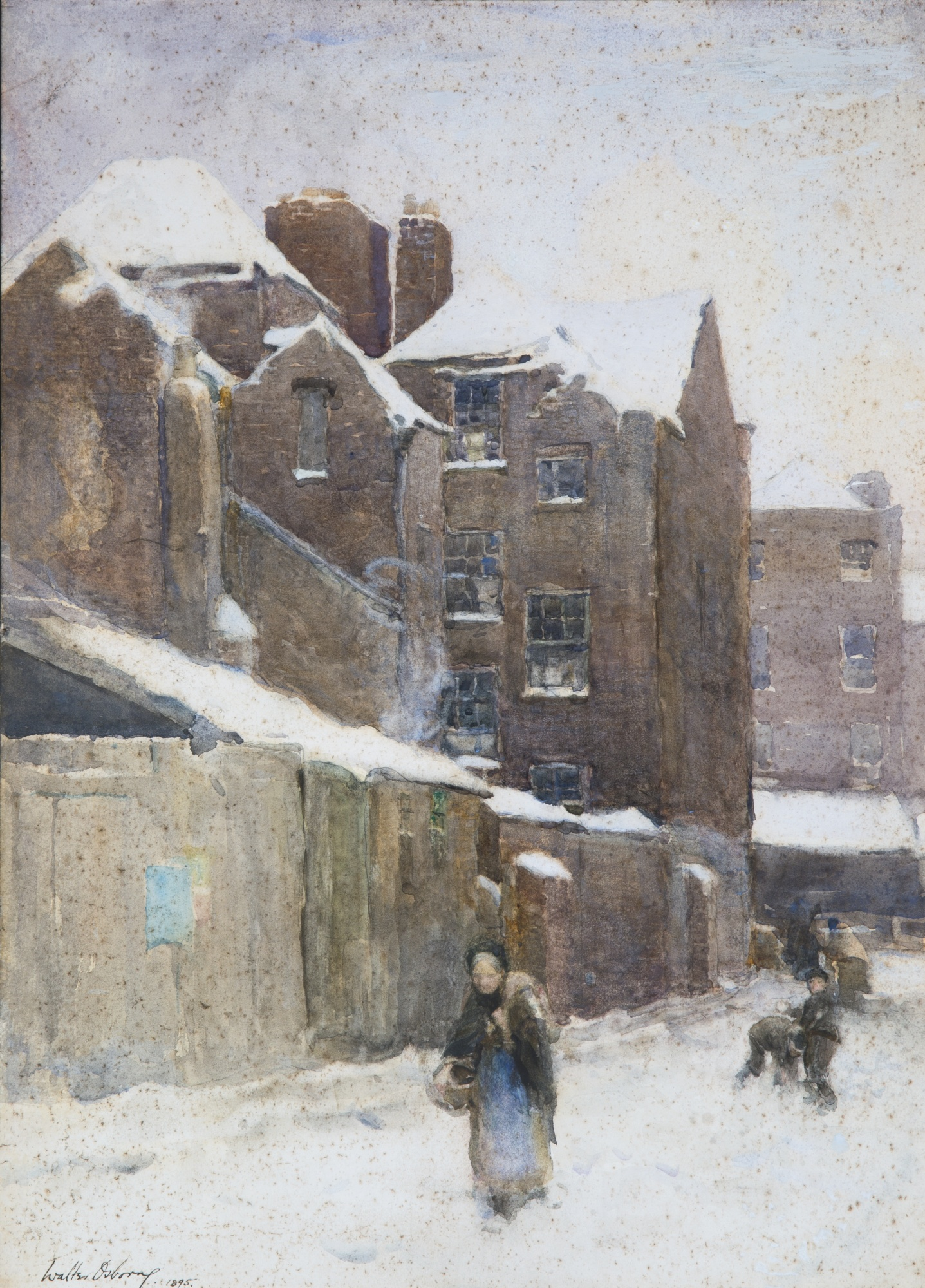
A Backstreet in the Snow, 1895

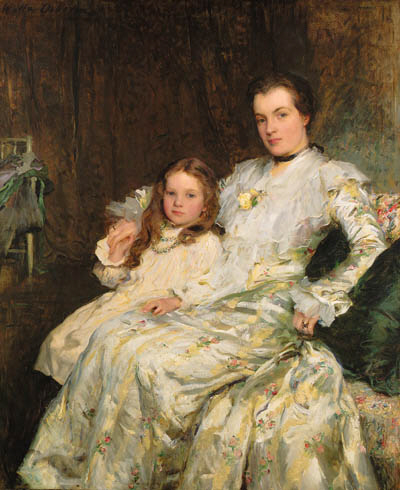
Portrait of Mrs Chadwyck-Healy and her Daughter, 1901

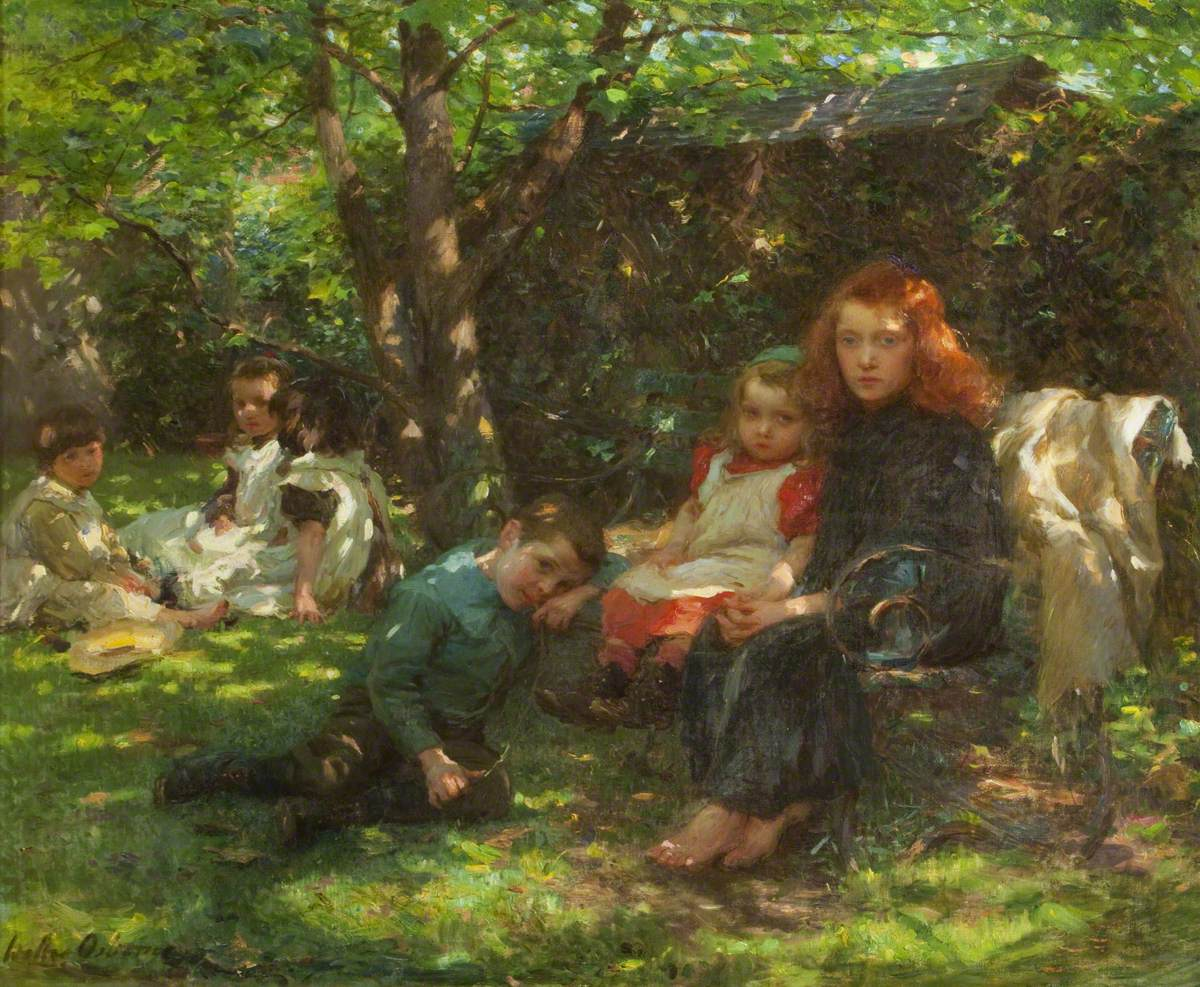
Summertime, 1901

The Flemish Cap, 1864-1902
