= Belleek Pottery =

Ceramics manufacturer in Northern Ireland

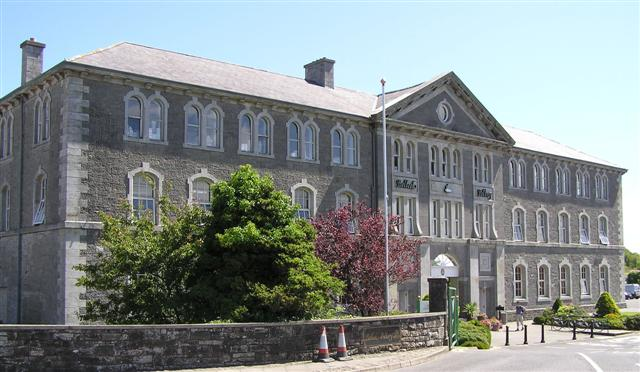
Belleek Pottery Headquarters.

Belleek Pottery Ltd is a porcelain company in Belleek, County Fermanagh, Northern Ireland, that began trading in 1884 as the Belleek Pottery Works Company Ltd. The factory produces Parian ware that is characterised by its thinness, slightly iridescent surface and body formulated with a significant proportion of frit.

== History ==
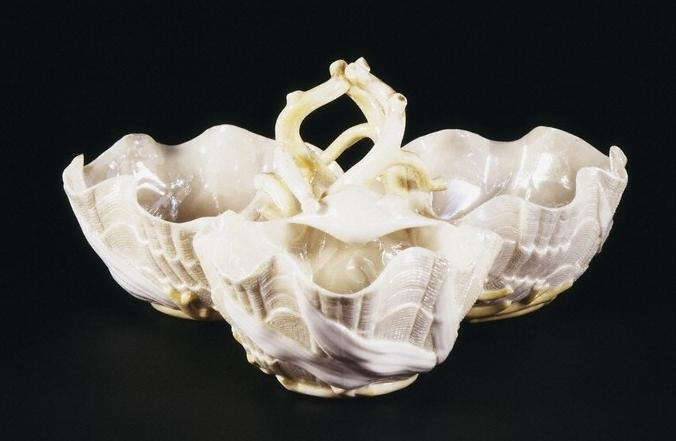
Dessert stand, 1857–1871, Belleek Porcelain Factory V&A Museum no. 3886-1901

Pottery in the Belleek region began around 1849, after John Caldwell Bloomfield inherited his father's estate at Castle Caldwell on Lower Lough Erne in County Fermanagh. Bloomfield sought to provide employment for his tenants, who had been affected by the Great Famine of 1845-52, and had already tried, without success, to establish industries in lace production and cement manufacturing.

Bloomfield's interest in ceramics was encouraged by the achievements of potters who exhibited at the Great Exhibition in London in 1851, and being an amateur mineralogist himself, he ordered a geological survey of his land. In 1852, it transpired that the area was rich in minerals, particularly feldspar and kaolin; the two ingredients necessary for making hard-bodied porcelain.

By 1853, he had arranged for his feldspar to be analysed in England at the Royal Porcelain Works in Worcester. The testing was organised through Robert William Armstrong, a London-based architect whom Bloomfield had probably met in Dublin, according to an article in the Irish Arts Review. Armstrong and W.H. Kerr (the owner of the Royal Porcelain Works) visited Castle Caldwell in 1854, and, according to the catalogue for the Dublin Exhibition of 1865 promoted the establishment of a factory in Belleek, highlighting its many advantages:

...the catalogue of the Dublin Exhibition of 1865 noted there was a sufficient water supply to drive a 100 h.p. water-wheel which powered all the necessary equipment; water transport was available by canal; there were "sober and industrious people in and around the village" as workers; clay for earthenware, flint for stoneware and shale for saggers existed nearby; turf for firing the kilns was locally available; only small imports of coal were necessary for completing the firings; finally, the limestone for building the factory was available in the neighbourhood.

Bloomfield went into partnership with Armstrong as well as Dublin merchant David McBirney, who had already established a successful drapery business at Hibernian House on Aston Quay in Dublin, and was also involved with the railways. Preparation of the site and building began in 1858, and "by 1860, the actual building had been constructed, but the factory was described in 1861 as "still uncompleted", with equipment to be installed." Production "probably" began in 1863, according to the Irish Arts Review.

Initially starting with domestic products, it wasn't until 1863 that small amounts of the Parian ware for which Belleek is famous for to this day, was first successfully produced. By 1865, the prestige of the company had increased enough that its market included Australia, Canada, England and the United States, and customers included the Prince of Wales, Queen Victoria and the nobility. Through McBirney's influence, the Enniskillen and Bundoran Railway line was built in 1866 which served Belleek, allowing coal to be delivered cheaply to fire the kilns, and allowed transport of the wares to the Irish ports.

In 1869, The Art Journal, an influential 19th-century magazine, devoted an article to the factory as "a sufficiently large producer of "artistic" objects to merit attention", noting the developments in the quality of the wares since 1865. Both Armstrong, and his wife, Anna Langley, were involved in creating many of the early popular designs.

=== Modern era ===
The artist and poet Eugene Sheerin worked at Belleek Pottery in the late 19th century. A Belleek dish with a reproduction of his painting "Innocence" (1879) is on display at the Royal Victoria & Albert museum London.

Belleek acquired Donegal Parian China in November 2000.

== Acquisitions ==
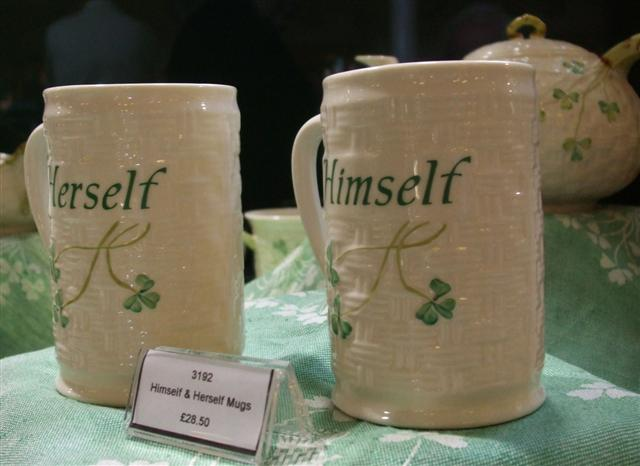
Belleek pottery showing common shamrock motif

The original owners had all died by 1884, and a local group of investors acquired the concern and named it Belleek Pottery Works Company Ltd. Master craftsmen Frederick Slater moved from England to Belleek in 1893 and by 1920 high quality porcelain was becoming the mainstay of the business. The company struggled throughout the First and Second World Wars, and concentrated on producing earthenware during these periods.

After the Second World War, Belleek Pottery stopped production of earthenware. The Pottery began the change from coal fired kilns to electric powered kilns from 1952. In 1983 the Industrial Development Board gave financial assistance to the company and installed Roger Troughton as the Managing Director. The following year Troughton made a successful bid for the sale of the company. In 1988, Dungannon-based Powerscreen International bought the company, and opened a visitor centre the following year.

== Today ==
The company changed ownership again in 1990. Dundalk-born US-based George G. Moore remains the owner, though the company is run locally by four directors. Since then Belleek Pottery has expanded its factory space, acquisitions of other companies, staff and turnover. Subsidiary companies now include Galway Crystal, Aynsley China and Donegal Parian China. It employs more than six hundred people and has an annual turnover of around £30 million.

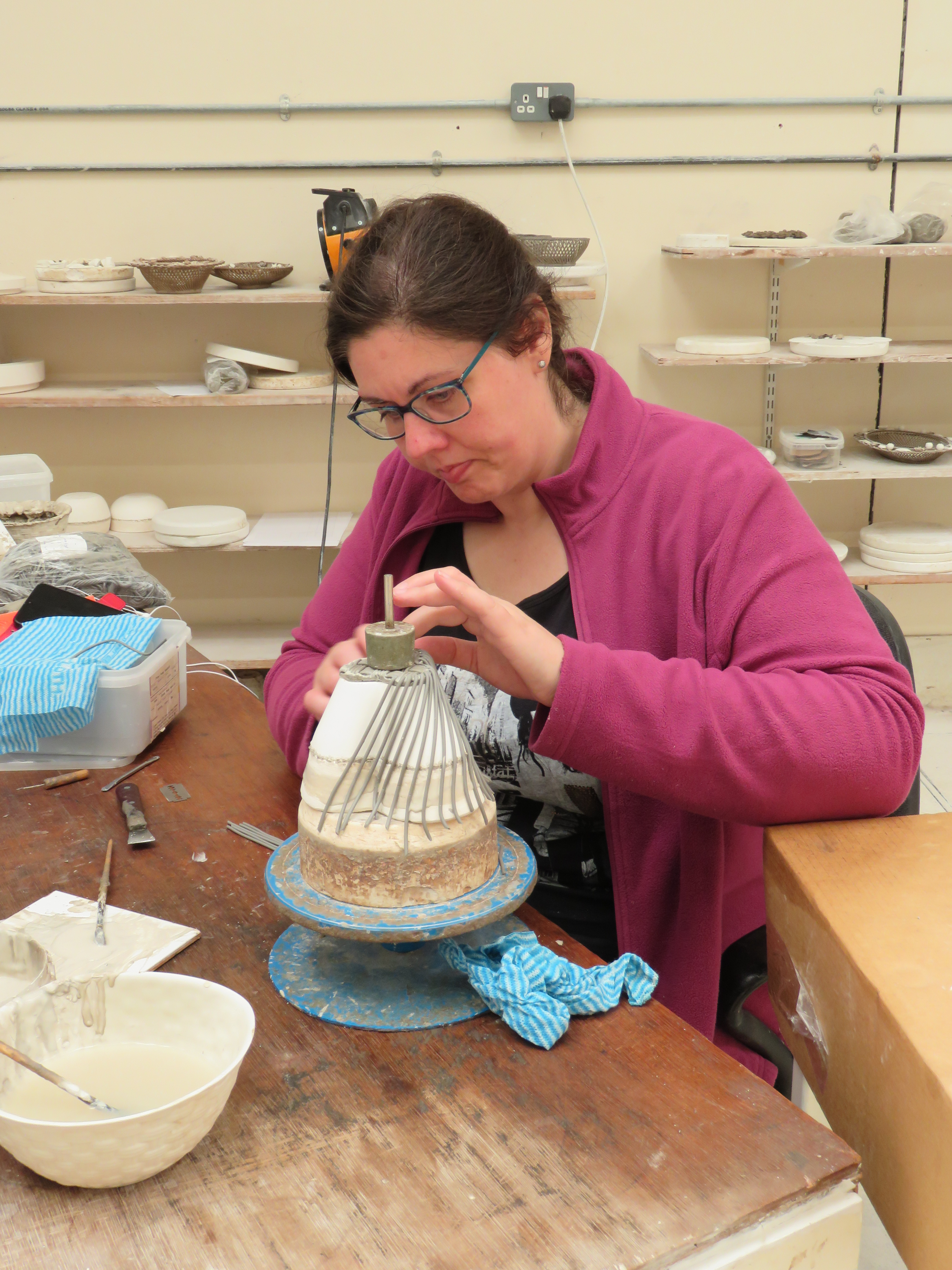
Hand building a piece of Belleek porcelain

According to their own website, annual production is more than 100,000 pieces.

== See also ==
- List of tourist attractions in Ireland
