= Copper Face Jacks =

Nightclub in Dublin

- Coppers
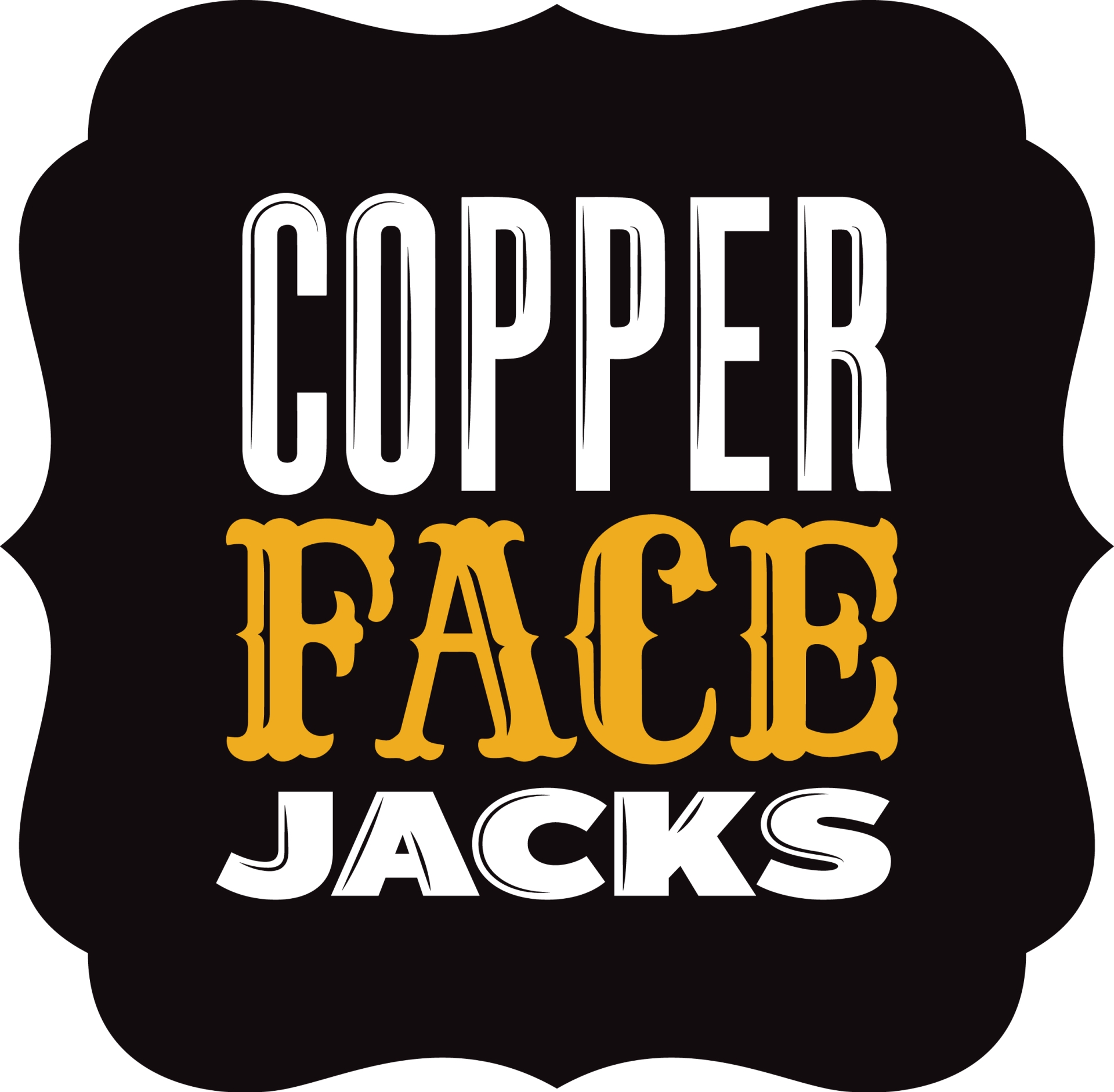

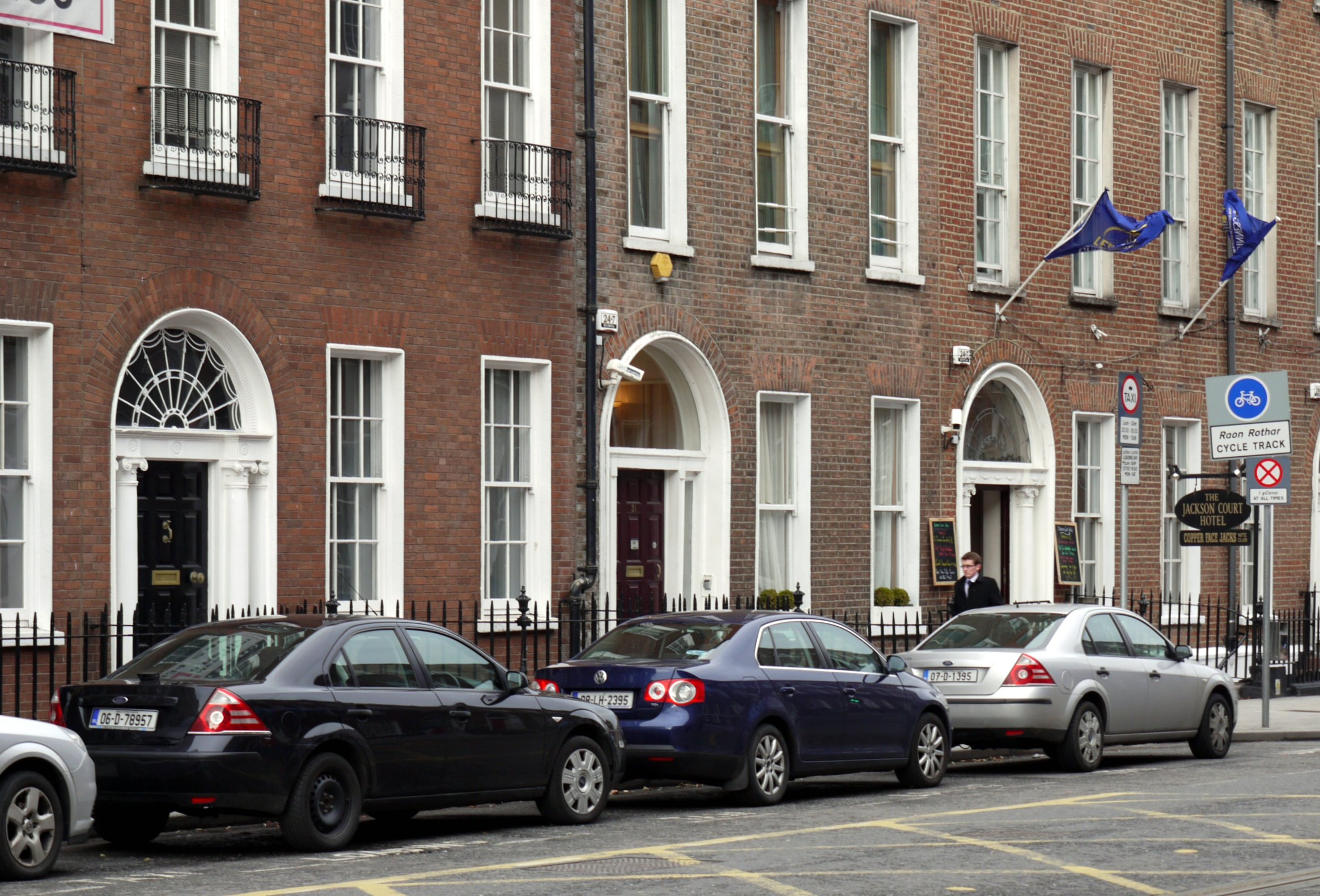
- Streetscape of Harcourt Street; Jackson Court Hotel and Copper Face Jacks visible at right

- Location within Central Dublin
- Address: 29–30 Harcourt Street; Dublin; Ireland
- Coordinates: 53.3353°N 6.2635°W
- Owner: Breanagh Catering Ltd
- Type: Nightclub
- Public transit: Harcourt

Construction
- Opened: 16 February 1996

Website
- copperfacejacks.ie

Copper Face Jacks is a nightclub in Dublin, Ireland that opened in 1996. It is located on Harcourt Street, below the 36-room Jackson Court Hotel. It is known for its popularity among people from rural Ireland working in the city, including teachers, nurses, Gardaí and Gaelic games players.

The club has six bars, two beer gardens and a VIP area, and employs 173 staff.

== History ==
Copper Face Jacks opened on 16 February 1996 and is owned by former Garda Cathal Jackson. It takes its name from John Scott, 1st Earl of Clonmell, a heavy-drinking 18th-century judge nicknamed "Copperfaced Jack" who lived on Harcourt Street.

In 2013 the club's profits were estimated at €15,000 per day. The nightclub is owned by Breanagh Catering Limited, whose only directors are Cathal Jackson, and his wife, Paula. From 2008 to 2019, these two directors earned a cumulative €8.3m each in salary. Revenues averaged between €12-13 million from 2008 to 2016, with revenues of €14million in 2016 and 2017, earnings were about €6 million.

In January 2014 seven people were injured in a crush outside the club, leading to concerns over safety.

In 2018 the club was accused of ignoring licensing laws, serving alcohol over an hour after the supposed closing time of 3:30 a.m.

The club and hotel was placed up for sale by the Jackson family in 2019, but later withdrawn from sale.

In April 2020, the business was temporarily closed due to the coronavirus pandemic.

== Cultural depictions ==
Copper Face Jacks, also commonly known as Coppers, is mentioned in Melissa Hill's novel Something You Should Know.

Ross O'Carroll Kelly visits Coppers in the 2016 novel Game of Throw-ins.

In 2018, playwright and author Paul Howard wrote Copper Face Jacks: The Musical, performed at the Olympia Theatre, Dublin.
