= Earl of Clonmell =

Earldom in the Peerage of Ireland

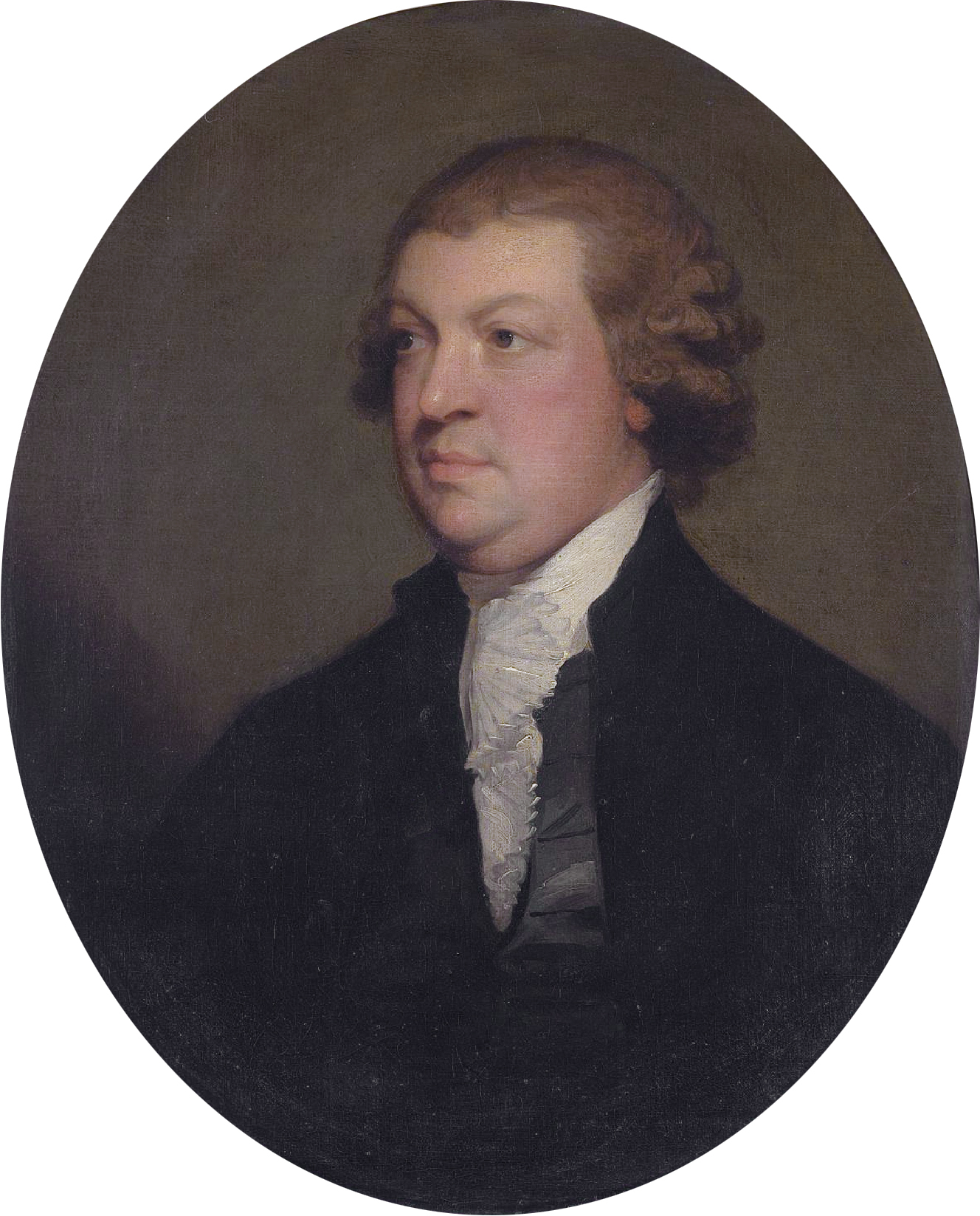
John Scott, 1st Earl of Clonmell by Gilbert Stuart(1755-1828).

Earl of Clonmell, in the County of Tipperary, was a title in the Peerage of Ireland. It was created in 1793 for John Scott, 1st Viscount Clonmell, Lord Chief Justice of the King's Bench for Ireland. He had already been created Baron Earlsfort, of Lisson-Earl in the County of Tipperary, in 1784, and Viscount Clonmell in 1789. These titles were also in the Peerage of Ireland. He was succeeded by his son, the second Earl. He sat as Member of Parliament for New Romney. His grandson, the fourth Earl, was elected an Irish representative peer in 1874.

The latter never married and was succeeded by his younger brother, the fifth Earl. He was a lieutenant-colonel in the Rifle Brigade and fought in the Ashanti War. He was childless and was succeeded by his first cousin, the sixth Earl. He was the eldest son of Colonel the Hon. Charles Grantham Scott, second son of the second Earl. On his death the titles passed to his son, the seventh Earl. Although married to music hall performer Rachel Estelle "Stella" Berridge, he died without male issue and was succeeded by his seventy-five-year-old uncle, the eighth Earl.

The latter was childless and on his death in 1935 the titles became extinct. Family homes included Bishopscourt (a.k.a. Bishop's Court) in County Kildare, Ireland (1838–1914) and Eathorpe Hall in Warwickshire, England (pre-1877 to post-1909).

== Earls of Clonmell (1793) ==
- John Henry Scott, 1st Earl of Clonmell (1739–1798)
- Thomas Scott, 2nd Earl of Clonmell (1783–1838)
- John Henry Scott, 3rd Earl of Clonmell (1817–1866)
- John Henry Reginald Scott, 4th Earl of Clonmell (1839–1891)
- Thomas Charles Scott, 5th Earl of Clonmell (1840–1896)
- Beauchamp Henry John Scott, 6th Earl of Clonmell (1847–1898)
- Rupert Charles Scott, 7th Earl of Clonmell (1877–1928)
- Dudley Alexander Charles Scott, 8th Earl of Clonmell (1853–1935)
