= Thomas Battam =

English painter

- Born: 1810; London, United Kingdom
- Died: 28 October 1864 (aged 54); Notting Hill, United Kingdom
- Occupation: Painter

Thomas Battam (1810 – 28 October 1864) was a British painter of miniatures. He was born in London. He produced copies in enamels, several of which were exhibited at the Royal Academy, London from 1833 to 1840. Battam later became art director at the Copeland porcelain factory, and was the founder, and president, of the Crystal Palace Art Union. He claimed to be the inventor of Parian Ware, an inexpensive substitute for marble. He died at Notting Hill, London, aged about fifty-four.

== Sources ==
Source: D. Foskett, A Dictionary of British Miniature Painters Vol I, London (1972)
