= Cecilia Margaret Nairn =

Irish artist

- Born: Cecilia Margaret Campbell; 1791
- Died: 4 June 1857 (aged 65–66)
- Known for: wax sculptor, painter
- Spouse: George Nairn

Cecilia Margaret Nairn née Cecilia Margaret Campbell (1791 – 4 June 1857) was an Irish wax modeller and painter. She specialised in landscape watercolour paintings and modelling flowers. Nairn's paintings were exhibited at the Royal Hibernian Academy from 1826 to 1851.

== Career ==
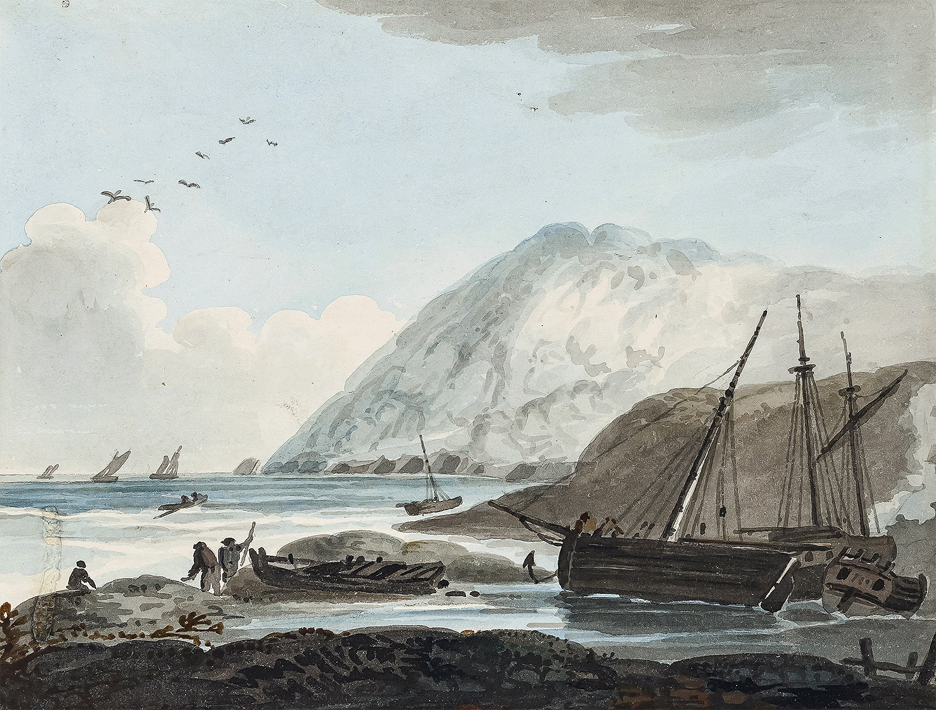
Nairn's ink and watercolour painting, Bray Head

She was a pupil of her father John Henry Campbell, himself a painter. At the age of eighteen, she began to showcase her work through various exhibits. In 1809, she sent her work to the exhibition on Hawkins Street in Dublin to be viewed; she continually contributed to this exhibit until 1821. After this time, she sporadically contributed her work to the Royal Hibernian Academy from 1826 to 1847 in the towns of Killarney and Wicklow. The Ulster Museum hold a number of her watercolours.

== Life and death ==
Nairn was born in Dublin in 1791. She had two brothers, John and Charles. John lived in Belfast and was a designer of damask and linen patterns, and Charles was an army officer. She married Irish horse painter George Nairn (1799 – 25 January 1850). Both their daughter, Anna Langley Nairn (later Armstrong), and their son, John Campbell Nairn, became artists. After George died from a long and painful illness on 25 January 1850, her death quickly followed; she died in Oak House, Battersea, on 4 June 1857 at the age of 65.
