= Harcourt Street =

Street in Dublin, Ireland

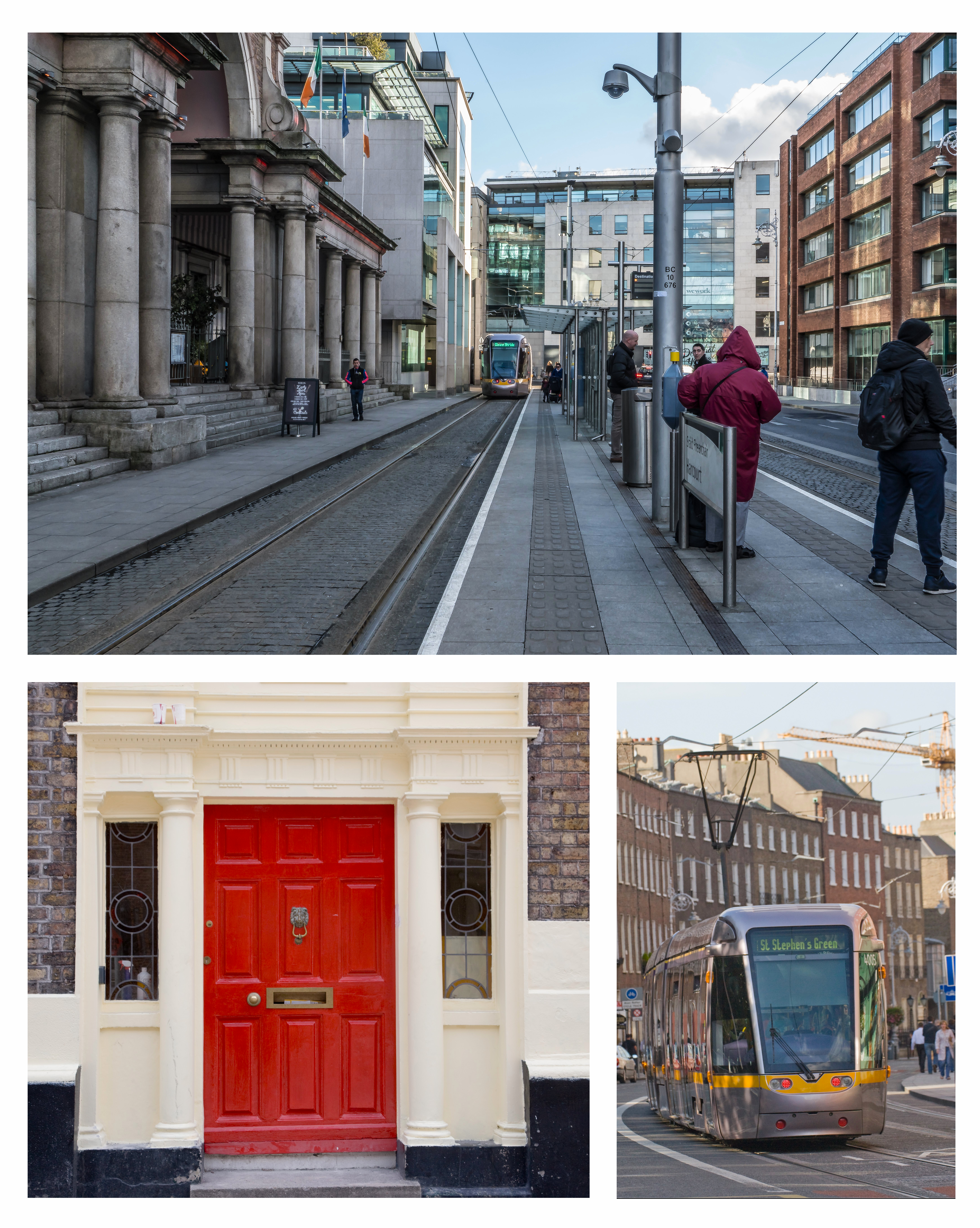
- Clockwise from top: Harcourt Street Luas stop outside the old railway station; a tram makes its way down a section of the street lined with Georgian townhouses; a doorway on Harcourt Street

- Location within Central Dublin
- Native name: Sráid Fhearchair (Irish)
- Namesake: Simon Harcourt, 1st Earl Harcourt
- Length: 600 m (2,000 ft)
- Width: 21 metres (69 ft)
- Location: Dublin, Ireland
- Postal code: D02
- Coordinates: 53.335413°N 6.263325°W
- north end: St. Stephen's Green (southwest corner), Cuffe Street
- south end: Adelaide Road, Harcourt Road

Other
- Known for: nightclubs

Harcourt Street (Irish: Sráid Fhearchair) is a street located in Dublin City, Ireland.

== Location ==
It is a little over 0.6 kilometres (0.37 mi) in length with its northerly start at the south-east corner of St Stephen's Green and terminates in the south at the point where Adelaide Road becomes Harcourt Road, near Harcourt Terrace.

The River Stein, an underground river, runs underneath the upper section of the street.

== History ==
The street was created during a period of street construction and improvement overseen by the Wide Streets Commission in the 18th century, extending from St Stephen's Green towards the Circular Road to the south. It was laid out from 1777 by John Hatch. The street first appears on maps in 1784 and is named after Simon Harcourt, 1st Earl Harcourt. By 1791, Hatch had secured enough land to develop the street to its full intended length and by 1843, it had 72 houses.

Unionist politician Edward Carson was born at no. 4 and there is a plaque located at the house. John Scott, 1st Earl of Clonmell, known as Copper-faced Jack, lived at the largest house on the street at number 17 and later referred to as Clonmell House. This house and gardens were originally intended for the developer John Hatch, but he decided to sell them onwards and build his own dedicated house and gardens, the second largest and finest house on the street at number 40. Number 40 was finally only demolished in the 1970s after being sold by The High School as its main school building and grounds. Prior to that point in the 19th century the building had been owned and used as the headquarters of the Irish Charter Schools movement.

Bram Stoker lived at no. 16 for a period.

No. 6 is a building with many historical connections including as headquarters of Arthur Griffith's Sinn Féin. It was donated by the state to Conradh na Gaeilge in 1966 on the fiftieth anniversary of the Easter Rising. This was to mark the contribution of Conradh na Gaeilge to the nationalist movement, six of the seven signatories of the 1916 Proclamation having been members of the Conradh. The building was the subject of a documentary Uimhir 6.

== Architecture ==
The street is a largely intact Georgian one. Harcourt Street station, the former railway station and namesake terminus of the Harcourt Street line, is a prominent building on the street.

As of 2018 the road is overlaid with a Luas tram line and traffic is in a single direction only outwards from the intersection with Charlotte Way. There is a Luas stop outside the old railway terminus building, towards the south end of the street, which now houses a cocktail bar, The Odeon. The street is home to several hotels, bars and nightclubs, including Tripod, Dicey's Garden and Copper Face Jacks.

== See also ==
- List of streets and squares in Dublin
