= John Henry Campbell (painter) =

English Landscape Painter

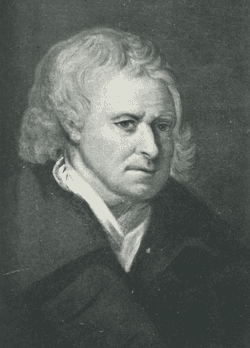
- Born: 1757; Herefordshire, England
- Died: 10 May 1828 (aged 70–71)
- Known for: painter
- Children: Cecilia Margaret Nairn

John Henry Campbell (1757 — 10 May 1828) was a landscape painter.

== Early life and family ==
John Henry Campbell was born in 1757 in Herefordshire, England. His parents were both English, and his mother's maiden name was Beaumont or Beaufort. The family left Herefordshire for Dublin, where Campbell's father entered into a business partnership with Daniel Graisberry, a printer. Circa 1800, Campbell was a resident of Paradise Row, and in 1801 was living in 13 Trinity Street. Campbell had at least 2 sons and a daughter. One son, John, lived in Belfast and designed damask and linen patterns, and the other, Charles, was an army officer killed during the storming of Badajos. His daughter, Cecilia Margaret Nairn, was also a landscape artist. Campbell died on 10 May 1828.

== Career ==
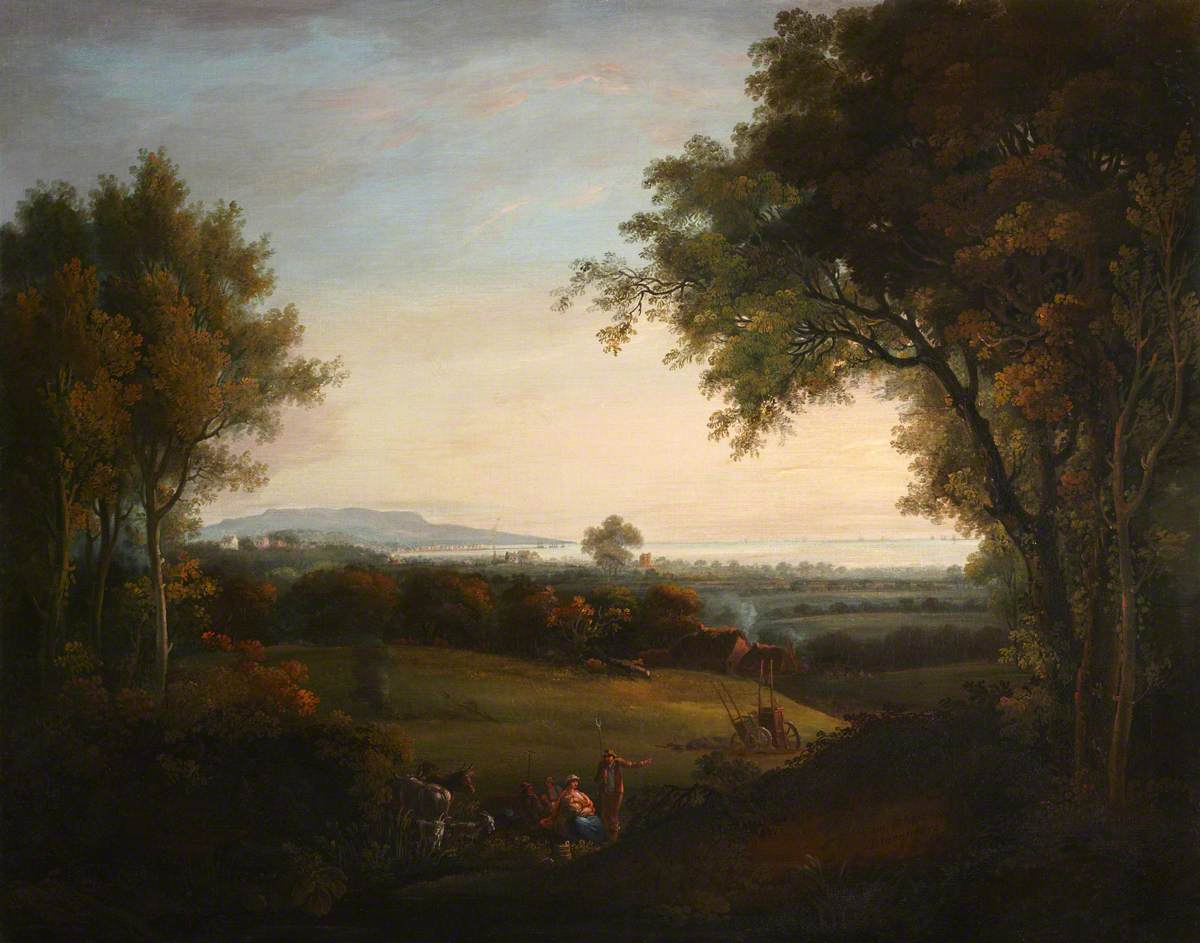
Dublin Bay from Phibsborough held by the National Trust

Campbell attended the Dublin Society School, going on to establish himself as a topographical landscape painter. He painted the surrounding countryside of Counties Dublin and Wicklow. Early in his career, Campbell also painted watercolour head-and-shoulder portraits, with an example of this period his 1786 portraits of the Caulfeild family of Benown, County Westmeath. He is known to have exhibited at Allen's, 32 Dame Street, Dublin in 1800, and in Parliament House in 1801 with two landscapes. He went onto to exhibit 2 more landscapes in 1802 and in 1804, and regularly exhibiting from 1809 to 1819. Campbell was one of the exhibitors at the Royal Hibernian Academy inaugural exhibition in 1826 with "Moonlight", going on to submit 6 landscapes in 1828. An admirer of Paul Sandby, copying his paintings. He primarily worked in watercolour, but he also executed some works in oil.

The National Gallery of Ireland hold 7 landscapes by Campbell. The British Museum hold two works by him. The Neptune Gallery staged a retrospective of Campbell's work in 1966.

== Selected works ==
- View from Dublin, Howth, etc., from Huband Bridge
- View of Dublin Bay and Harbour from Stillorgan (1812)
- Dublin Bay from Phibsborough
- View near Rostrevor
- Bridge over the Dodder, Upper Rathmines
- The Little Suger-Loaf (1806)
- Rathgar Castle (1807)
