= Parian ware =

Ceramic substitute for marble

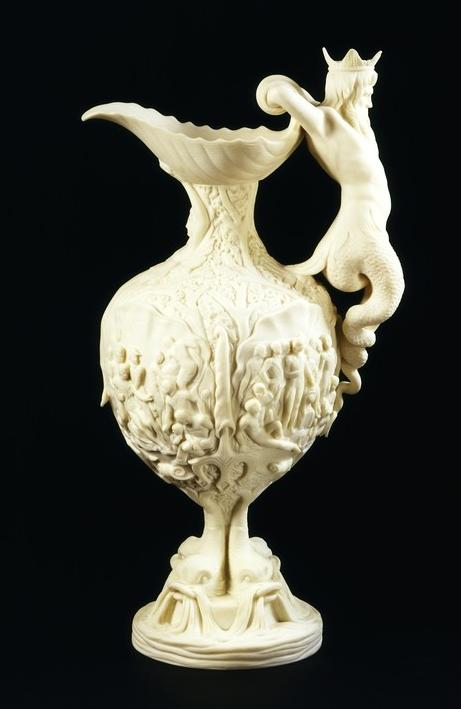
Parian "Nelson Jug" (1851)

Parian ware is a type of bisque porcelain imitating marble. It was developed around 1845 by the Staffordshire pottery manufacturer Mintons, and named after Paros, the Greek island renowned for its fine-textured, white Parian marble, used since antiquity for sculpture. It was also contemporaneously referred to as Statuary Porcelain by Copeland. Parian was essentially designed to imitate carved marble, with the great advantage that it could be prepared in a liquid form and cast in a mould, enabling mass production.

== Invention ==
The early history of the invention of Parian was confused at the time, with several firms producing biscuit, working concurrently to produce an improved material, and claiming credit. The first to claim its invention was Thomas Battam, manager of the art department at the Copeland Factory, who gave it the title 'Statuary Porcelain'. In 1842 Copeland produced some models, purchased by the Duke of Sutherland, the finish of which closely imitated some marbles in his collection. Battam's material however was thought to be a version of stoneware. The most likely date for the invention of Parian is 1845 when Minton produced trials, with versions on sale in June 1845. The judges at the Great Exhibition were undecided as to whom the first inventor was:

... the Jury find that they could not recommend an award of the Council Medal for the invention of Parian without deciding on the disputed claim of priority between the very eminent firms, who severally advanced that claim with equal confidence. We have not felt it our duty to come to any such decision; especially as it would appear from the statement of each party that, whichever may have actually been first in publicly producing articles in this material both were contemporaneously working with success towards the same result.

== Hand crafting ==
Parian could also be hand-crafted rather than the usual moulding; the production of a rose by an artisan is described in 1859, though it is not clear if this is in Minton's factory or Copeland's.

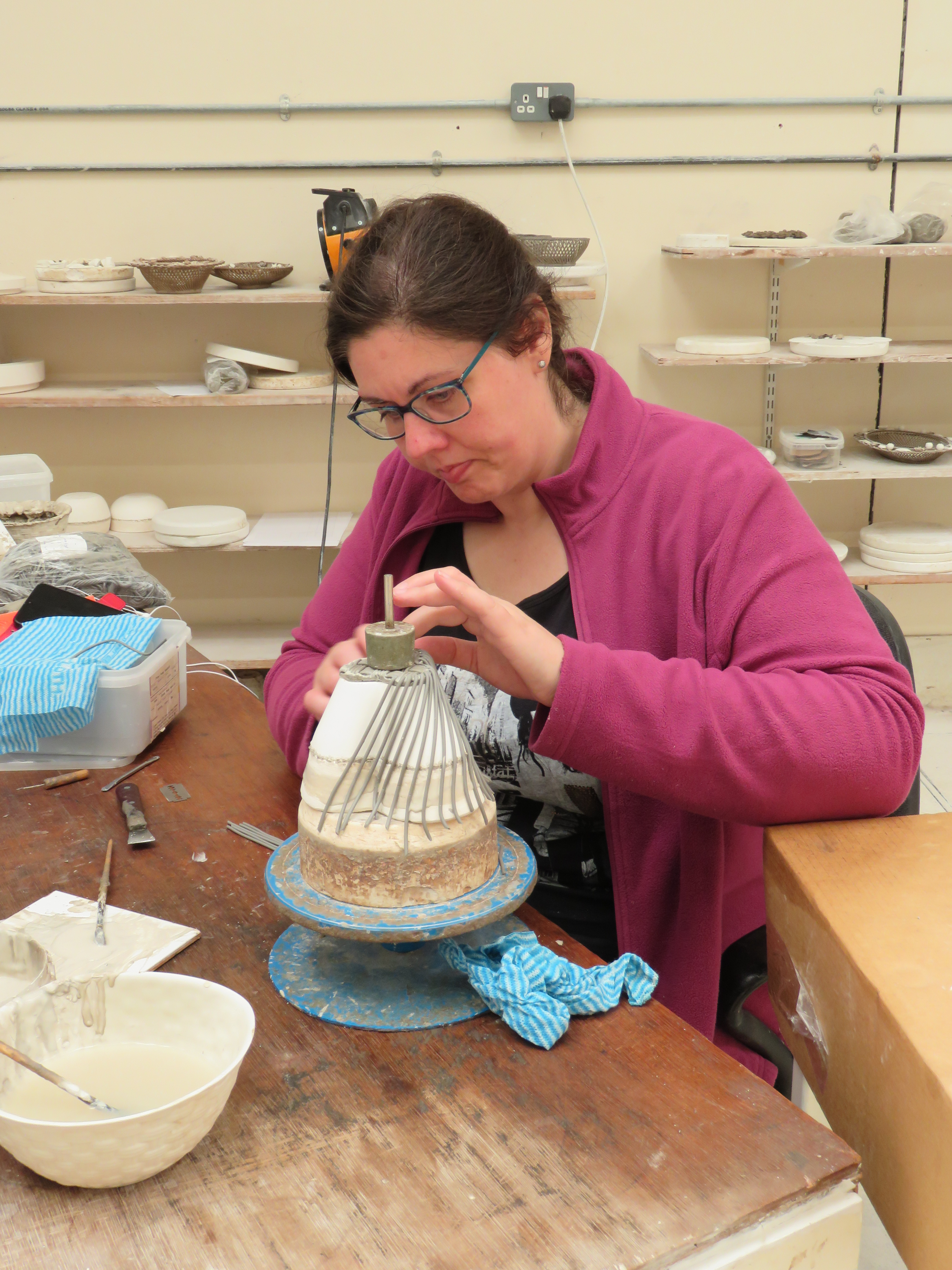
Hand building a piece of Belleek porcelain

== Composition ==
Parian has a more vitrified finish than porcelain due to the use of a significant amount of frit.

== Uses ==
Parian ware was utilised mainly for busts and figurines, and occasionally for dishes and small vases, such as might be carved from marble. In 1845, as part of a concerted effort to raise public taste and improve manufactures, the Art Union of London commissioned Copeland to make a series of figures after works by leading contemporary sculptors. Mintons and Wedgwood produced similar wares, also known as "statuary porcelain". Parian was initially used for relatively high quality work, but later was produced by a great number of manufacturers and considerably lost its cachet. Parian is still being made by Belleek Pottery in County Fermanagh, Northern Ireland.

== British Parian manufacturers ==
There were numerous British Parian manufacturers in the nineteenth century, of these two of the largest were Minton and Copeland.

- Minton
- Copeland
- Wedgwood Carrara
- Worcester Busts and Figures
- Robinson and Leadbeater Figures and Portrait Busts
- Goss
- John Adams & Co.
- William Adams & Co.
- Edwin Bennett, British American
